= List of towns in Lahore =

Based on the Punjab Village Panchayats and Neighbourhood Councils Bill 2019 (PVPaNCB 2019), published April 23, 2019, Union Councils (UCs) will be replaced by Neighbourhood Councils (NCs). While this law will result in much smaller council areas for the panchayats in rural areas and for the NCs in smaller towns and cities, the change for the City District of Lahore, Pakistan, will be limited. In first schedule of the PVPaNCB 2019 (p. 23), the maximum of permitted neighbourhoods for Lahore is fixed as 280. Since 2015, 274 Union Councils have existed in the City District of Lahore.

The names and boundaries of the new neighbourhoods will be published in the official Punjab gazette before the end of October 2019. Each neighbourhood will have 36.000 to 44.000 inhabitants based on the data of the 2017 census.

As of 2001, 152 Union Councils existed in the City District of Lahore. Based on the Punjab Local Government Act of 2013, issued before the local elections of October 31, 2015, the number of Union Councils increased to 274, as listed further below in § List of Union Councils as of 2015

== List of Union Councils as of 2015 ==
From 2015 on there have been 274 Union Councils in Lahore.

#	Town	Union Council
1	Ravi Zone	UC 1 Begum Kot Shahdara; UC 2 Yousif Park; UC 3 Kot Kamboh; UC 4 Shamsabad Shahdara; UC 5 Chah Jhabbay Wala; UC 6 Aziz Colony Shahdra; UC 7 Lajpat; UC 8 Faisal Park; UC 9 Javid Park; UC 10 Qaisar Town; UC 11 Majeed Park; UC 12 Qazi Park; UC 13 Ravi Clifton Colony; UC 14 Ladhay Shah; UC 15 Qila Lakshan Singh; UC 16 Auqaf Colony; UC 17 Farooq Ganjj; UC 18 Hanif Park; UC 19 Siddique Pura; UC 20 Larix Park; UC 21 Badar Colony; UC 22 Data Nagar; UC 23 Siddiqa Colony; UC 24 Bhagat Pura; UC 25 Jhuggian; UC 26 Akram Park; UC 27 Fazal Park; UC 28 Jahangir Park; UC 29 Usman Ganjj; UC 30 Manzorabad; UC 31 Faiz Bagh; UC 32 Mochi Gate; UC 33 Azam Market; UC 34 Shah Alam Market; UC 35 Rang Mahal; UC 36 Lohari Gate; UC 37 Bhati Gate; UC 38 Shahi Qila; UC 39 Sutar Mandi
2	Shalamar Zone	UC 40 Hussain Park; UC 41 Makhan Pura; UC 42 Dhobi Ghat; UC 43 Sultan Pura; UC 44 Misri Shah; UC 45 Chah Miran; UC 46 Kajhho Pura; UC 47 Wasan Pura; UC 121 Crown Park; UC 125 Baghban Pura; UC 126 Begumpura; UC 127 Makhdoon Bahauddin Shah; UC 128 Hazrart Madho Lal Hussain; UC 129 Muhammad Din Colony; UC 130 Madina Colony; UC 153 Angori Bagh Schame; UC 154 Kotli Pir Abdul Rehman; UC 156 Sahwari; UC 161 China Schame ( Gujarpura ); UC 162 Qamar Din Park; UC 163 Multani Colony; UC 164 Rehmat Pura; UC 165 Ghaous Park Sarfraz Colony; UC 166 Shahnawaz Park; UC 167 Bilal Park
3	Aziz Bhatti Zone	UC 139 Nishtar Colony; UC 140 Fatehgarh; UC 141 Rasheed Pura; UC 142 Nabipura; UC 145 Harbans Pura; UC 146 Panj Pir; UC 147 Razzaq Colony; UC 148 Tajpura; UC 149 Al Faisal Town; UC 150 Ranger Headquarters; UC 151 Guldast Colony; UC 152 Nawanpind Harbanspura; UC 155 Faisal Park; UC 157 Ganjj Mughalpura; UC 158 Nabi Nagar Ghaziabad; UC 159 Ghaziabad; UC 160 Nizamabad; UC 184 Daraipura Mughalpura; UC 186 Madni Mahallah Mustafabad; UC 187 Mustafaabad; UC 188 Mian Mir; UC 192 Terra; UC 193 Bhangali
4	Data Gunj Bakhsh Zone	UC 48 Razipura; UC 49 Kasur Pura; UC 50 Shafiqabad; UC 51 Amin Park; UC 52 Nasir Park; UC 53 Karim Park; UC 54 Darbar Pir Makki; UC 55 Mian Shamsuddin Park; UC 56 Mian Munshi Park; UC 57 Tauheed Park; UC 58 Sunt Nagar; UC 59 Chohan Park; UC 60 Outfall Road / Chohan Road; UC 61 Purana Anarkali; UC 62 Beadon Road; UC 63 New Anarkali; UC 64 Riwaz Garden; UC 65 Islam Pura; UC 66 Sanda; UC 67 Sadaqat Park; UC 68 Mozang; UC 69 Sir Ganga Ram Hospital; UC 70 Sarai Sultan; UC 71 Shibli Town; UC 72 Usman Ganjj; UC 73 Raj Garh; UC 74 Sanda Khurd; UC 81 G.O.R Lahore; UC 168 Gawalmandi; UC 169 Nisbat Road Gawalmandi; UC 170 Shah Abul Muaali; UC 171 Qila Gujjar Singh; UC 198 Shadman Colony; UC 199 Shah Jamal
5	Samanabad Zone	UC 75 Gulshan e Ravi; UC 76 New Chauburji Park; UC 77 Gulshan Ravi F Block; UC 78 Gulshan Ravi A Block; UC 79 Rustam Park; UC 80 Gulgasht Colony; UC 82 Islamia Park; UC 83 Bahawalpur House; UC 84 Pir Ghazi Road Ichra; UC 85 Rehman Pura; UC 86 New Samanabad; UC 87 Muhammad Pura; UC 88 Kamboh Colony; UC 89 Nawan Kot Samanabad; UC 90 Zubaida Park; UC 91 Dongi Ground Samanabad; UC 92 Union Park; UC 93 Shaheenabad / Shera Kot; UC 94 Sodiwal / Tariq Colony; UC 99 New Shalimar Colony; UC 100 Babu Sabo; UC 104 Jafria Colony; UC 107 Pakki Thatti; UC 212 Huma Block / Allama Iqbal Town; UC 213 Kashmir Block; UC 214 Raza Block; UC 215 Karim Block; UC 216 Muslim Town; UC 217 Clifton Colony Shah Kamal; UC 218 Jahanzaib Block; UC 219 Neelum Block
6	Gulberg Zone	UC 118 Signal Shop; UC 119 Railway Colony; UC 120 Dars Chotay Mian; UC 122 Dars Barray Mian; UC 123 Garhi Shahu Lahore; UC 124 Barganza Quarters; UC 172 Bibi Pak Daman; UC 173 Habibullah Road; UC 185 Basti Saidan Shah; UC 200 Canal Park; UC 201 Ghous Azan Colony Gulberg 2; UC 202 Gulberg III lahore; UC 203 FC College / Kachi Aabadu; UC 204 Model Colony Gulberg; UC 205 Makkah Colony; UC 206 Gopal Nagar; UC 207 Model Town Lahore; UC 208 New Garden Town; UC 209 Model Town Extension; UC 210 Faisal Town; UC 211 Kotha Pind / Faisal Town; UC 223 Q Block Model Town; UC 224 Pindi Rajpotan; UC 225 Liaqatabad Kot Lakhpat; UC 226 Model Town R Block Bahar Colony
7	Wahga Zone	UC 108 Karwalwar; UC 131 Naseerabad; UC 132 Mehmood Boti; UC 133 Green Park; UC 134 Muslimabad; UC 135 Siraj Pura; UC 136 Darogha Wala; UC 137 Shahdi Pura; UC 138 Mominpura; UC 143 Salamat Pura; UC 144 Warra Sattar; UC 174 Lakho Dair; UC 175 Banda Gujjran; UC 176 Awan Dhainwala; UC 177 Attokay Awan; UC 178 Manawan Rampur Jageer; UC 179 Bhasmain; UC 180 Manhala; UC 181 Wagah; UC 182 Dograiy Kallan; UC 183 Muza Jallo Khera; UC 189 Barki; UC 190 Badyara; UC 191 Ghond; UC 194 Ludhar
8	Allama Iqbal Zone	UC 95 Dholan Wal; UC 96 Sabzazar Block B; UC 97 Syedpur; UC 98 Sabza Zar; UC 101 Kot Kamboh Khurd; UC 102 Jhugian Nagra; UC 103 Sabzazar K Block; UC 105 Hassan Town / Awan Town; UC 106 Mustafa Park; UC 109 Margzar Colony; UC 110 Thokar Niaz Baig; UC 111 Hanjarwal; UC 112 Mustafa Town; UC 113 Ayaz Baig Kanal View; UC 114 Johar Town; UC 115 Johar Town / PIA Society; UC 116 EME Society; UC 117 Shahpur Kanjraan; UC 220 Wafaqi Colony; UC 221 E Block Johar Town; UC 222 Jodhapur; UC 232 Township Sector B-1; UC 233 Sector 2 Township; UC 234 Sector 1 Township; UC 255 Sattao Katlah; UC 256 Ali Razaabad; UC 257 Wapda Town; UC 258 Chuhang Panj Garian; UC 259 Izmir Town/Colony; UC 260 Marakah; UC 261 Mohalowal; UC 262 Shamkay Bhattian; UC 263 Manga; UC 264 Sultankay; UC 265 Manga Lotar; UC 266 Tallab Saraiy; UC 267 Mank; UC 268 Jodhu Dhair; UC 272 Raiwind Rural; UC 273 Raiwind Urban; UC 274 Bablian Otar
9	Nishtar Zone	UC 195 Hear; UC 196 Jalman; UC 197 Dhalway; UC 227 Bostan Colony; UC 228 Chungi Amar Sadhu; UC 229 Qauid e Millat Colony; UC 230 Sittara Colony; UC 231 Pak Colony; UC 235 Township Sector B-2; UC 236 Sector 11 Green Town C; UC 237 Sector 11 D Green Town; UC 238 Marryum Colony; UC 239 Kair Killan Green Town; UC 240 Bagrian Dharam Chand; UC 241 Chandraiy Karim Park; UC 242 Attari Saroba; UC 243 Nishtar Colony; UC 244 Gajju Mattah; UC 245 Dillo Kallan; UC 246 Yuhanabad; UC 247 Kahana Kohana; UC 248 Shazwah; UC 249 Kamahan; UC 250 Thapanjo; UC 251 Baloki; UC 252 Pandoki; UC 253 Saraich; UC 254 Viewkhurd Kallan; UC 269 Bhoptian; UC 270 Araiyan; UC 271 Jia Bagga

== List of Union Councils 2001-2015 ==
Under the 2001 revision of Pakistan's administrative structure Lahore was tagged as a City District, and divided into nine towns. Each town in turn consists of a group of Union Councils. All in all 152 Union Councils existed in the City District of Lahore, including the Cantonment area.

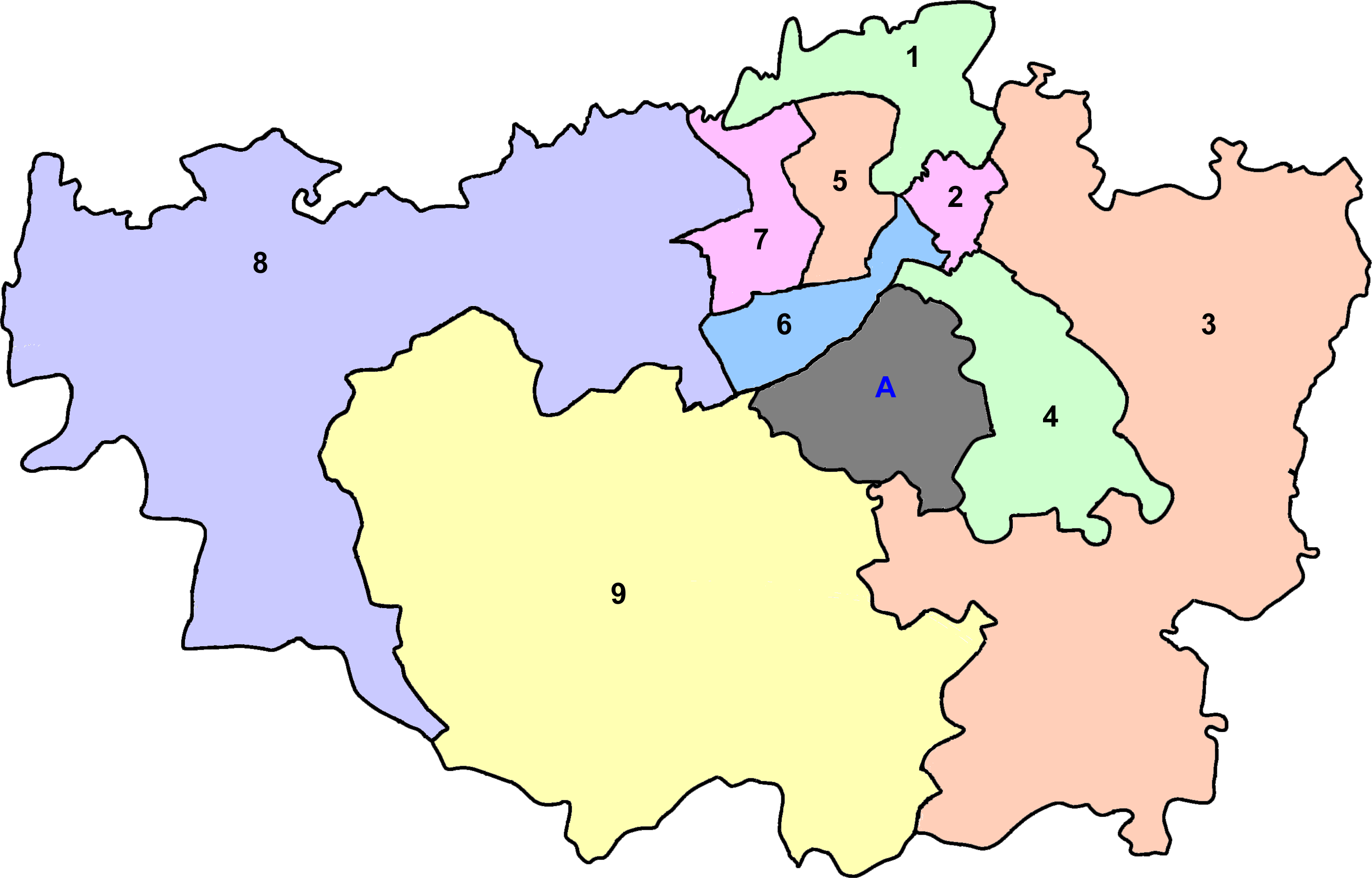
Administrative towns of Lahore

#	Town	Union Council
1	Ravi	Begum Kot (UC 1); Kot Mohibbu (UC 2); Azizabad (UC 3); Faisal Bagh (UC 4); Qaiser (UC 5); Dhair (UC 6); Shahdara Bagh (UC 7); Jia Musa (UC 8); Qila Lachhman Singh (UC 9); Palmandi (UC 10); Siddiquepura (UC 11); Bangali Bagh (UC 12); Siddiqia (UC 13); Bhamman (UC 14)
2	Shalamar	Bhaghatpura (UC 15); Gujjarpura (UC 16); Rehmatpura (UC 17); Begampura (UC 18); Chah Miran (UC 19); Bilal Bagh (UC 20); Makhanpura (UC 21); Kot Khawaja Saeed (UC 22); Shad Bagh (UC 23); Wassanpura (UC 24); Faiz Bagh (UC 25); Farooqganj (UC 26); Crown Park (UC 33); Madhu Lal Hussain (UC 34); Muhammad (UC 35); Baghbanpura (UC 36); Angori Bagh (UC 46); Mujahidabad (UC 47)
3	Wagha	Daroghawala (UC 42); Muhammad (UC 37); Sultan Mehmood (UC 38); Dograi Kalan (UC 51); Muslimabad (UC 39); Salamatpura (UC 40); Lakhodher (UC 49); Bhaseen (UC 50: Batapur); Manhala (UC 53); Barki (UC 62); Hadiara (UC 65: Ghurki)
4	Aziz Bhatti	Harbanspura (UC 41); Rashidpura (UC 43); Fatehgarh (UC 44); Nabipura (UC 45); Mughalpura (UC 48); Mian Meer (UC 54); Mustafabad (UC 55); Ghaziabad (UC 56); Tajbagh (UC 57); Tajpura (UC 58); Al Faisal (UC 59); Guldasht (UC 60); Bhangali (UC 61)
5	Data Gunj Buksh	Kasur Pura (UC 67); Amin Park (UC 68); Karim Park (UC 69); Ganj Kalan (UC 70); Bilal Ganj (UC 71); Anarkali (UC 72); Gawalmandi (UC 73); Sare Sultan (UC 74); Qila Gujar Singh (UC 77); Race Course Park (UC 78); Mozang (UC 79); Jinnah Hall (UC 80: Islampura, Krishan Nagar); Rizwan Bagh (UC 81); Islam Pura (UC 82); Chohan Bagh (UC 83); Sanda (UC 85); Sanda Khurd (UC 86); Shadman (UC 94)
6	Gulberg	Railway Colony (UC 31); Daras Barey Mian (UC 32); Bibi Pak Daman (UC 75); Garhi Shahu (UC 76); Al Hamra (UC 95); Zaman Park (UC 96: Mayo Gardens); Gulberg (UC 97); Makkah (UC 98); Naseerabad (UC 99); Garden Town (UC 126); Model Town (UC 127); Faisal Town (UC 128: Mochi Pura); Liaqatabad (UC 129); Kot Lakhpat (UC 130); Pindi Rajputan (UC 131)
7	Samanabad	Abu Bakar Siddique (UC 84); Shamnagar (UC 87); Gulgasht (UC 88); Gulshan-e-Ravi (UC 89); Babu Sabu (UC 90); Rizwan Park (UC 91); Sodiwal (UC 92); Bahawalpur (UC 93: Islamia Park); Ichhra (UC 100); Naya Samanabad (UC 101); Shah Jamal (UC 102); Pakki Thatti (UC 103); Kashmir (UC 104); Nawan Kot (UC 105); Samanabad (UC 106); Rehmanpura (UC 107); Gulshan-e-Iqbal (UC 108); Sikandar (UC 109: Mustafa Town); Muslim Town (UC 115)
8	Iqbal	Awan Town (UC 110: Hassan Town); Saidpur (UC 111); Sabzazar (UC 112); Canal (UC 113); Bakar Mandi (UC 114); Johar Town (UC 116); Hanjarwal (UC 117: Mansoorah, Education Town); Niaz Beg (UC 118); Shahpur (UC 119); Ali Raza Abad (UC 120: ACHS, Wapda); Chung (UC 121); Maraka; Shamke Bhattian (UC 123); Sultanke (UC 124: Jati Umra); Manga (UC 125); Township (UC 132, UC 133); Paji (UC 148); Dholanwal (UC 149: Raiwind)
9	Nishtar	Kamahan (UC 63); Hair (UC 64); Dhaloke (UC 66); Bostan (UC 134); Ismailnagar (UC 135); Sitara (UC 136); Farid (UC 137); Keer Kalan (UC 138); Green Town (UC 139); Maryam (UC 140); Attari Saroba (UC 141); Dullo Khurd Kalan (UC 142); Chandrai (UC 143); Haloke (UC 144: Valencia, NFCHS); Gajju Matta (UC 145); Kahna Nau (UC 146); Jia Bagga (UC 147); Pandoke (UC 150: Ladheke)
A	Cantonment*	Lahore Cantonment (UC 152: Defence, Cavalry Ground, Islamnagar)

*Independent municipality under Lahore Cantonment Board.
