= Garden Town, Lahore =

Garden Town گارڈن ٹاؤن
- Neighbourhood
- Country: Pakistan
- Province: Punjab
- City: Lahore
- Tehsil: Model Town
- Established in 1958

Garden Town (Punjabi, Urdu: گارڈن ٹاؤن) is a residential neighbourhood in Model Town Tehsil of Lahore in Punjab, Pakistan.

== History ==
Garden Town was acquired in 1958 by the Lahore Development Authority, which at that time was called the Lahore Improvement Trust. Prior to that, the majority of the land was being used for agriculture. Due to its close proximity to Canal Road, it was a popular place to settle among businessmen. During the 1970s, urban development increased significantly, when Punjab University opened its new campus along Garden Town's northern boundary. Development of the residential neighbourhood continued up until the 1980s and by the 1990s, most of the plots had been developed.

== Location ==
Garden Town is located in Model Town Tehsil.

The borders surrounding Garden Town are:

- North – Canal Bank Road, Punjab University, Main Campus
- South – Model Town
- East – Gulberg
- West – Faisal Town

== Blocks ==
Garden Town is divided into 12 blocks:

- Garden Block – plots measuring 836 m^{2} (9,000 sq ft), 1,672 m^{2} (18,000 sq ft) and 3,344 m^{2} (35,990 sq ft)
- Ahmed Block – plots measuring 4,180 m^{2} (45,000 sq ft) facing the canal
- Abu Bakr Block – plots measuring 4,180 m^{2} (45,000 sq ft)
- Ali Block – plots measuring 146 and 209 square yards as well as 3344 square metre plots located on Abul Hassan Isfahani Road.
- Usman Block – plots measuring 418, 836 and 1672 square metres
- Jevan Hana/Abadi Devasabad – located between Usman, Ali, Garden and Ahmed Blocks is an area called Abadi Devasabad and plots neighboring this settlement have lower value
- Tipu Block – originally had plot sizes measuring 836, 1672 and 3344 m^{2}, but after subdivisions due to inheritance, etc., over the years, mainly 418 square metres
- Babar Block – originally had plot sizes measuring 836 m^{2} (9,000 sq ft),1,672 m^{2} (18,000 sq ft) and 3,344 m^{2} (35,990 sq ft), but after subdivisions for the above-stated reason, 418 m^{2} (4,500 sq ft) square yard plots were only available
- Aibak Block – plots measuring 418 m^{2} (4,500 sq ft) to 1,672 m^{2} (18,000 sq ft)
- Aurangzeb Block – plots measuring 418 m^{2} (4,500 sq ft) and 836 m^{2} (9,000 sq ft)
- Tariq Block – plots measuring 418 m^{2} (4,500 sq ft) and 836 m^{2} (9,000 sq ft)
- Ata Turk Block – plots measuring 104 m^{2} (1,120 sq ft)to 836 m^{2} (9,000 sq ft)
- Sher Shah Block – plots measuring 104 m^{2} (1,120 sq ft) to 836 m^{2} (9,000 sq ft)

== Residents ==
Garden Town has a population of 250,000 people, and is among the most popular neighbourhoods in Lahore due to its prime location. The majority of its residents belong to the upper middle class, including businessmen. It has many hostels for students who attend the various colleges and universities in the area, including Punjab University. It is also home to some celebrities, politicians and overseas Pakistanis. The community in recent years has developed a vibrant social life and a literate elite. Property value has increased significantly due to the location of the neighbourhood and the development of Barkat Market. A typical residential home in the area can cost anywhere from U.S. $100,000 to $450,000.

== Education ==
- Primary
  - Al Marooj Comprehensive Boys School
  - Beaconhouse Boys Public School
  - Bridges Preschool
  - Cadet College Lahore
  - Scholar Inn Cadet School
  - Silk The Laureate School
- Secondary
  - Allied Boys High School
  - Dar-e-Arqam Girls High School
  - Gosha-e-Atfal Girls High School
  - Government F.D Model High School (Garden Town)
  - Government Girls High School (Barkat Market)
  - Himayat-e-Islam Girls College
  - Unique High School
- Post-Secondary
  - Grace College of Business Studies
  - SKANS School of Accountancy

== Banks ==
- JS Bank
- MCB
- Faysal Bank
- UBL
- Meezan Bank
- HBL

== Hospitals ==
- Hameed Latif Hospital
- Rasheed Hospital
- Zainab Memorial
- Masood Hospital
- Lahore Medical City hospital

== Barkat Market ==
In 2005, Barkat Market underwent massive redevelopment. Changes included increased parking space, widening of the footpath as well as reconstruction of all the roads in the market area. There are many shopping malls, restaurants and cafes in the area as well the famous Mughal-e-Azam wedding hall.

== Transportation ==
Commercialisation in this area has immensely increased the traffic flow, not only on the main roads but also on the small lanes and access roads which are unable to cope with the large volume. This has been primarily due to the mushroom growth of small institutes, ranging from tuition academies to schools, offices and colleges operating here. Commuting to different parts of the city is easy due to adequate public transport. Garden Town is among the regions to be served by the Lahore Metro.

== See also ==
- Model Town, Lahore
