= Karachi United School Championship =

- Organiser(s): Karachi United
- Founded: 2005; 21 years ago
- Region: Pakistan
- Website: karachiunited.com/events/
- 2026–27 Karachi United School Championship

The Karachi United School Championship (KUSC) is the highest level of school and college football in Karachi, Pakistan. As of 2024, there are 4 categories of the tournament namely, senior boys, senior girls, junior boys, and junior girls. This tournament features multiple school/colleges that participate in one of more categories to compete against each other.

The competition begins with a round robin league phase to qualify for the knockout rounds. It is the most watched and prestigious school and college competition in Karachi, which is played by the top schools and colleges.

Introduced in 2005, it was a way to promote football for students in their O and A Levels. The competition took inspiration from the college football held in the United States and Canada. The competition aims to find new talent for the Karachi United professional teams as well as raise the standard of football in the country.

== History ==
With the objective of providing a forum for students to play competitively in a safe and professional environment, Karachi United provided a platform for students to showcase their skills and talent in a bid nurture and harness football talent at the school/college level. It has since become the premier school/college competition with inter school and inter college rivalries developing over the years and bragging rights to fight for during the tournament.

The inaugural KUSC was held in 2005 with the senior boys category being held. Over the years, the tournament has grown in number of teams and categories. To promote football among girls and the younger students, the introduction of the girls category, senior and junior, and the junior boys category were introduced. The 2014–15 season saw the introduction of the senior girls category whereas the junior boys category and the junior girls category was introduced in the 2018–19 season and in the 2023–24 season respectively. The 2025-26 season saw the expansion of the competition to Lahore.

Karachi Grammar School is the most successful school, with a total of 14 titles, in the senior boys (6), senior girls (6), and junior girls (2) category. Foundation Public School and Bay View Academy is the most successful school in the junior boys (2) category.

Karachi United School Championship Format
Category	Playing Format	Playing Pitch	Age Group
Senior Boys	11v11	Full Field	Under 19
Senior Girls	6v6	Turf	Under 19
Junior Boys	6v6	Turf	Under 14
Junior Girls	6v6	Turf	Under 14

== Senior Boys - Karachi ==
Karachi United School Championship - Senior Boys Karachi
- Organiser(s): Karachi United
- Founded: 2005; 21 years ago
- Region: Karachi, Pakistan
- Teams: 32
- Current champions: Credo College (1st title)
- Most championships: Karachi Grammar School Nixor College (6 titles)
- Website: karachiunited.com/articles/
- 2026–27 Karachi United School Championship

Winners Karachi United School Championship
Season	Winners
Karachi United School Championship
2005	Karachi Grammar School (1)
2006–07	Karachi Grammar School (2)
2007–08	Karachi Grammar School (3)
2008–09	Karachi Grammar School (4)
2009–10	The Lyceum School (1)
2010–11	Karachi Grammar School (5)
2011–12	Nixor College (1)
2012–13	The City School, PAF Chapter (1)
2013–14	Karachi Grammar School (6)
2014–15	Nixor College (2)
2015–16	The Lyceum School (2)
2016–17	Nixor College (3)
2017–18	Nixor College (4)
2018–19	Cedar College (Pakistan) (1)
2019–20	Nixor College (5)
2020–21	Alpha College (1)
2021–22	Cedar College (Pakistan) (2)
2022–23	Sceptre College (1)
2023–24	Cedar College (Pakistan), DHA (3)
2024–25	Nixor College (6)
2025–26	Credo College (1)

The senior boys category was launched in 2005 with the aim of promoting football at a higher level of competition and encouraging schools and colleges to invest in their football programs. By introducing this category, the initiative sought to provide a structured platform for older students to develop their football skills, engage in competitive matches, and foster a deeper passion for the sport. The introduction of the senior boys category also aimed to create more opportunities for young male athletes to showcase their talent, while simultaneously motivating educational institutions to enhance their football programs, infrastructure, and coaching support. This category played a pivotal role in raising the overall standard of football at the school and college levels, contributing to the long-term growth of the sport in the region. It is the longest running category with the 2024–25 season becoming its 20th season.

Karachi Grammar School (KGS) were the successful team where they won 4 back-to-back championships, the only team to achieve this feat. Their dominance was broken by The Lyceum School when they defeated KGS in the final of the 2009–10 season. KGS then won their 5th title the following season against Southshore School. Nixor College won their first title by defeating KGS in the final of the 2011–12 season. The City School PAF Chapter won the championship the next season before KGS captured their 6th title in the 2013–14 season.

Nixor College won 3 of the next 4 championships, with The Lyceum School winning their 2nd title in the 2015–16 season. Cedar College broke the dominance by Nixor College by winning their first title in the 2018–19 season before Nixor won their 5th title the following season.

Alpha College secured their first title in the 2020–21 season before Cedar College won their 2nd the 2021–22 season. Sceptre College won their first title the following season before Cedar College DHA won the title, their first and a third for Cedar College after the campuses started competing separately, against KGS who were in their first final in 10 years.

At the 20th edition of the KUSC, Nixor College won the title for a record equaling 6th time after overcoming Sceptre College in the final despite being a man down and a goal down as they overcame the deficit in extra time.

At the 21st edition, Credo College, who were considered the dark horses overcame the odds knocking out big names en-route to their inaugural title.

=== Performances ===
Performances in the Karachi United School Championship Senior Boys Karachi by school/college
School/College	Title(s)	Seasons won
Karachi Grammar School	6	2005, 2007, 2008, 2009, 2011, 2014
Nixor College	6	2012, 2015, 2017, 2018, 2020, 2025
Cedar College (Pakistan)^{1}	3	2019, 2022, 2024
The Lyceum School	2	2010, 2016
The City School, PAF Chapter	1	2013
Alpha College	1	2021
Sceptre College	1	2023
Credo College	1	2026

^{1} includes results representing as single and separate campuses, DHA and PECHS

== Senior Girls ==
Karachi United School Championship - Senior Girls
- Organiser(s): Karachi United
- Founded: 2014; 12 years ago
- Region: Karachi, Pakistan
- Teams: 16
- Current champions: Karachi Grammar School (6th title)
- Most championships: Karachi Grammar School (6 titles)
- Website: karachiunited.com/articles/
- 2026–27 Karachi United School Championship

Winners Karachi United School Championship
Season	Winners
Karachi United School Championship
2015–16	Karachi Grammar School (1)
2016–17	Karachi Grammar School (2)
2017–18	SMB Fatima Jinnah (1)
2018–19	Aga Khan, Kharadar (1)
2019–20	Aga Khan, Higher Secondary School (5)
2020–21	Generation's School (1)
2021–22	Aga Khan, Kharadar (2)
2022–23	Karachi Grammar School (3)
2023–24	Karachi Grammar School (4)
2024–25	Karachi Grammar School (5)
2025–26	Karachi Grammar School (6)

The senior girls category was introduced in the 2014–15 season with the primary goal of creating a platform that would allow young women to develop and grow in football. This initiative aimed to break barriers and provide equal opportunities for girls to participate in organized, competitive football. By offering this category, Karachi United hoped to foster the growth of female athletes, helping them enhance their skills, gain exposure, and build confidence on the field. It was a crucial step toward promoting gender equality in sports, empowering girls to pursue football as a passion or career, and contributing to the overall development of women's football in the region.

KGS won the first 2 back-to-back titles. SMB Fatima Jinnah, the only government school in the tournament emerged victorious against all odds to secure their first title in the 2017–18 season. The Aga Khan schools won 3 of the next 4 championships, albeit with different campuses with Generations securing their first title in the 2020–21 season. KGS then won back to back titles once again after 5 years to become the most successful school in the senior girls category.

At the 20th edition of the KUSC, KGS once again won the title for the 3rd time in a row and extended their titles to five.

At the 21st edition, KGS extended the number of their titles, as they defended their title in spectacular fashion, thus becoming the 4-time back-to-back champions and their 6th title overall.

=== Performances ===
Performances in the Karachi United School Championship - Senior Girls by school/college
School/College	Title(s)	Seasons won
Karachi Grammar School	6	2016, 2017, 2023, 2024, 2025, 2026
Aga Khan, Kharadar	2	2019, 2022
SMB Fatima Jinnah	1	2018
Aga Khan, Higher Secondary School	1	2020
Generations	1	2021

== Junior Boys ==
Karachi United School Championship - Junior Boys
- Organiser(s): Karachi United
- Founded: 2019; 7 years ago
- Region: Karachi, Pakistan
- Teams: 16
- Current champions: Bay View Academy (2nd title)
- Most championships: Foundation Public School Bay View Academy (2 titles)
- Website: karachiunited.com/articles/
- 2026–27 Karachi United School Championship

Winners Karachi United School Championship
2019–20	Foundation Public School (1)
2020–21	Aga Khan, Garden (1)
2021–22	Alpha School (1)
2022–23	Foundation Public School (2)
2023–24	Bay View Academy (1)
2024–25	Happy Palace Grammar School (1)
2025–26	Bay View Academy (2)

The junior boys category was introduced in the 2019–20 season as part of a strategic effort to promote football among younger students and nurture their love for the sport from an early age. By creating this new age group, the initiative aimed to provide a structured platform for young boys to develop their football skills, engage in healthy competition, and build teamwork and sportsmanship. This category allows schools to introduce football at a grassroots level, encouraging participation, physical activity, and the overall growth of youth football.

Foundation Public School (FPS) were the champions in the inaugural season. Aga Khan, Garden and Alpha School won the championship in the 2020–21 and the 2021–22 season respectively, before FPS won it again in the 2022–23 season extending their titles to two. Bay View Academy emerged victorious in the 2023–24 season for their first title.

At the 20th edition of the KUSC, HPGS won their first title after defeating Kiran Foundation 4–0 in a one sided match.

At the 21st edition, Bay View Academy won the title on penalties defeating the defensing champions HPGS.

=== Performances ===
Performances in the Karachi United School Championship - Junior Boys by school/college
School/College	Title(s)	Seasons won
Foundation Public School	2	2020, 2023
Bay View Academy	2	2024, 2026
Aga Khan, Garden	1	2021
Alpha School	1	2022
Happy Palace Grammar School	1	2025

== Junior Girls ==
Karachi United School Championship - Junior Girls
- Organiser(s): Karachi United
- Founded: 2023; 3 years ago
- Region: Karachi, Pakistan
- Teams: 8
- Current champions: Karachi Grammar School (3rd title)
- Most championships: Karachi Grammar School (3 titles)
- Website: karachiunited.com/articles/
- 2026–27 Karachi United School Championship

Winners Karachi United School Championship
2023–24	Karachi Grammar School (1)
2024–25	Karachi Grammar School (2)
2025–26	Karachi Grammar School (3)

To encourage the growth and participation of young girls in football, the junior girls category was introduced in the 2023–24 season as part of a larger initiative to develop the sport at a grassroots level. This new category provided a platform for younger female players to engage in competitive football, fostering their skills, confidence, and passion for the game from an early age. The introduction of this category marks a significant step in promoting gender equality in sports and empowering girls through football.

KGS were crowned champions of the inaugural season. At the 20th edition of the KUSC, KGS won the title to become the 2-time defending champions. At the 21st edition, KGS defended their title to become the 3-time defending champions.

=== Performances ===
Performances in the Karachi United School Championship - Junior Girls by school/college
School/College	Title(s)	Seasons won
Karachi Grammar School	3	2024, 2025, 2026

== Senior Boys - Lahore ==
Karachi United School Championship - Senior Boys Lahore
- Organiser(s): Karachi United
- Founded: 2025; 1 year ago
- Region: Karachi, Pakistan
- Teams: 8
- Current champions: Lahore Grammar School, Paragon (1st title)
- Most championships: Lahore Grammar School, Paragon (1 title)
- Website: karachiunited.com/events/
- 2026–27 Karachi United School Championship

Winners Karachi United School Championship
2025–26	Lahore Grammar School Paragon (1)

In order to expand the competition to a national level, KUSC expanded into Lahore. With 8 teams competing in the 2025-26 edition, LGS Paragon were crowned champions after overcoming APS Garrison in the final.

=== Performances ===
Performances in the Karachi United School Championship - Senior Boys Lahore by school/college
School/College	Title(s)	Seasons won
Lahore Grammar School, Paragon	1	2026

== KUSC Super Cup ==
Karachi United School Championship - Super Cup
- Organiser(s): Karachi United
- Founded: 2025; 1 year ago
- Region: Karachi, Pakistan
- Teams: 2
- Current champions: Lahore Grammar School, Paragon (1st title)
- Most championships: Lahore Grammar School, Paragon (1 title)
- Website: karachiunited.com/articles/
- 2026–27 Karachi United School Championship

Winners Karachi United School Championship
2025–26	Lahore Grammar School Paragon (1)

In order to foster competition between cities, KUSC hosted the Super Cup where the winners of the respective cities competed against each other. With both the winners from the two cities, Credo College (Karachi) and LGS Paragon (Lahore), LGS Paragon were crowned champions after overcoming Credo college in the penalty shootout of the final.

=== Performances ===
Performances in the Karachi United School Championship - Senior Boys Lahore by school/college
School/College	Title(s)	Seasons won
Lahore Grammar School, Paragon	1	2026

== See also ==
- Karachi United
- Karachi United WFC
