= Mochi Pura =

Mochi Pura موچی پورہ
- Locality
- Country: Pakistan
- Province: Punjab
- City: Lahore
- Tehsil: Model Town

Mochi Pura (Punjabi, Urdu: موچی پورہ) is a locality located within Model Town Tehsil of Lahore, Punjab, Pakistan. It has a population of about 10,000 people. More than half of them are not permanent citizens of Lahore, i.e., students living in rented rooms or families working in nearby wealthy areas like Model Town and Faisal Town.

== Location ==
Mochi Pura is situated between Township, Faisal Town, Johar Town, Model Town and Model Town Link Road. It is part of Model Town Tehsil.

== Living conditions ==
Most of the living necessities are below standard in Mochi Pura. Although it is densely populated, it has an insufficient sewerage system, water supply system and power supply system.

== Mosques ==
There are four important mosques in Mochi Pura namely Masjid Noor, Madina Masjid, Rehman Masjid and a small but beautiful Meraj Masjid.
