= Islamnagar =

Islamnagar (Urdu: اسلام نگر) can refer to:

- Islamnagar, Badaun, nagar panchayat in Badaun district in the Indian state of Uttar Pradesh.
- Islamnagar, Karachi, neighbourhood in Baldia Town in Karachi, Sindh, Pakistan.
- Islamnagar, Lahore, neighbourhood in Gulberg Town in Lahore, Punjab, Pakistan.
- Islamnagar, Bhopal, village and former fortified city near Bhopal, India
