= Valancia =

Valencia ویلنشیا
- Housing estate
- Interactive map of Valencia ویلنشیا
- Country: Pakistan
- Province: Punjab
- City: Lahore
- Tehsil: Model Town
- Union council No: 41

Valencia (Punjabi, Urdu: ویلنشیا) or Valancia Town, is a housing estate located within union council 41 in Model Town Tehsil of Lahore, Punjab, Pakistan. Conceived by Manzoor Ahmed, Valencia was first planned in the 1990s and construction began by PECHS through funding from Mashreq Bank. The 2000 property boom in Lahore helped populate Valencia. The housing estate is known for its well-landscaped boulevards, connecting a balanced mix of single-family detached homes, community and shopping centres. Valencia covers an area of about 1,000 acres (4.0 km^{2}). It is named after the Spanish city of Valencia.

== Blocks ==
Valencia is divided into blocks, with each block consisting of a dedicated greenspace and playground, commercial hubs. Defence Road and Pine Ave serve as the main entry/exit points of Valancia.

== Location ==
Valencia is a peaceful and quiet suburban locality located on the outers of NFC Housing Society and WAPDA Town.

== Infrastructure ==
=== Facilities ===
- Independent water supply
- Sewage & garbage disposal
- Independent filtration plants
- Society's own security
- Fiber to home service

=== Amenities ===
- Valencia Central Mosque
- Valencia Community Centre
- Valencia Football Club
- Valencia Horse & Riding Club
- Valencia Cricket Club
- Valencia Amusement Parks
- Aashiyana Cycling Club

== Communication ==
Telecommunication services are provided by all major telecom companies in Lahore. PTCL is the major landline and wireless local loop provider as well as WorldCom and BrainTel. Cable TV is provided by local operators in the community. Internet and broadband services are provided by Ptcl and storm fiber. In 2018 stormfiber and PTCL have launched their GPON services in Valencia.

== Masjid ==
A grand Valancia Central Masjid is situated in the center of Valancia. It is located near to Valancia Community Centre and cater for religious needs of the local residents.

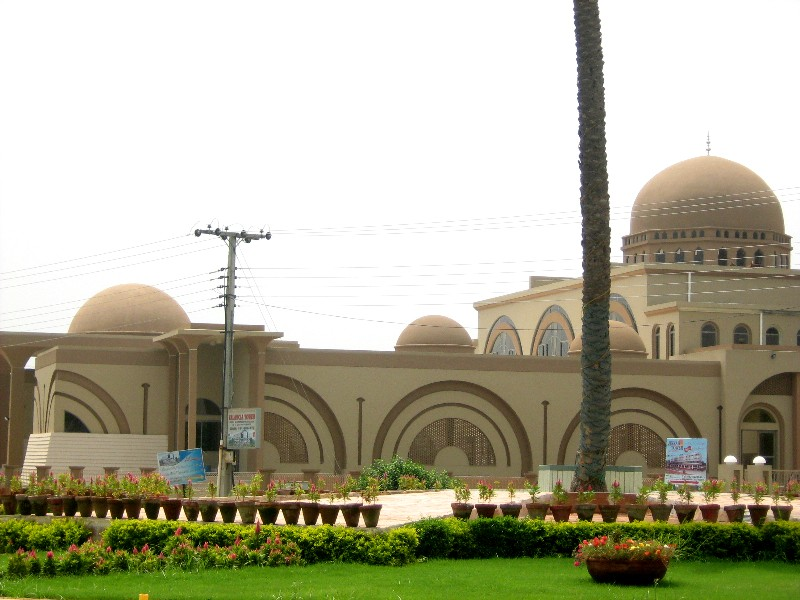
Valancia Central Masjid

== Homes ==
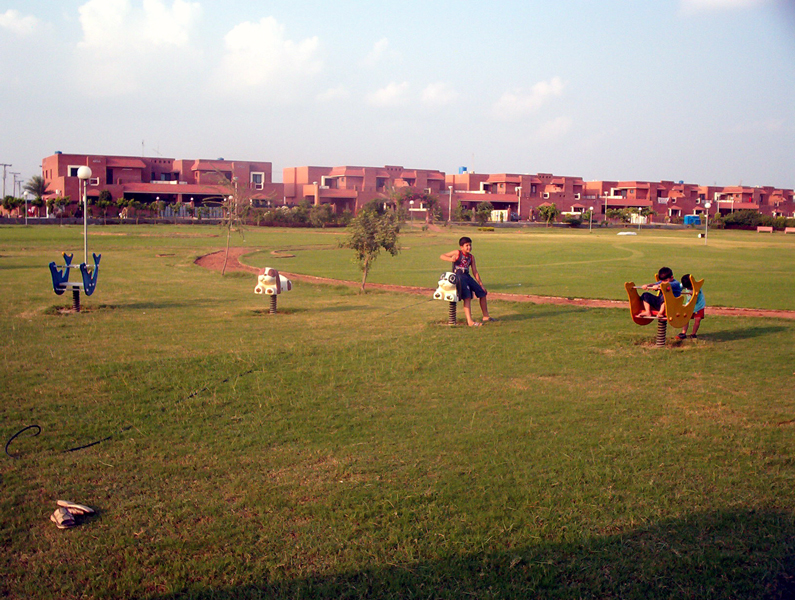
One of Valancia Parks

In addition to residential plots for development by the owners and developers, PECHS has developed constructed ready to move Valencia Homes on 5, 10 and 15 marla plots and are custom designed for expatriate Pakistanis living presently in the Middle East, USA, UK and Europe. These are elegant two-floor housing units offers affordable housing.

== Banks ==
Following banks branches are present in Valancia:

- Faysal Bank
- MCB Bank
- Habib Metropolitan Bank
- UBL Ameen Valencia Branch
- Sindh Bank
- Meezan Bank
- Askari Commercial Bank
- Habib Bank Limited
- Bank Al Habib
- Dubai Islamic Bank
- Bank Islami
- Allied Bank
- National Bank
- Bank of Punjab

== Healthcare ==
The nearest major hospital is Shaukat Khanum Memorial Cancer Hospital & Research Centre built by cricketer turned politician Imran Khan and Jinnah Hospital. Local clinics include:

- Hameeda Memorial Hospital
- Rehana Mushtaq Clinic
- Oral Square (A complete family and cosmetic dentistry)

== Education ==
Major schools in Valencia and in surrounding area include:

- Beaconhouse Valencia
- Dar-e-arqam School
- The Educators Valencia
- Misber College
- Academia De Avoures
- American Lycetuff
- The Smart School
- Lahore Grammar School
- Mian Grammar International School
- International School Lahore [Nearby ( Powered By Valencia Electrical Grid )

== Transport ==
Daewoo Busses in Valancia

Other modes of commuting remain private cars, Rikshaw, and bikes.

== See also ==
- Wapda Town
- Johar Town
