= Dharampura =

Residential neighbourhood in Lahore, Pakistan

Dharampura دھرم پورا Mustafabad, Lahore
- Neighbourhood
- Interactive map of Dharampura دھرم پورا
- Country: Pakistan
- Province: Punjab
- City: Lahore
- Tehsil: Lahore Cantt
- Established: 1583

Dharampura (Punjabi: دھرم پورا) is a residential neighbourhood located in Aziz Bhatti Town, Lahore, the capital city of Pakistan's Punjab province.

The Mughal emperor Akbar laid the foundation of this colony for Hindus as an alms-house in 1583.

After the Partition of India in 1947, it was renamed Mustafabad but was still popularly known as Dharampura among the public. In 2026, Mustafabad was renamed Dharampura once more.

Dharampura sits on the western bank of the Nahr, between the Walled City of Lahore and the Lahore Cantonment. It is a largely working class neighbourhood. The area was largely populated by Hindus and Sikhs prior to the Partition of British India in 1947.

The locality is also the ancestral home of Sushma Swaraj, who was a lawyer of the Supreme Court of India and a Minister of External Affairs of India.

Baba Sain Mir Mohammed Sahib, popularly known as Mian Mir, was a famous Sufi Muslim saint who resided in Dharampura.

Mustafabad Bazar is a popular bazar also known as Dharampura Bazar in Lahore. It is a famous food bazaar of the city, similar to Gawalmandi. It is also well known for groceries and clothes.
