= Mustafa Town =

Coordinates: 31°29′45″N 74°16′25″E

Mustafa Town شهرک مصطفی
- Neighbourhood
- Interactive map of Mustafa Town
- Country: Pakistan
- Province: Punjab
- City: Lahore
- Administrative town: Samanabad
- Union council: 109 (Sikandar)

Mustafa Town (Punjabi, Urdu: ٹاؤن مصطفی) is a neighbourhood located within union council 109 (Sikander) in Samanabad Tehsil of Lahore, Punjab, Pakistan. It is located on Wahdat Road and Old Multan Road Chungi. The neighbourhood was developed by the Lahore Development Authority. It borders Education Town, Ghani Colony and Mansoorah to the west. It is opposite Allama Iqbal Town across Wahdat Road.

== Blocks ==
- Mamdot Block
- Hadayat Ullah Block
- Qayyum Block
- Abbas Block
- Shahbaz Block
- Ahmed Yar Block
