= NFC Employees Cooperative Housing Society =

- Housing estate
- NFCHS Central Masjid
- Country: Pakistan
- Province: Punjab
- City: Lahore
- Administrative town: Nishtar
- Constituency: Constituency NA-128

NFC Employees Cooperative Housing Society or NFCHS is a housing estate located within union council 144 (Haloke), Constituency NA-134, in the administrative town of Nishtar of Lahore, Punjab, Pakistan.

== History ==
The housing estate was founded by the employees of the National Fertilizer Corporation of Pakistan. NFCHS is divided into NFCHS I and NFCHS II. NFCHS I is a town managed and controlled by the executive committee of society elected after every three years by the residents of society via elections. The estate is divided into four portions called "Blocks" (Block A, Block B, Block C and Block D). Plot cutting is in four Kanals, two Kanals, one Kanal and ten Marlas with separate and respective roads, avenues and streets. Society has two Jamia Mosques, a market area, a civic centre, a monumental central park with ten small parks, wide roads, public and private transport facility, water and sanitation system, State of the art street lights, security and direct approach to M-2 motorway.

== Location ==
It is surrounded by WAPDA Town, Valancia and Tariq Gardens. The objectives of society include the promotion of economic interests of its members and providing them with the highest level of quality life.
