= Data Gunj Bakhsh Zone =

Subdivision in Lahore, Punjab, Pakistan

Data Gunj Buksh
- Tehsil
- Country: Pakistan
- Province: Punjab
- City District: Lahore

Data Gunj Bakhsh is an administrative zone in Lahore, Punjab, Pakistan. It forms one of 10 zones of the Lahore metropolitan area.

== Neighbourhoods ==
- Kasurpura (UC 67)
- Ameenpura (UC 68)
- Kareem Bagh (UC 69)
- Ganj Kalan (UC 70)
- Bilal Gunj (UC 71)
- Anarkali (UC 72)
- Gawalmandi (UC 73)
- Sare Sultan (UC 74)
- Qila Gujar Singh (UC 77)
- Race Course Park (UC 78)
- Mozang (UC 79)
- Jinnah Hall (UC 80)
- Rizwan Bagh (UC 81)
- Islampura (UC 65)
- Chohan Bagh (UC 83)
- Sanda (UC 85)
- Sanda Khurd (UC 86)
- Shadman (UC 94)

== See also ==
- Lahore City District
