= The City School (Pakistan) =

Private institution in Pakistan's education sector

City School
- TCS
- Pakistan, United Arab Emirates, Saudi Arabia, Philippines, Malaysia, Oman

Information
- Funding type: Private
- Motto: "I Am To Learn"
- Established: 1978
- Gender: Co-education
- Enrollment: 150,000+ students
- Classes offered: O and AS/A level, Matriculation, [Fs.c]
- Language: English-medium education
- Regions: 49
- Branches: 165+
- Website: https://thecityschool.edu.pk/

The City School (abbreviated as TCS) is an education company founded in 1978, which operates over 160 English-medium primary and secondary schools in 49 cities across Pakistan along with joint venture projects in UAE, Saudi Arabia, Philippines and Malaysia. They claimed to have a total of 150,000 students enrolled as of 2018.

Its primary school is based on curriculum derived from the UK's National Curriculum, while its secondary school education is divided between the local Pakistani curriculum and the Cambridge regulated international GCE programs. The school's head office is based in Lahore with regional offices in Karachi,Lahore, Islamabad and Dubai.

== Campuses and Branches ==
- Some of the prominent campuses are:

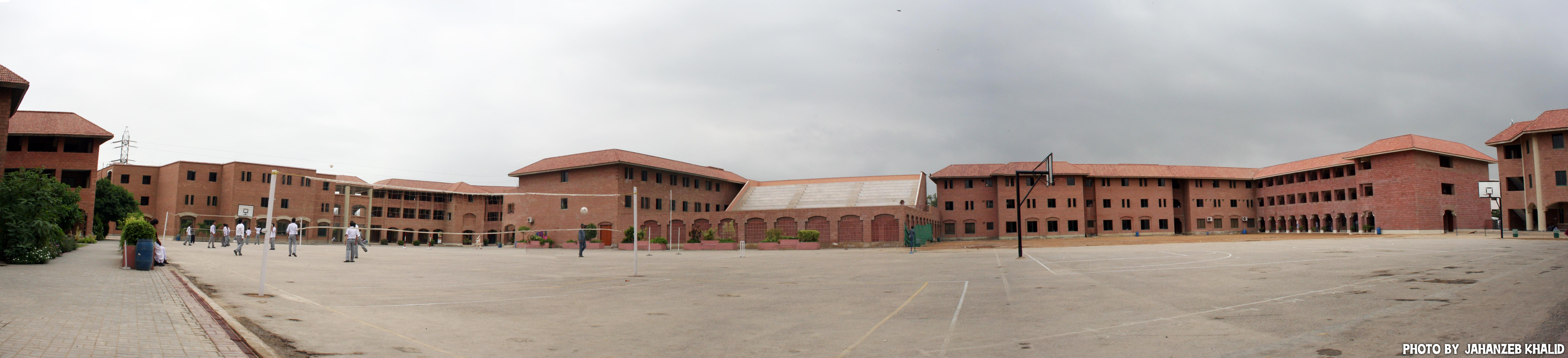
The City School, PAF Chapter main campus, 25 August 2009

=== Head Office ===
- 31-Industrial Area, Gurumangat Road, Gulberg III, Lahore, Pakistan.

=== Southern Region ===
==== Karachi ====
- PAF Chapter is located at Shaheed-e-Millat Extension, Off Shahrah-e-Faisal, Karachi. It is a co-educational campus and offers education from Playgroup to A Level.
- Darakhshan Campus located at Kayabane-e-Bukhari is a co-educational campus, From class 4 to O Level.
- PECHS Campus located in Mehmoodabad

===== Gulshan Network =====
- Gulshan Campus A is a boys campus located at PB 4, Block B N.C.E.C.H.S Block 10-A Gulshan-e-Iqbal, Karachi. It offers education from grades 7 to 11 (O-Levels) and 9th grade Matriculation.
- Gulshan Campus B is located at PB 4, Block B N.C.E.C.H.S Block 10-A Gulshan-e-Iqbal, Karachi. It is a co-educational campus and offers education from playgroup to grade 8.
- Gulshan Campus C is a girls campus located at ST-4A, Block 7, Gulshan-e-Iqbal, Karachi. It is a girls only branch. It offers education from grades 6 to 11 (O-Levels).
- Gulshan Junior Campus is located at E-61, 62, Block 7 Gulshan-e-Iqbal, Karachi. It is a co-educational campus and offers education from grades 3 to 5, rumors of The City school converting it into a boys only campus starting from grade 6 ending at an unknown grade have spread.
- Gulshan A Level Campus: is a branch for students who opt for A Level. It is located at E-21/22, Block 7, Gulshan-e-Iqbal.
- Other branches in Gulshan Network: Gulshan Junior A, Gulshan Junior B, Gulshan Junior C, Gulshan Junior D, Gulshan Junior E and Gulshan Junior F.

===== North Nazimabad Network =====
- North Nazimabad Junior Boys located at F- 73, Block B, North Nazimabad
- North Nazimabad Prep Girls located at F-126/I, Block F, North Nazimabad
- North Nazimabad Senior Girls located at F - 126, Block F, North Nazimabad
- North Nazimabad Boys Campus located at D-28, D-29, Block 'D' North Nazimabad
- Other branches include North Nazimabad The City Nursery I, North Nazimabad The City Nursery II, North Nazimabad Junior A, North Nazimabad Junior B, North Nazimabad Junior C.

===== Hyderabad =====
- Jinnah Campus, Qasimabad, Hyderabad. Coeducational branch; Playgroup to O/A Levels and SSC/HSC.
- Liaquat Campus, Kohsar, Hyderabad. Coeducational Branch; Playgroup to O Levels and SSC/HSC.

===== Sukkur =====
- Indus Campus Sukkur is purpose-built campus offering Playgroup to O Level and Matric

=== Central Region ===
==== Lahore ====
- DHA Campus is located at 296-B, Phase-VI, DHA Lahore Gulberg III. It offers education from Playgroup to O/A Levels.
- Shalimar Campus is a branch located at 32 Industrial Area, Gurumangat Road, Gulberg III. It offers education from Class 1 to O Level.
- Paragon Campus is a co educational branch located at Plot No.33, Paragon City, Barki Road, Lahore. It offers education from Playgroup to O Levels
- Ravi Campus is a coeducational branch located at 303/304 Block H-III, Johar Town. It offers education from Playgroup to A Levels, including GCE O, AS and A Levels.
- Gulberg Nursery Branch
- Gulberg A-Level Campus
- Iqbal Town Campus is a coeducational branch located at 143 Rachna Block, Allama Iqbal Town. It offers education from Playgroup to Class 2.
- Model Town Junior Campus is a coeducational branch located at 12 Block B Model Town. It offers education from Playgroup to Grade IV.
- Model Town Campus is a coeducational branch located at 202 Block M, Model Town. It offers education from Playgroup to Class 11, including GCE O Levels.
- Shadman Nursery Branch
- Muslim Town Campus is divided into branches, 100-A that offers education from Playgroup to (class 2 for girls) Class 5(coeducational), 105-A is boys branch that offers education from class 6 to GCE O Levels class 11 and 110-A is girls branch that offers education from class 3 to GCE O Levels class 11.
- Model Town Link Road Campus is a coeducational branch located at Peco Road, Township Lahore. It offers education from Playgroup to O Level and Matric.

==== Faisalabad ====
- Chenab Campus is offering education from playgroup to A Level and Matric.

==== Sialkot ====
- Iqbal Campus Sialkot is offering education from playgroup to A level and Matric.

=== Northern Region ===
==== Islamabad ====
- Capital Campus, Islamabad is located at Pitras Bokhari Road (H-8) and is offering education from class 1 to A Level.
- E-11 Campus is offering education from playgroup to A Level. After Class 8, students have the option to choose between Matric and GCE O Level.

==== Chakwal ====
- Chakwal campus is offering education from Playgroup to O Level.Located at Talagang road near PAF Base Murid

==== Attock ====
- Attock campus, located at kamra road is offering education from playgroup to O level

== Curriculum ==
=== Preschool and Class 1-5 ===
- ICT
- Arts
- English
- Social Studies
- Islamiyat
- Mathematics
- Music
- Science
- Physical Education
- Urdu

=== Class 6-8 ===
- English
- Geography
- History
- Information

=== Class 9-11 (O Level) ===
==== Compulsory ====
- English
- Islamiyat
- Mathematics
- Pakistan Studies
- Urdu

==== Electives: Science ====
- Biology
- Chemistry
- Computer Studies
- Physics
- Additional Mathematics Optional

==== Electives: Commerce ====
- Business Studies
- Economics
- Accounting Since 2020

Additional Mathematics Optional

==== Electives: Humanities ====
- Art and Design
- Fashion and Design
- Food and Nutrition
- Home Management

=== Class A-1 and A-2 (AS/A Level) ===
==== Science Group ====
===== Pre-Medical =====
- Biology
- Chemistry
- Physics

===== IT =====
- Physics
- Mathematics
- Applied ICT

==== Pre-Engineering ====
- Physics
- Mathematics
- Further Mathematics Pure Mathematics
- Chemistry

=== Business Accounting ===
==== Group I ====
- Economics
- Accounting
- Business Studies
- URDU

==== Group II ====
- Mathematics
- Accounting
- Business Studies
- Computing

==== Group III ====
- Mathematics
- Accounting
- Business Studies
- Computing
- Economics

=== Other Subjects ===
- Art and Design
- General Paper
- Law
- Psychology
- Sociology
- Urdu
- Media Studies
- History
- Critical Thinking
- English Literature

Syeda Raiiha Batool Tirmazi 5-C
