= LDA City =

Lahore Development Authority City
- Housing Estate
- Nickname: LDA CITY
- Country: Pakistan
- Province: Punjab
- City: Lahore
- Administrative town: Nishtar
- Union council: 146 (Kahna Nau)
- Elevation: 108 m (354 ft)

Population
  - Total: 50,000 families approx. (proposed)

LDA City is a housing estate located within union council 146 (Kahna Nau) in Nishtar Tehsil of Lahore, Punjab, Pakistan.
