= Sabzazar =

Residential neighbourhood locality in Lahore, Pakistan

Sabzazar سبزہ زار
- Town
- Interactive map of Sabzazar سبزہ زار
- Country: Pakistan
- Province: Punjab
- District: Lahore

Sabzazar (Punjabi, Urdu: سبزہ زار) is a neighbourhood and union council located in Lahore City Tehsil of Lahore, Punjab, Pakistan. Sabzazar is divided into two subdivisions, phase 1 & phase 2.

It is surrounded by areas like Allama Iqbal Town, Awan Town and Lalazaar Garden.

This Lahore Development Authority housing scheme has good access to central Lahore and its outskirts. A main boulevard and a service road intersect at the center of the society. The Main Boulevard Road is home to a wide range of shops and restaurants. The 200-bed THQ Sabzazar Hospital is situated at G Block.

== Sectarian issues ==
In April 2017, the neighborhood witnessed a sectarian killing, when Ashfaq Ahmad, an Ahmadi doctor, was killed in a drive-by shooting, on his way to offer Friday prayers with his grandson. When his car slowed down, a person approached him on his bike and shot him. In Pakistan, Ahmadis have been defined as heretics and non-Muslim and have been subjected to attacks, discrimination and persecution.
