= Kot Lakhpat =

Coordinates: 31°27′57″N 74°20′14″E

Kot Lakhpat کوٹ لکھپت
- Neighbourhood
- Interactive map of Kot Lakhpat کوٹ لکھپت
- Country: Pakistan
- Province: Punjab
- City: Lahore
- Tehsil: Model Town
- Union council: 130

Kot Lakhpat (Punjabi, Urdu: کوٹ لکھپت) is a largely residential neighborhood of Model Town Tehsil in Lahore, Punjab, Pakistan. The neighborhood is both a residential and industrial area. It is located at 31° 27' 57N 74° 20' 14E.

Kot Lakhpat is bordered by the Defence Housing Society to the east and Lahore Township to the west. Kot Lakhpat railway station, Lahore Race Club, Quaid-e-Azam Industrial Estate and Central Jail Lahore, commonly known as Kot Lakhpat Jail, and Kot Lakhpat courts are situated in this neighbourhood.
