= Khiali Shahpur =

- Town
- Location within Pakistan
- Coordinates: 32.121°N 74.173°E
- Country: Pakistan
- Province: Punjab
- District: Gujranwala
- Time zone: UTC+5 (PST)

Khiali Shahpur is a town in Gujranwala District of the Punjab province in Pakistan.

== History ==
Khiali and Shahpur were originally two separate villages about two miles away from Gujranwala district courts. Both towns were about one acre away from the single lane Sheikhupura road. Khiali was a very old village. The Sansi clan is Hindu by origin and according to historians were the people living in ancient Gujranwala. There were few Sansi villages, which are all now part of greater Gujranwala. As the majority of the Sansis fled to India, a number of families from India migrated here. Another famous and old rooted family of khiali is the Rana family. This family is widely known for political background.A number of mosques, schools and welfare hospitals are patronised by the Rana family of khiali.Rana family were known to be migrated from Hoshiyarpur India. Rana Naseer Ullah Khan is known to be a famous personality and landlord was also known as the king of khiali

== Environmental conditions ==
It is mostly an industrial area, thus forced to pollute the environment and as it is comparatively more developed, the people take less precautionary measures to prevent most of the pollution. This leads to Land Constraint.

== Location ==
The town is located between a bus stand connecting with the Grand Trunk Road and the Khiali Bypass. West of the Khiali Bypass is a road which leads to the Grand Trunk Road and also to Wapda Town, Gujranwala.
