= Islamnagar, Karachi =

Residential neighbourhood in Baldia Town, Karachi, Pakistan

Coordinates: 32°36′N 74°04′E

Islam Nagar (Urdu: اسلام نگر) is a residential neighbourhood and part of Baldia Town in the Karachi West district of Karachi, Pakistan.

== See also ==
- Islamnagar, Badaun
- Islamnagar, Lahore
