= Mohsin Naqvi (poet) =

Pakistani poet (1947-1996)

- Born: Syed Ghulam Abbas Naqvi; 10 May 1947; Dera Ghazi Khan, Punjab, British India (modern-day Pakistan)
- Died: 15 January 1996 (aged 48); Lahore, Punjab, Pakistan
- Occupation: Poet
- Writing career
- Genre: Ghazal
- Subject: philosophy

Mohsin Naqvi (10 May 1947 − 15 January 1996) was a Pakistani poet, known for his ghazals.

== Early life and education ==
Naqvi was born on 10 May 1947 in Dera Ghazi Khan, Punjab, British India (now in Pakistan) as Ghulam Abbas Naqvi. His father, Syed Chirag Hussain Shah, was a saddlemaker and food vendor. He later became known by his pen name, Mohsin Naqvi. Naqvi had six siblings. His son Syed Aqeel Mohsin Naqvi is also a poet, whose poetry is also mainly concerned with Muhammad and Ahlulbait.

Naqvi graduated from Government College Bosan Road in Multan and later earned his master's degree from the University of the Punjab, Lahore.

== Career ==
Naqvi became known as the poet of the Ahl al-Bayt. His poetry about the Battle of Karbala is recited all over Pakistan.

Naqvi published multiple books of poetry during his lifetime. He studied the basics of poetry from Rafiq Khawar Jaskani, a poet, in Dera Ghazi Khan.

== Death ==
Naqvi was assassinated in a drive-by shooting on 15 January 1996 near Moon Market, one of the main markets of Lahore.

== Publications ==
A partial list of Urdu poetry books of Naqvi:

- Azaab-e-Deed
- Khaima-e-Jaan
- Berg-e-Sehra
- Band-e-Kbaa
- Mauj-e-idraak
- Tulu-e-ashk
- Furat-e-fikr
- Reza-e-harf
- Rakht-e-shab
- Rida-e-khaab
- Haq-e-Aeliya
- Mata-e-Dard

== See also ==
- List of Pakistani poets
