= Abdalian Cooperative Housing Society =

- Housing estate
- Country: Pakistan
- Province: Punjab
- City: Lahore
- Administrative town: Gulberg
- Union council: 120 (Ali Raza Abad)

Abdalian Cooperative Housing Society is a housing estate located within union council 120 (Ali Raza Abad) in Iqbal Tehsil of Lahore, Punjab, Pakistan.
