= Awan Town =

Residential neighborhood in Lahore, Pakistan

Coordinates: 33°37′N 72°59′E

Awan Town اعوان ٹاؤن
- Union Council
- Rizwan Masjid
- Interactive map of Awan Town اعوان ٹاؤن
- Country: Pakistan
- Province: Punjab
- City: Lahore
- Administrative town: Iqbal Town, Lahore
- Union council: 105

Government
  - Type: Union Council

Awan Town (Urdu: اعوان ٹاؤن) is a residential neighbourhood and union council (UC 110) located in Allama Iqbal Zone of Lahore, Punjab, Pakistan. Awan Town is a predominantly middle-class residential neighbourhood located on Multan Road. Awan Town is divided into 8 residential blocks.

- Ahmad Block
- Ali Block
- Jinnah Block
- Kausar Block
- Madina Block
- Qutab Block
- Rizwan Block
- Usman Block

== See also ==
- Hassan Town
