= Nayyar Ali Dada =

Pakistani architect

- Born: 11 November 1943 (age 82); Delhi, British India
- Education: National College of Arts
- Occupation: Architect
- Awards: Hilal-i-Imtiaz (Crescent of Excellence) Award in 2018; Pride of Performance Award in 1992; Aga Khan Award for Architecture in 1998

Nayyar Ali Dada (Urdu: نیر علی دادا) (born 11 November 1943) is a Pakistani architect.

== Early life and education ==
Nayyar Ali Dada was born on 11 November 1943 in Delhi, British India. His family migrated to Lahore, Pakistan, in the 1950s. After finishing his basic education at the University of Punjab, Lahore in 1957, he enrolled in the National College of Arts (NCA), Lahore, as a student. In 1964, he graduated from NCA and chose to remain attached to it by working there as a teacher. The principal of NCA Shakir Ali and Dada became friends. According to the Overseas Pakistanis Foundation website, "The relationship with Shakir Ali (the principal of NCA) grew, and the two became close friends. As a token of friendship, Nayyar designed Shakir Ali's house in Garden Town, Lahore (now the Shakir Ali Museum)."

== Works ==
Buildings associated with Dada include:

- Shakir Ali Museum, Lahore (1982)
- Grand Mosque, Lake City, Lahore
- Lake City Downtown Commercial, Lahore
- Grand Jamia Mosque, Lahore, Bahria Town
- Alhamra Arts Council, Lahore (1981)
- BCCI Bank in Colombo, Sri Lanka
- Beaconhouse National University, Tarogil Campus, Lahore
- Faisalabad Arts Council
- Gaddafi Stadium, Lahore
- Serena Hotel, Islamabad
- Lal Masjid, Islamabad (2010)
- Bagh-e-Jinnah, Lahore (restored the historic garden)
- Shaukat Khanum Memorial Cancer Hospital & Research Centre
- Vogue Towers (a shopping mall in Lahore, Pakistan; 2010)
- Lahore Zoo
- Quaid-e-Azam Library (Lahore)
- The Defence Revelation (Lahore)
- Dr. Parvez Hassan Environmental Law Centre , University Law College, University of the Punjab, Lahore

== Awards and recognition ==
- Pride of Performance Award by the Government of Pakistan in 1992
- Aga Khan Award for Architecture in 1998
- Sitara-i-Imtiaz (Star of Excellence) Award by the President of Pakistan in 2003
- Hilal-i-Imtiaz (Crescent of Excellence) Award by the President of Pakistan in 2018
