= Syed Salman Gilani =

Pakistani poet and naat reciter (1951–2026)

- سید سلمان گیلانی
- Born: 7 September 1951; Lahore, Pakistan
- Died: 21 February 2026 (aged 74); Lahore, Pakistan
- Resting place: Mustafa Town cemetery, Lahore, Pakistan
- Occupations: Poet, naat reciter, writer
- Known for: Devotional and humorous poetry
- Father: Syed Amin Gilani

Syed Salman Gilani (7 September 1951 – 21 February 2026) was a Pakistani poet, naat reciter, and writer from Lahore. He was known for his devotional poetry, particularly on the subject of Khatm-e-Nabuwwat (Finality of Prophethood), as well as for humorous and satirical verse. He was the son of Syed Amin Gilani, a religious leader associated with the Khatm-e-Nabuwwat movement.

== Biography ==
Syed Salman Gilani was born on 7 September 1951 in Lahore, Pakistan. He was the son of Syed Amin Gilani, who was known for his association with the Khatm-e-Nabuwwat movement.

He grew up in a religious and literary environment and was influenced by his father's work and associations.

Gilani was active as a poet and naat reciter in literary and religious circles. He was known for reciting both devotional and non-devotional poetry at gatherings, including mushairas in Pakistan and abroad.

He participated as a humorous poet at an Aalmi Mushaira in Karachi in 2012.

In August 2015, he was among the poets who participated in the Mehfil-e-Urdu poetry session held in Dubai, organised by Bazm-e-Urdu, where poets from India and Pakistan shared the stage.

In March 2023, he was among the poets who presented their work at the Lyallpur Literature and Art Festival held at the University of Agriculture, Faisalabad.

In February 2026, he also participated in the Munir Niazi Literary Festival organised by the Punjab Council of Arts at the Nusrat Fateh Ali Khan Auditorium in Faisalabad.

His poetry was associated with two main themes: devotional verse, particularly on Khatm-e-Nabuwwat, and humorous or satirical poetry addressing social issues. Some of his naat compositions were recorded by various naat reciters.

He also appeared on news channels and participated in literary events and public gatherings.

He travelled frequently to Saudi Arabia and wrote about his experiences of pilgrimage in newspaper columns later compiled in book form.

== Literary works ==
Gilani authored poetry collections and prose works, including:

- Meri Baatain Hain Yaad Rakhne Ki (Things of Mine Worth Remembering) – autobiography.
- Abduhu Rasooluhu – collection of hamd and naat poetry.
- Main Hoon Andaleeb-e-Bat'ha (I Am the Nightingale of Bat'ha) – naat collection.
- Hareef-e-Sang (Rival of the Stone) – ghazal collection.
- Thora Jeha Hans Lo (Laugh a Little) – Punjabi humorous poetry.
- Sulloli Sulloli – humorous poetry collection.
- Inhay Waa – humorous poetry collection.
- Bujhay Chiraghon Ki Roshni (The Light of Extinguished Lamps) – ghazals (reported as forthcoming).
- Naqoosh-e-Huzoori (Impressions of Presence) – travelogue based on pilgrimage journeys.

== Death and legacy ==
Gilani died on 21 February 2026 in Lahore at the age of 74 after a prolonged illness.

He had been receiving treatment at Sheikh Zayed Hospital for heart- and liver-related complications. He had recently undergone bypass surgery and later developed pneumonia. Gilani is survived by a son and two daughters.

His funeral prayers were offered at Jamia Ashrafia, Lahore, and he was buried at Mustafa Town Cemetery. The funeral prayer was led by Islamic scholar Muhib-un-Nabi and attended by religious scholars, political figures, and members of the public.

Condolences were expressed by Jamiat Ulema-e-Islam (F) chief Fazlur Rehman and writer Zahid Ur Rashidi. Punjab Chief Minister Maryam Nawaz Sharif issued a statement expressing sympathy with the bereaved family.

Speaker of the National Assembly Sardar Ayaz Sadiq also issued a condolence message, referring to Gilani's contributions to Urdu poetry and naat recitation.
