= Samanabad Sports Arena =

Sports arena in Samanabad, Lahore, Pakistan

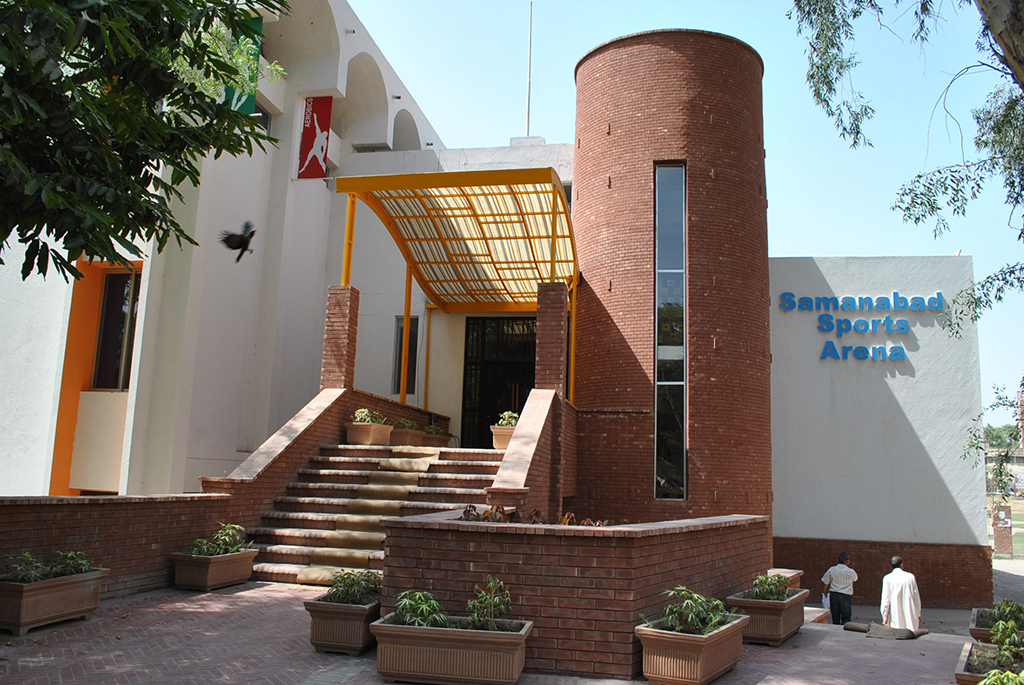
A view of Samanabad Sports Arena.

Samanabad Sports Arena is a multifunctional sports arena in Samanabad, Lahore, Pakistan. It is owned by the Lahore Parks and Horticulture Authority. It spans an area of more than 2 hectares.

== History ==
Samanabad Sports Arena was established in 1981 by the Lahore Development Authority (LDA). With the formation of the PHA in 1998, the sports arena was handed over to the PHA that same year. The stadium was partially rehabilitated in 2013.

== Facilities ==
Facilities provided by Samanabad Sports Arena (SSA) to registered members include:

- Swimming pool
- Badminton
- Gym
- Squash
- Table Tennis
- Taekwando
- Aerobics
- Snooker
- Parking for vehicles of members
