= Moon Market, Lahore =

Market area in Lahore, Pakistan

The Moon Market (Urdu: مون مارکیٹ) is a large, popular market area situated in the suburb of Allama Iqbal Town in Lahore, Pakistan. The market is home to hundreds of shops, food stalls, restaurants, recreational spaces, grocery and entertainment stores.

== Parking facilities ==
In March 2016, Lahore Development Authority decided to auction off already constructed 67 shops to the highest bidder in an open auction to encourage trade and business activity in Lahore. This 10 storey Parking Plaza Building's two floors had been reserved exclusively for shopping purposes. Moon Market's Parking Plaza building can accommodate 400 vehicles and 500 motorbikes at a time. Future plans are to construct a rooftop restaurant to offer a bird's eye view of the surrounding area for the diners.
