= Hassan Town =

Residential neighborhood in Lahore, Pakistan

Coordinates: 32°31′N 74°36′E

Hassan Town حسن ٹاؤن
- Neighbourhood
- Interactive map of Hassan Town حسن ٹاؤن
- Country: Pakistan
- Province: Punjab
- City: Lahore
- Administrative town: Allama Iqbal Zone
- Union council: 105 (Hassan Town)

Hassan Town (Punjabi, Urdu: حسن ٹاؤن, Shahrak-e-Hassan) is a residential neighbourhood located within union council 105 in Iqbal Town, Lahore of Lahore, Punjab, Pakistan.

Hassan Town is on the main Multan Road, about 5 kilometers away from Motorway (M2).
