= Walton Cantonment =

Military base in Punjab, Pakistan

Coordinates: 31.487382°N 74.354095°E

Walton Cantonment is a cantonment area situated in Lahore, Punjab, Pakistan. It is named after Sir Cusach Walton, son of British railway engineer Frederick Walton.

== History ==
Lahore Cantonment with its increasing population and extensions to the boundaries had become difficult to manage and in 1998 it was bifurcated into two administrative divisions, Lahore Cantonment and the new Walton Cantonment.

According to the Zoning Plan of Walton Cantt., the cantonment is spread over 4,046 ha (10,000 acres). The estimated population is about 700,000.

== Education ==
- Civil Services Academy
- Pakistan Navy War College

== Neighbourhoods ==
- Cavalry Ground

== Walton railway station ==
Walton railway station is a railway station located in Walton Cantonment. It is one of the urban stations of Lahore served by commuter trains. A large number of commuters use this station to get access to the city of Lahore.
