= Education Town =

Education Town ایجوکیشن ٹاؤن
- Housing estate
- Location within Punjab, Pakistan
- Coordinates: 31°29′39″N 74°16′10″E
- Country: Pakistan
- Province: Punjab
- City: Lahore
- Administrative town: Iqbal
- Union council: 117 (Hanjarwal)

Education Town (Punjabi, Urdu: ایجوکیشن ٹاؤن) is a housing estate located within union council 117 (Hanjarwal) in Iqbal Tehsil of Lahore, Punjab, Pakistan.
