= Faisal Town =

Neighbourhood residential locality in Lahore, Pakistan

Coordinates: 31°29′N 74°18′E

Faisal Town فیصل ٹاؤن
- Neighbourhood
- Interactive map of Faisal Town فیصل ٹاؤن
- Country: Pakistan
- Province: Punjab
- City: Lahore
- Tehsil: Model Town
- Union council No: 62

Government
  - Type: Union Council

Faisal Town (Punjabi, Urdu: فیصل ٹاؤن) is a union council and neighbourhood of Model Town Tehsil in Lahore, in Punjab, Pakistan.

== Subdivisions ==
Faisal Town is divided into four residential blocks - A, B, C and D.

== Administration ==
Faisal Town comprises union council 62 of Model Town Tehsil.

== Markets ==
The biggest market is located in C Block and is commonly called Civic Centre. There is a smaller market in B Block called Kotha Pind market. The roads around Faisal Town are becoming increasingly commercial, especially the road between Faisal Town and Johar Town. Some of the well known wholesale and retail stores near the Lahore campus of FAST University (in B Block) include Ali General Store and Hassan Store. Maqsood Store and Chishti Super Store are the popular stores in D Block.

== Mosques ==
A Block has a mosque called Abu Bakar Mosque. B Block has two mosques: one is called Be-izn-Allah Mosque and the other is the Kotha Pind Mosque. C Block houses two mosques as well.

== Educational institutions ==
- St Anthony's High School
- National University of Computer and Emerging Sciences (B Block)
- Government Girls School (B Block)
- Cathedral School (D Block)
- Lahore Grammar School (373-C, Faisal Town, Lahore)

== Medical facilities ==
There is a private hospital in A Block. In C Block there is another Trust Hospital named Khair-un-Nisa Hospital. Renowned physician Faisal Masud also lived in C block, Faisal Town where he had his clinic.

== Parks ==
A Block has a large park with associated small parks. B Block also has a big park called Milad Park. C Block has two parks next to the two mosques. D block also has a park.
