= Iqbal Tehsil =

Tehsil in Lahore, Punjab, Pakistan

Iqbal Tehsil تحصیل اقبال
- Tehsil
- Country: Pakistan
- Province: (Punjab, Pakistan) Punjab
- District: Lahore
- Capital: Raiwind road, Lahore
- Union councils: 37

Government
  - Type: Town Corporation
  - Mayor: N/A
  - Assistant Commissioner: Abdul Sami Sheikh
- Time zone: UTC+5 (PST)
  - Summer (DST): UTC+6 (PDT)

Iqbal Tehsil (Urdu, Punjabi: تحصیل اقبال) is a tehsil in Lahore, Punjab, Pakistan. It forms one of the 10 tehsils and municipalities of Lahore.

== Union councils ==
- Marghzar Colony (UC 1)
- Awan Town (UC 2)
- Alhamd Park Marghzar (UC 3)
- National Park (UC 4)
- Rana Town (UC 5)
- Jamil Town Roshan Park (UC 6)
- Niaz Baig (UC 7)
- Mureed Wal (UC 8)
- Amna Park Hanjarwal (UC 9)
- Hanjarwal (UC 10)
- Gulshan Town (UC 11)
- Mustafa Town (UC 12)
- Azam Garden (UC 13)
- Canal View (UC 14)
- Johar Town H Block (UC 15)
- Johar Town J Block (UC 16)
- Samsani Khoi (UC 17)
- Shadiwal (UC 18)
- Rasool Pura (UC 19)
- Saif Solar (UC 20)
- West Wood Colony (UC 21)
- Ali Raza Abad (UC 22)
- Azeemabad (UC 23)
- Jhugian Ameen Pura (UC 24)
- Bhobatian (UC 25)
- Bilal Town Sharja Colony (UC 26)
- Tibba (UC 27)
- Jalyana Pind (UC 28)
- Kun Jalyana (UC 29)
- Panj Garian (UC 30)
- Kamboh Colony Chung (UC 31)
- Rori Pir Masoom Shah Chung (UC 32)
- Azmir Town (UC 33)
- Shahpur Kanjran (UC 34)
- EME Society (UC 35)
- Shahpur Khanpur (UC 36)
- Gopay Ray (UC 37)

== See also ==
- Allama Iqbal Town
