= Foundation Public School =

Pakistani chain of private schools

- Knowledge is Power
- Karachi and Hyderabad (in Sindh); Islamabad (Islamabad Capital Territory)

Information
- Type: Private
- Motto: Forever Perform to Succeed
- Established: 1981; 45 years ago
- Founder: Yasmin R. Minhas & Sabiha Mohammad
- Director: Raza Kamal Minhas
- Faculty: 500
- Grades: 1 to 13
- Enrollment: 6000
- Campus type: Coeducation
- Athletics: FPSonians
- Mascot: Eagle
- Affiliation: CAIE
- Website: fps.edu.pk

Foundation Public School (FPS) are a group of private schools based in Karachi, Hyderabad and Islamabad Pakistan, educating children from the ages of three and a half to eighteen, including O and A Levels. The school has nine campuses, one in Hyderabad offering Intermediate diplomas, and was founded in 1981.

== House system ==
There are three inter houses and students are randomly divided among them at the time of admission. The houses, named after important personalities in Pakistan's history, are: Jinnah (blue) named after Muhammad Ali Jinnah, Liaquat (red) named after Liaquat Ali Khan and Iqbal ( yellow) named after Muhammad Iqbal.

Inter school sports days are part of the yearly activities including football however excluding basketball at FPS. Students compete in sports related activities and represent their respective houses. The house with the most points wins the annual sports trophy.

== Curriculum ==
FPS prepares students for the International Examinations conducted by Cambridge Assessment International Examinations (CAIE) which issues the General Certificate of Secondary Education in Ordinary Level, and/or Advanced Level examinations.

The Hyderabad campus is the only campus to offer a Matric Diploma and Intermediate Diploma under the Sindh Board of Secondary Education.

Subjects taught at FPS include Physics, Chemistry, Mathematics, Biology, Computer Studies, Pakistan Studies, Urdu, Islamic Studies, English Literature, Economics, Accounting, Business Studies, Environmental Studies, Sociology, English Language, World History, Art & Design, Additional mathematics and Economics.

All students that are citizens of Pakistan must write an examination testing their knowledge on Pakistan's History and Geography. The CIE board offers Islamiyat and Pakistan Studies to meet those requirements. Non Muslims are exempted from Islamiyat but still have to write an exam based on Pakistan's History and Geography.

Students are given an option to choose their optional subjects in grade 10 while all students are required to take the five compulsory subjects which are English as First Language, Mathematics Syllabus D, Urdu as Second Language, Islamiyat and Pakistan Studies.

The O Level examinations are given in two phases. In grade 10, all students sit for Islamiyat, Pakistan Studies and Urdu as Second Language. The remaining exams are given in grade 11 which include two compulsory subjects and five optional subjects. All examinations are written while representing FPS.

== Athletics ==
While the name FPSonians has existed it has not been used to represent FPS teams. Teammates have preferred the short acronym of the school name as the label to their team which is FPS.

FPS has formed teams in the following sports that compete regularly among other schools in the country:

- Football (soccer)
- Cricket
- Table tennis
- Throw ball

=== Football (soccer) ===
Initially when football was gaining popularity in the country there was no formal team representing FPS. Many students were playing for local clubs and later on schools across the country started forming official football teams. FPS was one of the pioneers in bringing football as a sports to school and its team soon became active in competing against other schools.

FPS has participated in championship tournaments organized by Karachi United Football Club (KUFC).

It has arranged an inter-school Football Tournament in which teams from other schools in Karachi compete against each other to win the championship.

Team players from the school have made their name in the FPS's team and later played for other schools while doing their A Levels.

=== Cricket ===
The oldest of all the teams FPS has had is the cricket team. The team has lost popularity as football is taking over but other campuses of FPS have maintained a cricket team. FPS has participated in inter-school tournaments.

=== Table tennis ===
In 2012, the table tennis team reached the finals against Beaconhouse School System (Jubilee Campus).

=== Throw ball ===
FPS has a girls' throw ball team who plays against other schools in Culligan Girls Throwball Tournament.

== Extracurricular activities ==
=== Humanitarian ===
- In July 2012, FPS sent students to participate in a seminar related to the dumping of waste in Arabian Sea that connects to the coast of Karachi.
- FPS is working on making community service work mandatory for all A-Level schools in the city. This will be a condition on all students in order to proceed to their second year of A-Levels. An activity like this is closely similar to the requirements of the Ontario Secondary School Diploma which requires students to complete a minimum of 40 hours of community service before they can graduate.

== Notable alumni ==
- Mahira Khan who is a prominent Pakistani Video jockey and actress graduated from FPS in 2001.
