= Lahore Cantonment =

Cantonment in Lahore, Pakistan

Lahore Cantonment لاہور چھاؤنی
- Cantonment
- Location within Pakistan
- Coordinates: 31°31′N 74°23′E
- Country: Pakistan
- Province: (Punjab, Pakistan) Punjab
- District: Lahore
- Tehsil: Lahore Cantt
- Neighbourhoods: 4: Cantonment; Defence Housing Authority, Lahore; Cavalry Ground; Islamnagar

Government
  - Type: Cantonment Board

Population (2017)
  - Total: 374,872

Lahore Cantonment (Urdu: لاہور چھاؤنی) is a garrison located in Lahore, Punjab, Pakistan. Although the cantonment is located within Lahore City District (UC 152), it is an independent municipality under control of the Military Lands & Cantonments Department of the Ministry of Defence. Lahore Cantonment is regarded as an upscale neighbourhood of Lahore as it mostly consists of numerous high-end housing schemes and markets.

== Neighbourhoods ==
- Cantonment
- Defence Housing Authority
- Cavalry Ground
- Islamnagar

== Military ==
Lahore Cantonment serves as the headquarters of 4 Corps. The 10th and 11th Divisions of the Pakistan Army are also based in Lahore Cantonment.

== Cemetery ==
The DHA Graveyard in Lahore is a Muslim cemetery in Lahore Cantonment, operated by the Defence Housing Authority. It is located in S-Block, Phase II (DHA) adjutant to Ghazi Road of Lahore Cantonment.

== Transportation ==
- Lahore Cantonment railway station
- Allama Iqbal International Airport

== Attractions ==
- Fortress Stadium

== See also ==
- Lahore City District
