= Aziz Bhatti Town =

Town residential locality in Lahore, Pakistan

Coordinates: 31°36′N 74°27′E

Aziz Bhatti Town عزیز بھٹی
- Tehsil
- Interactive map of Aziz Bhatti Town عزیز بھٹی
- Country: Pakistan
- Province: Punjab
- City District: Lahore
- Union Councils: 13: Harbanspura (UC 41); Rashidpura (UC 43); Fatehgarh (UC 44); Nabipura (UC 45); Mughalpura (UC 48); Mian Meer (UC 54); Mustafabad (UC 55); Ghaziabad (UC 56); Tajbagh (UC 57); Tajpura (UC 58); Al Faisal (UC 59); Guldasht (UC 60); Bhangali (UC 61)

Government
  - Type: Tehsil Municipal Administration

Aziz Bhatti Town (Punjabi, Urdu: تحصیل عزیز بھٹی) is an administrative town

(tehsil) in Lahore, Punjab, Pakistan.

It forms one of the 10 municipalities of Lahore District. The town is named after the Pakistani war hero Raja Aziz Bhatti.

== Neighbourhoods ==
- Harbanspura (UC 41)
- Rasheedpura (UC 43)
- Fatehgarh (UC 44)
- Nabipura (UC 45)
- Mughalpura (UC 48)
- Mian Meer (UC 54)
- Mustafabad (UC 55)
- Ghaziabad (UC 56)
- Tajbagh (UC 57)
- Tajpura (UC 58)
- Al Faisal (UC 59)
- Guldashat (UC 60)
- Bhangali (UC 61)

== See also ==
- Lahore City District
