= The Lyceum School =

School in Karachi, Pakistan

- مکتب لائسیم
- Main building

Location
- Karachi, Sindh; Pakistan; 24°49′07″N 67°02′03″E

Information
- School type: Independent school, Day school, Selective school
- Founded: 1987; 39 years ago
- Founder: Scheherazade Asdar Ahmad
- Status: Active
- Principal: Scheherazade Asdar Ahmad
- Gender: Co-educational
- Age: 16 to 19
- Houses: Athens; Sparta; Troy; Corinthe
- Publication: The Oracle; Lysias
- Website: www.lyceumschool.edu.pk

The Lyceum School is a private school in Karachi that specialises in a two-year long A-Level program.

It was founded in 1987, and is located on Hatim Alvi Road, in the Old Clifton area of Karachi, Pakistan. It is a co-educational institution with students ages ranging somewhere between 15–19.

== History ==
The founding members of The Lyceum include Ms. Scheherazade Ahmad and Ms. Maheen Islam to meet the need for an exclusive A level school in 1987.

== Academics ==
The Lyceum offers a number of subjects across the natural sciences, social sciences and humanities.

Subjects taught at the Lyceum School include physics, chemistry, mathematics, further mathematics, biology, computer science, English literature, Law, English language, politics, economics, accounting, history, art, psychology and sociology.

== Extracurricular activities ==
=== Round Square ===
In 2011, the Lyceum became the first school in Pakistan to be invited to become a member of the Round Square community of schools

=== Sports ===
Students are divided into Sparta, Athens, Troy and Corinthe, the different houses, with the colour of their lanyard matching their house. Sports tournaments are inter-house, city-wide, and country-wide, such as at the Lahore University of Management Sciences, where they have won many awards.

=== Debating ===
The school has won national and international debate competitions, including the Harvard Model United Nations Conference. Its parliamentary debate team won the Karachi Cup in 2019. In 2019 Lyceum was the first school to win the Rotaract Model United Nations (ROTMUN) four times in a row.

=== Clubs & societies ===
Event	Year
Liceo Scientifico	2012
LyRow	-

=== Student government ===
The student government hierarchy at The Lyceum is as follows:

1. Cabinet (President, Vice President, General Secretary, Treasurer)
2. Society Chairs
3. Representatives
4. House Captains

== Awards ==
- Qamar Bano Hussain Award for Discipline
- Rohda Vania Award for Integrity

== Notable alumni ==
- Ali Gul Pir
- Jibran Nasir
- Aamina Sheikh
- Suhaee Abro
