= Islampura =

Residential neighborhood in Lahore, Pakistan

Krishan Nagar[UR:کرشن نگر][formerly Islampura] is a residential neighborhood and a Union Council located in Data Gunj Bakhsh Zone, Lahore, Punjab, Pakistan. It is primarily a residential area located adjacent to the Punjab Secretariat. Its postal code is 54000.

== Education ==
=== Government Sector Schools ===
- Government boys high school Chishtia
- Government boys high school Islamia.
- Pakturk marif school islampura

=== Private Scector Schools ===
- M.D Junior Model and Higher Scenodary School.
- Lahore Kids Campus.
- Joan Mcdonald High School
