= Cavalry Ground =

Residential neighbourhood in Lahore, Pakistan

Cavalry Ground میدانِ رسالہ
- Neighbourhood
- Country: Pakistan
- Province: Punjab
- City: Lahore
- Tehsil: Cantonment

Cavalry Ground (میدانِ رسالہ) is a neighbourhood located within Walton Cantonment of Lahore, Punjab, Pakistan. Cavalry Ground links DHA to Gulberg. It is a mix of residential streets and commercial roads. The commercial area has outlets of all top brands and designers as well as international banks. It is widely considered one of the nicest areas of Lahore, with the balance it provides.

Masood Anwari Road serves as the central commercial area of the neighbourhood.

== History ==
In 1997, Jinnah Flyover was constructed to help ease the flow of traffic. In January 2011, Cavalry Ground was in the national media spotlight ove two major incidents. On 11 January 2011, the parents of Justice Javed Iqbal, a senior judge of the Supreme Court of Pakistan (Malik Abdul Hameed and Zarina) were found murdered under what police called "mysterious circumstances" in their house near Cavalry Ground. Preliminary investigations suggested that both had suffocated to death in their bedroom. In a separate incident almost 10 days later, it was reported that between 21 January and 27 January 2011, Raymond Davis (a detained CIA contractor) had reportedly used the residence at 59/A Cavalry Ground.

Many serving and retired army officers, including generals, live in this area, as well as having the private residences of many politicians and members of Parliament. The mosque, Khalid Masjid, is where the renowned islamic scholar Dr Malik Ghulam Murtaza led Friday prayers and tarawih.
