= Bilal Gunj =

Residential neighbourhood in Lahore, Pakistan

Bilal Gunj or Bilal Ganj is a residential neighbourhood and an automobiles market in Lahore City Tehsil of Lahore in Punjab, Pakistan.

Bilal Ganj market is situated close to Data Darbar, which is the shrine of the Sufi saint Data Ganj Baksh.
