= Ladheke =

- Village
- Location within Pakistan
- Coordinates: 31.27782°N 74.319712°E
- Country: Pakistan
- Province: Punjab
- District: Lahore
- Elevation: 200 m (660 ft)
- Time zone: UTC+5 (PST)

Ladheke is a village situated in the outskirts of Lahore near Raiwind, in Punjab, Pakistan, near the eastern border with India.

Its name is based on a Sikh public figure of the area. Chief Minister of Punjab, Mian Muhammad Shahbaz Sharif contested elections from here.
