= Islamnagar, Badaun =

Islamnagar Aryanagar
- Block, Town
- Location in Uttar Pradesh, India
- Coordinates: 28.35°N 79.02°E
- Country: India
- State: Uttar Pradesh
- District: Badaun
- Established: 16th century

Government
  - Body: Islamnagar Block development officer

Area
  - Total: 19 km^{2} (7.3 sq mi)
- Elevation: 182 m (597 ft)

Population (2011)
  - Total: 64,475
  - Density: 3,400/km^{2} (8,800/sq mi)
- Demonym: metric

Languages
  - Official: Hindi
- Time zone: UTC+5:30 (IST)
- PIN: 202523,243723
- Telephone code: 05833
- Vehicle registration: UP 24

Islamnagar is a Block and Nagar Panchayat in Badaun district in the Indian state of Uttar Pradesh.

== Demographics ==
As of 2011 India census, Islamnagar block had a population of 1,80,465, and Islamnagar city had a population of 67883. The Malesnstitute 51% of the population and females 49%. Islamnagar has an average literacy rate of 57%, lower than the national average of 67.5%: male literacy is 46%, and female literacy is 40%. There are 54 villages in islamnagar block.

Religions in Islamnagar
Religion	Percent
Hindus	31%
Muslims	67%
Christians	0.5%
Others†	0.5%
Distribution of religions †Includes Sikhs (0.01%), Buddhists (0.02%), Not stated 0.06%
