= Sanda, Lahore =

Residential neighborhood in Lahore, Pakistan

Sanda
- Neighbourhood
- Country: Pakistan
- Province: (Punjab, Pakistan) Punjab
- District: Lahore
- Tehsil: Lahore City

Sanda (Punjabi, Urdu: ساندہ) is a residential Neighbourhood in Lahore, Punjab, Pakistan, near the bank of the river Ravi and Krishan Nagar. Now old Sanda is divided into Sanda Kalan and Sanda Khurd.

This town has a history dating back to late 17th century when local landlord Malik Sadar-ud-din laid the foundation of Sanda Kalan along the Ravi bank.
