= Model Town, Lahore =

Model Town
- Neighbourhood
- Interactive map of Model Town
- Country: Pakistan
- Province: Punjab
- City: Lahore
- Tehsil: Model Town

Model Town (Punjabi, Urdu: ماڈل ٹاؤن) is a gated neighbourhood in Model Town Tehsil of Lahore in Punjab, Pakistan.

== History ==
Model Town Society Lahore

Model Town, established in 1922, was based on the philosophy of Dewan Khem Chand and the Garden city movement. The plan to found Model Town as a cooperative society was put forward at a meeting in Lahore's Town Hall under the chairmanship of Rai Bahadur Ganga Ram. Towards this end, the government was requested to provide a 4 km^{2} plot of land.

The residents of Model Town were retired judges, rich businessmen, traders, and upmarket store-owners. Many high court judges, doctors, and engineers also moved to Model Town from the city. The communist leader Baba Pyare Lal "BPL" Bedi, lived there, too. In March 2015, Saifur Rehman was elected president of the Model Town Society, marking his second term in office.

=== Model Town Society ===
Central Park and a lake of Model Town

A preliminary committee of 21 members was formed under the chairmanship of Khan Bahadur Sir Sh. Abdul Qadir to frame the by-laws and to carry out other necessary work associated with the formation of the society. As a result, The Cooperative Model Town Society Limited was formed and subsequently registered under the Cooperative Societies Act II of 1912 in 1924. The principle aims of the Society were:

- To conceive, design, develop and maintain a garden town.
- To buy or otherwise acquire land, buildings, and other moveable and immovable property.
- To provide services and construct, manage and maintain works, and other infrastructure of various kinds for the convenience and benefit of the resident members.
- To sell, mortgage, and lease land, houses, homesites, buildings, and all moveable or immovable property as necessary for carrying out the objects of the society.
- To build residential houses and other buildings for private and public use and for the convenience of members etc.

On 1 April 1941, the Government of the Punjab transferred 7.9 km² situated in Rakh, Kot Lakhpat Tehsil, District, Lahore and the transfer deed was registered with the Sub-Registrar, Lahore, on 25 April 1941.

==== Competition to select layout design (map) of Model Town ====
Dewan Khem Chand had proposed his ideas about the layout plan of the Society in his first pamphlet; this was to become the basic guide on which the layout was later planned. A 'Design Selection Committee' was formed to select a suitable layout plan. A competition was held and the Society received thirty-two plans which were displayed for exhibition to the members of the Society on 17 and 18 December 1922. This was also visited on 17 December 1922 by the Governor, Sir Edward Maclagan.

The Designs Committee of The Society was not able to select any single plan. Consequently, The Committee shortlisted the following four plans (maps) which give interesting suggestions:

1. 'Dilnagar80' by Mr. G. K. Trilokekar, Architect, Bombay; 2. 'Commonsense' by Mr. S. C. Paul, Architect, Calcutta; 3. 'Jupiter' by Mr. N. L. Verma, Architect Allahabad; and 4. 'Dilemma' by Dr. J. B. Sahni Lahore.

The prize money was distributed evenly among these four competitors. The Design Committee then assigned Mr. N. L. Verma; one of the prize-winners to combine the ideas from these four shortlisted plans into one master plan (map). For this additional work he was awarded a further Rs. 500.

The final design was approved by the Government of Punjab.

=== Evacuee property ===
Model Town Club is a club for the residents similar to Lahore Gymkhana.

The Society was declared evacuee property after the Indo-Pak partition in 1947, as about 1100 out of 1300 members emigrated to India.

The case went to Chairman Rehabilitation Committee and they gave the historic decision in 1960 that the Society should pay Rs 100 and all assets and liabilities were shifted back to the Society. It was then placed under the management of Riaz-ud-Din Ahmad, agent to the custodian for Model Town. On 19 March 1962, 25 representatives of the Model Town Society held a meeting under the chairmanship of Khawaja Hafiz- ullah and discussed the legal status of the Society and further steps to be taken in connection with the reconstitution. As a result, the institution was registered as The Cooperative Model Town Society (1962) Limited, Lahore on 9 January 1963 by the Registrar, Cooperative Societies, Lahore Region. New bylaws of the society were registered under the Cooperative Societies Act 1925. The basic tenets of the society, however, continued to be the same as were originally planned, namely "to promote the economic and social interests of its members, particularly to plan, establish and maintain a garden town".

=== Administrator takeover ===
The Society, unfortunately, could not maintain its standards and the management staggered until April 1982 when the administrator was forced to take over the Society. The management of the Society was superseded under MLO No. 856, dated 30 March 1982. The general body and the managing committee were dissolved. All the powers and functions of the managing committee and general body were vested in the administrator. The legal status of the society continues to be a Cooperative Society registered under the Cooperative Societies Act 1925, supervised and controlled by the Registrar, Cooperatives Punjab, Lahore. please provide the copy of MLO No.856 dated 30-3-1982

=== Return of the elected managing committee and general body ===
After a lapse of twenty years, the Supreme Court of Pakistan restored the society in July 2002. Accordingly, elections were held in September 2002 under the supervision of the cooperative department. Members voted to elect a new management committee on 29 September 2002, which consisted of President Khalid Ikram Malik, Vice President Tahir A Khan, and 20 members of the Managing Committee (2 from each block) and five nominated / ex-officio members. This MC was dissolved by the Registrar within 18 months for incompetence. For two years again, the Administrator ruled the Society.

The first managing committee after restoration took over the office on 23 October 2002. This MC worked for 17 months only after which it was sacked by the Registrar for incompetence. In November 2005, on the orders of former Chief Minister Punjab, Chaudhry Pervaiz Elahi, new elections were ordered. Elections were held in Dec 2005, and retired Colonel Tahir H. Kardar was elected as President and took over the charge with Tahir A. Khan as Vice President. The new managing committee completed many projects and approved its first welfare-oriented budget for the fiscal year 2005–2006. Special attention was given to the development projects in the budget. An amount of Rs. 20 million was allocated for the construction of a Community Center which had remained on paper for many years. Similarly, 15 million were allocated for widening, re-paving and repairing the roads. In order to improve the water supply system, five new tube-wells were installed and rusted water pipelines were replaced. An amount of Rs. 10 million was allocated for this project. A new truck and 25 new transformers were purchased to upgrade the electricity system. Computerization of the office records was undertaken and more technical staff and professionals were recruited to improve efficiency.

The society's administration took up a number of steps for the welfare of the residents:

- Property cess was decreased from 3.5% to 2.5% of the registered value.
- Legal heirs were exempted from transfer fees and other liabilities.
- The electricity rates were subsidized and a relief of over 2.40 Rs. per kWh was given to the members as well as the work members.

== Area and population ==
Model Town Society is spread over an area of 5.9 km². This area is divided into ten blocks (A, B, C, D, E, F, G, H, J, K). Blocks L, M, N, P, Q, R and S are on the outskirts of Model Town and are administered by Lahore Development Authority (LDA). These blocks were named "Model Town Extension" when Model Town Society sold this land to LDA in return for developmental works.

The breakdown of the total area is as follows:

- Residential: 3.31 square kilometres (819 acres) = 56%
- Commercial: 0.12 square kilometres (29 acres) = 2%
- Roads: 1.13 square kilometres (278 acres) = 19%
- Nurseries and playgrounds: 0.24 square kilometres (59 acres) = 4%
- Green area (parks): 1.13 square kilometres (278 acres) = 19%

The total population of Model Town is about 100,000. Model Town Society is a unique housing area in its design and is considered a posh locality of the town. Each block has its own market, playground, mosque, triangular parks, etc., which is a rare phenomenon as compared to other housing schemes.

== Model Town then and now ==
Following the economic liberalization of Pakistan Model Town has benefited from the remarkable increment of social elites in Lahore. Not too long ago, Model Town was regarded as the establishment's residential dead zone.

Taxis and rickshaws were reluctant to come to Model Town due to its distance from the main city, and many social elites dubbed the development "out of Lahore", given its distance from the heart of the city. However, since the 1980s, Model Town has become a cultural center for Lahore's growing socioeconomic elite, many of whom view a Model Town address as a vehicle for upward mobility in socially rigid Pakistan.

During the regime of President General Zia-ul-Haq, General Jilani (then Martial Governor of the Punjab) took extensive interest in rehabilitating Model Town, which had fallen into obscurity following the exodus of Lahore's non-Muslim elites after partition. An initiative to refurbish the image of Model Town to its former glory in colonial days was launched in the early 1980s.

Electric supply lines were relaid, street lights & sewage system installed, roads improved, and central Model Town park was developed per the original plan from the 1920s. Further modernization, renovation of gardens and the influx of large numbers of upper and upper-middle class Lahoris helped redefine the rundown development's image and status.

Many architects, developers, and town planners regard Model Town as the best place to live in the entire city of Lahore. The ex-Prime Minister Nawaz Sharif maintains a home and holds an office in the society, while former Prime Minister Benazir Bhutto is said to have maintained a home here. Hamza Shahbaz Sharif, MNA and son of Chief Minister Punjab Shahbaz Sharif, and many other MNAs, MPAs and bureaucrats also reside in the area. Several national sports personalities like Wasim Akram, Rameez Raja, Ijaz Ahmed and Aisam-ul-Haq Qureshi live or used to live in Model Town. Other notable personalities who have lived in Model Town include the writer, intellectual and spiritualist Ashfaq Ahmed; left-wing intellectual and revolutionary poet Faiz Ahmad Faiz; intellectual and dramatist Naeem Tahir and his wife, broadcaster Yasmeen Tahir; legendary writer and first woman pilot Hijab Imtiaz Ali; Pakistani poet who wrote the lyrics for the national anthem of Pakistan, Abu Al-Asar Hafeez Jullundhri; secular journalist, syndicated columnist and political analyst Hassan Nisar; Pakistani educationist, entrepreneur and former Mayor (Nazim) of Lahore Mian Amer Mahmood; singer par excellence Malika Pukhraj; Pakistani musician and Qawwali singer, considered one of the greatest singers ever recorded, Nusrat Fateh Ali Khan; Urdu satirical and humor writer Mushtaq Ahmad Yusufi; and playwright, actor and professor Shoaib Hashmi, along with his wife, the artist, cultural writer, painter and eldest daughter of Faiz Ahmad Faiz, Salima Hashmi.

== Model Town Park ==
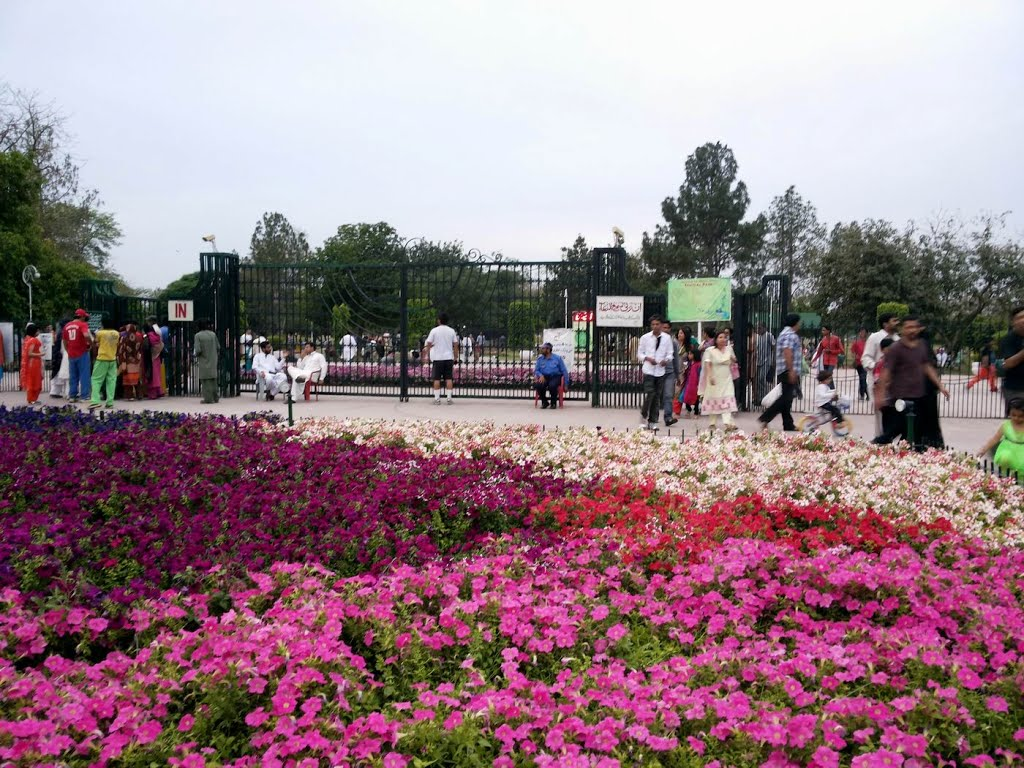
Model Town Park, Lahore

Model Town Park is one of the largest public parks of Lahore consisting of 0.51 square kilometres (125 acres) of land. It was part of the original plan but was developed in 1990 by Governor Punjab General Jilani. This circular park is surrounded by the inner circular road of Model Town. People from all surrounding towns visit Model Town Park, as it offers a 2.5 km long circular jogging track, lush green lawns and serves as a social meeting spot. Human Development Forum [www.hdfpakistan.org], a forum of intellectuals of Model Town, including Dr. Ahmad Saeed, Dr. Akhtar Jafri, Qazi Javed, Prof. Imtiaz Ahmad, Prof. Tanvir Sadiq and others, arranges lectures every Sunday morning in this park near the canteen on any topic related to public life. A large number of morning walkers attend these lectures, which is a tradition that has continued for many years without fail, regardless of the weather. There is a proper 'Walkers Group' who hold tea parties and dinners among themselves. They have even printed a directory of all these walkers with their residential addresses and telephone numbers.

It was declared the best park of 2007 in Lahore by the Forest Minister. About 5000 people daily visit this park. Recently a lot of development has taken place in this park, including a new rose garden, a Chambeli garden, and a families corner near the lake with new flower beds and swings for the children. An annual flower show started in 2008; prizes are given to the best houses (flower-wise), Malis, etc. Mayor Lahore, Mian Amir Mehmood gave away the prizes to the residents and staff in 2008 and 2009.

== Markets ==
In the heart of Model Town is the Bank Square Market and Central Commercial Market. The C-Block Market commonly known also as Bank Square Market is the busiest commercial area in Model Town, this market holds almost all the banks and eateries. Moreover, in this market you shall find pet shops and construction companies as well, Jadeed Engineering has lately opened its office in this market place which has diversified it even more. The beauty of Model Town is that every block has its own small market for grocers and bakers. The Model Town Link Road connects Model Town with Faisal Town and Township areas. On both sides of the road, there are shops for almost everything.

== Sports ==
Sports facilities in the area include Model Town Greens, Model Town Whites, Nawab Mansoor Academy, Model Town Club (home of renowned tennis player Aisam-ul-Haq Qureshi), Amir Mehmood's Club, and International Cricket Academy (LDA). Model Town also has its own Football Academy and Football Club, known popularly as Model Town Football Academy (or MTFA/MTFC). The Academy caters to all age-groups with a strict training regime. It is based at the D-block football ground. Another upcoming football club is the Fame Football Club, situated in B-block football ground.

== Library ==
It is located in F Block (31.4821°N 74.3220°E). It contains 40,000 books. Since it is a public library, membership is available at 511 Rupees. Separate reading halls for newspapers also exist. Loadshedding affects the daily routine. A Computer Lab also exists. The library remains closed annually for a month most often in September. As a library it is very important to the residents of Model Town Lahore. A proportion of the books are only used as a reference and cannot be issued. With the lending library only two books can be issued at a time. The condition of the library has deteriorated and needs urgent attention.

== Security ==
Model Town society ensured security for its residents by building barriers at each exit except the four main entrances. These barriers (gates) are closed after 21:00 and only four entrances (Ferozepur Road entrance, Link Road entrance, Mariyan entrance, and Arfa Karim Park entrance) are open 24 hours a day.

The crime rate has been minimized by this action. Now Model Town society also issues stickers for its residents' vehicles.

== Schools and colleges ==
- Govt. Shuhda-a-APS Model High School Model Town Lahore
- Quaid-e-Azam Law College
- Divisional Public School
- Model Town Library
- The City School
- Beaconhouse School System
- Lahore Grammar School
- Govt. College For Women
- Grand Charter School
