= Samanabad =

Residential neighbourhood in Lahore, Pakistan

Samanabad سمن آباد
- Union Council
- Interactive map of Samanabad سمن آباد
- Coordinates: 31°32′4.7220″N 74°17′38.6412″E
- Country: Pakistan
- Province: Punjab
- City: Lahore
- Tehsil: Lahore City

Government
  - Type: Union Council

A triangular monument built on the second roundabout of Samnabad.

Samanabad (Punjabi, Urdu: سمن آباد) is a residential neighborhood located in Lahore City Tehsil of Lahore, Punjab, Pakistan.

== Educational institutions ==
Samanabad is an important hub of educational activities. Many public and private sector colleges, as well as tuition centers, are located here. Important educational institutes of the public and private sector at Samanabad include:

- Government College for Women
- Government Central Model High School
- Government Islamia High School
- Government Girls Higher Secondary School
- Government Institute of Commerce
- Government Sulemania High School
- Government Junior Model School
- KIPS
- Lahore Grammar School
- The Educators
- The Lahore Lyceum
- American Lycetuff School System
- The Times College
- New Era Grammar School
- Central Group Of Colleges
- Hassan Memorial Science Academy
- Laraib National Academy
- Naveeed Majeed Academy
- Gracious Home Grammar School
- The Aquila School System
- U C Mas Education Group
- Unique High School and Unique Science Academy
- Fame Institute of Commerce and Science
- New World Academy
- Dar-e-Raza Islamic School & Academy

== Sports ==
Several sports facilities are provided to the residents in Samanabad. The most common sports played in Samanabad are cricket and football. Samanabad Sports Arena has been established which provides facilities such as badminton, gym, squash, table tennis, taekwando, aerobics and snooker to the members. There are playgrounds at different locations in Samanabad, where several tournaments of football and cricket are held.

== Sites of interest and importance ==
The Khizra Mosque in Samanabad, one of the oldest mosques of the locality.

The three most important main roads of Samanabad in terms of commercial activity include:

1. Main Boulevard Samanabad:

- Jamia Masjid Aqs-e-Jamil
- Automobile Market
- Rasheedia Masjid
- Main Market of Samanabad
- Bilal Masjid
- Sheikhoo Restaurant (among the more famous and old restaurants in the region)
- Sher-e-Rabbani Masjid
- KIMS Restaurant
- Tomb of Zeb-un-Nisa
- Bank branches of Habib Bank, Allied Bank, Bank Alfalah, Standard Chartered
- Cuisine specialities: Shawarma, Pathooray and Dahi Bhalle.
- Butt Sweets, Gourmet Bakers, Cakes and Bakes, Shezan Bakery, Bundu Khan Sweets
- Rizvi Market (commonly known as Old Video Market )

2. Poonch Road:

- Haree Kotheeian (meaning homes with green painted façades)
- Masjid Umer-e-Farooq (in front road of Haree Kotheeian you will see it almost in end of that road)
- Regional Office of NADRA (National Database and Registration Authority)
- Event and Marriage Halls
- Bank branches of Habib Metropolitan Bank, Summit Bank, National Bank of Pakistan, Bank of Punjab, Meezan Bank, Bank AL Habib, United Bank
- U C MAS.

3. Ghazali Road:

- Khizra Masjid
- Independent Health Club
- Ghousia Masjid (Near Doosra Gol Chakkar)
- Student Photo Copy & Stationers
- Union Council Office (UC-106)
- Bohr Wala Chowk (one of the oldest surviving trees of Lahore)
- Samanabad Sports Arena
- Doongi Ground
- Samanabad Post Office
- Amy's Bakers

Samanabad is also known for its roundabouts:

- 1st Roundabout (Pehla Gol Chakkar), seen while coming from Mor Samnabad, it is junction from Mor Samanabad and coming from Chuburji on Poonch Road
- 2nd Roundabout (Doosra Gol Chakkar), near Telephone Exchange & Mozang Meat Market
- 3rd Roundabout (Teesra Gol Chakkar), near Samanabad Girls College & Niazi Hospital
