= Faysal Bank =

Islamic bank based in Pakistan

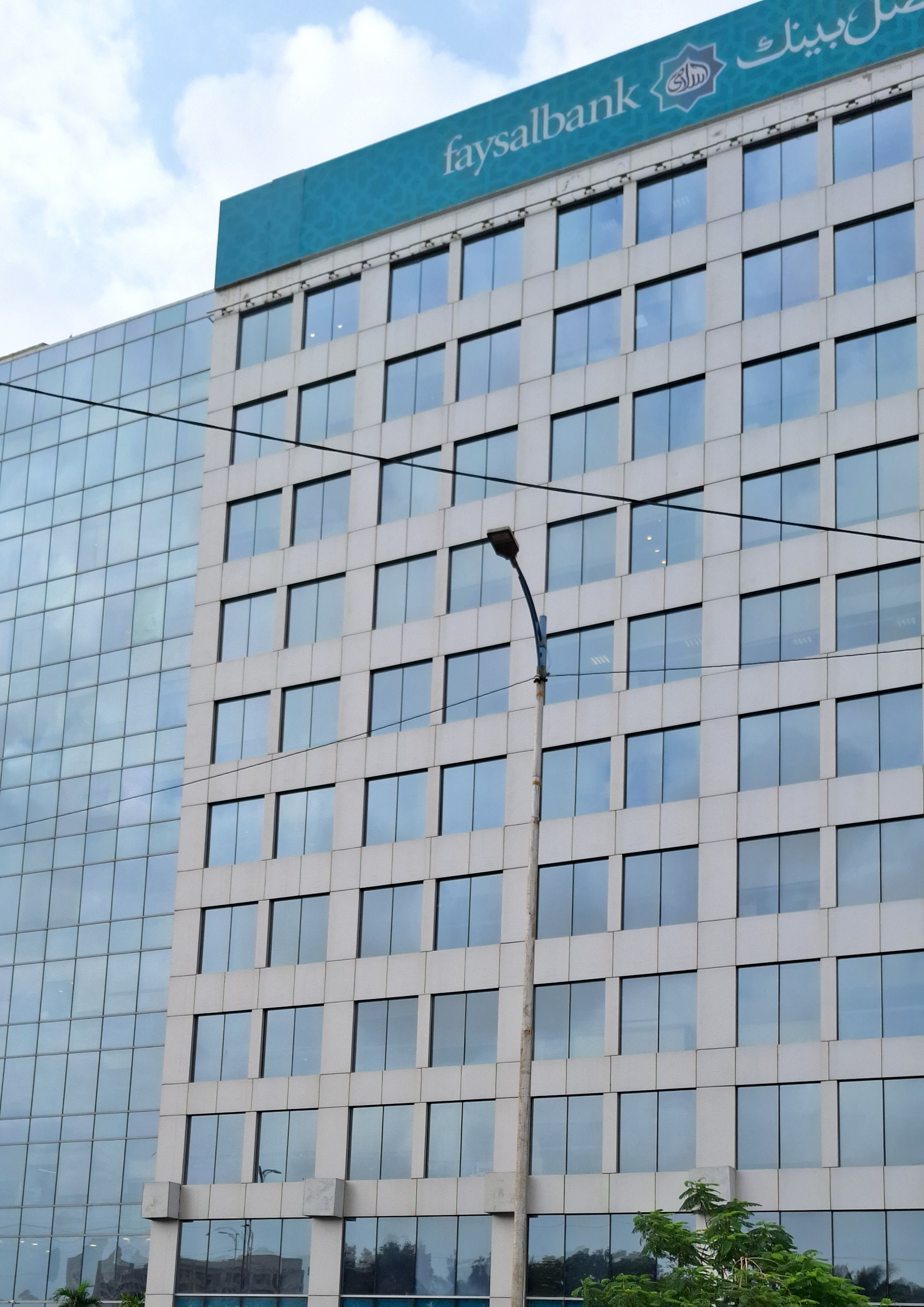
- Headquarters of Faysal Bank on Shahrah-e-Faisal in Karachi
- Native name: فیصل بینک
- Formerly: Al-Faysal Investment Bank
- Type: Public
- Traded as: PSX: FABL; KSE 100 component
- Industry: Islamic banking
- Founded: October 1987; 38 years ago
- Headquarters: Karachi, Pakistan
- Number of locations: 900 (2025)
- Key people: Yousaf Hussain (CEO); Mian Muhammad Younis (chairman)
- Products: Islamic banking, loans, consumer banking, business banking, priority banking, credit cards, debit cards, savings
- Revenue: ▲ Rs. 99.07 billion (US$350 million) (2025)
- Operating income: ▼ Rs. 47.04 billion (US$170 million) (2025)
- Net income: ▼ Rs. 21.70 billion (US$78 million) (2025)
- Total assets: ▲ Rs. 1.774 trillion (US$6.3 billion) (2025)
- Total equity: ▲ Rs. 98.28 billion (US$350 million) (2025)
- Owner: Ithmaar Bank (66.78%)
- Number of employees: 10,117 (2025)
- Parent: Ithmaar Bank
- Subsidiaries: Faysal Asset Management; Faysal Islami Currency Exchange
- Website: faysalbank.com
- Footnotes; Financials as of 31 December 2025

Faysal Bank Limited (Urdu pronunciation: [ˈfɛj.səl bɛŋk] FAY-sul-BANK) is a Pakistani Islamic bank based in Karachi. Founded as Al-Faysal Investment Bank in 1995, it became an Islamic bank in 2023. It is named after Mohammed bin Faisal Al Saud.

Over the years, Faysal Bank has been involved in multiple controversies. In the mid-2000s, the bank was embroiled in issues related to its capital markets operations, particularly involving its head of investment banking, Ajaz Rahim. Rahim was charged with insider trading by authorities in New York. In July 2020, it was fined Rs 96.1 million for violations in CDD, foreign exchange, KYC, and operations asset quality. More recently, in October 2022, the State Bank of Pakistan imposed a fine of Rs 10.025 million on Faysal Bank for violations related to regulatory and operational standards.

== History ==
=== 1987–2002: Beginnings as an investment and conventional bank ===
Faysal Bank started in Pakistan in October 1987, with a tiny branch and as a subsidiary of Faysal Islamic Bank, a Bahraini bank owned by Mohammed bin Faisal Al Saud, the son of the late King Faisal of Saudi Arabia. The bank was part of a broader initiative by the Dar al-Maal al-Islami Trust (DMI), a Geneva-based organization founded in 1981 to promote Islamic banking worldwide. Faysal Bank's operations in Pakistan consisted of the branch operations established in 1987 and Faisal Islamic Investment Bank, which was set up in 1996.

In 1995, the branches of Faysal Islamic Bank were incorporated as Al-Faysal Investment Bank, a conventional bank in Pakistan and it took over the six branches of Faysal Islamic Bank of Bahrain E.C in Pakistan. In the same year, it was listed on Karachi Stock Exchange.

=== 2002–2008: Merger, slow growth, and controversies ===
In 2002, the Islamic investment bank merged with the conventional bank, resulting in the loss of its Shariah-compliant status. This decision was driven by management choices rather than shareholder demands and led to a significant decline in deposits, from Rs31.9 billion in 2001 to Rs24 billion by the end of 2002, representing a 23 percent drop. Despite these setbacks, Faysal Bank managed to recover and even double its initial deposit base by the end of 2005. This recovery was largely attributed to deposits from Arab-owned businesses, particularly the Attock Group, which has a presence in Pakistan's oil industry. At one point, the Attock Group alone accounted for nearly a quarter of the bank's deposits.

In the mid-2000s, Faysal Bank faced additional challenges related to its involvement in capital markets and legal issues involving its head of investment banking, Ajaz Rahim, who was charged with insider trading in New York.

=== 2008–present: Acquisition of Royal Bank of Scotland Pakistan and conversion to Islamic banking ===
In March 2008, Faysal Bank appointed Naved A. Khan, a former banker at ABN Amro, as its new head. He was tasked by the board to restructure the bank's management. He implemented major changes, which included dismissing many existing staff members and hiring a large team from ABN Amro.

In 2010, under Khan's leadership, Faysal Bank acquired RBS Pakistan for £34 million, which had previously acquired the Pakistan operations of ABN Amro. Previously, ABN AMRO Bank Pakistan had acquired Prime Commercial Bank, consisting of 69 branches and spanning 24 cities in 2007 for US$227 million, which was merged into Faysal Bank after RBS Pakistan acquisition.

Nauman Ansari, who succeeded Naved Khan, focused on integrating the acquisition and streamlining the bank's operations. Ansari reduced the bank's workforce, which had grown significantly over the years. During Ansari's tenure, Faysal Bank shifted its focus on growth, which included converting more branches to Islamic banking in an effort to capitalize on the faster deposit growth associated with Islamic finance. The bank also expanded its branch network.

In 2014, it announced to convert itself into a full-fledged Islamic Bank in three to five years. It finally converted to a full-fledged Islamic bank by December 2022.
