= Nishter Tehsil =

Tehsil in Lahore, Punjab, Pakistan

Nishter Tehsil تحصیل نشتر
- Tehsil
- Country: Pakistan
- Province: (Punjab, Pakistan) Punjab
- District: Lahore
- Capital: Kahna Nau, Lahore
- Union councils: 40

Government
  - Type: Town Corporation
  - Mayor: N/A
  - Assistant Commissioner: Muhammad Saleem Aasi
- Time zone: UTC+5 (PST)
  - Summer (DST): UTC+6 (PDT)

Nishter Tehsil (Urdu, Punjabi: تحصیل نشتر) is a tehsil in Lahore, Punjab, Pakistan. It forms one of the 10 tehsils and municipalities of Lahore.
