= Lahore Cantonment Tehsil =

Pakistani administrative area

Lahore Cantonment Tehsil تحصیل لاہور کنٹونمنٹ تحصیل لہور کنٹونمنٹ
- Tehsil
- Country: Pakistan
- Province: (Punjab, Pakistan) Punjab
- District: Lahore

Population (2023)
  - Total: 1,860,427
- Time zone: UTC+5 (PST)
  - Summer (DST): UTC+6 (PDT)

Lahore Cantonment is a tehsil located in Lahore District, Punjab, Pakistan. The population is 1,860,427 according to the 2023 census. The seat of Government is located in the Cantt Kutchery. The main areas under the Tehsil include: DHA, Lahore Cantt., Walton Cantt., Bedian, Burki, Paragon.

== Demographics ==
According to the 2023 Census, 100% of the population was Urban.

=== Language ===
Population by Mother Tongue in Lahore Cantonment Tehsil
1. Punjabi (67.3%)
2. Urdu (25.2%)
3. Mewati (4.09%)
4. Pashto (1.61%)
5. Others (1.70%)

In the 2023 Census, Punjabi is the predominant first language, spoken by 67.35% of the population, followed by Urdu at 25.25%. and Mewati speakers constitute 4.09%.

== Settlements ==
- Lahore Cantonment
- Walton Cantonment
- Barki Road
- Bedian Road

== See also ==
- List of tehsils of Punjab, Pakistan
