= Township, Lahore =

Neighbourhood in Lahore

Township ٹاؤن شپ
- Neighbourhood
- Country: Pakistan
- Province: Punjab
- City: Lahore
- Tehsil: Model Town

Township (Punjabi, Urdu: ٹاؤن شپ) is a neighbourhood in Model Town Tehsil of Lahore, Punjab, Pakistan. Township is one of the largest residential neighbourhoods in Lahore, which was planned during the 1950s.

== Residential subdivisions ==
Subdivision	Sector	Blocks
Township A	A1; A2	A1 :: Government Employees Co-operative Housing Estate (Gech), A2:: Blocks 1,2,3,4,5,6
Township B	B1; B2	Blocks 1, 2, 3, 4, 5, 6, 7, 8, 9, 10, 11, 12, 13, 14, 15, 16
Township C	C1; C2	Blocks 1, 2, 3
Township D	D1; D2	Blocks 1, 2, 3, 4, 5

== Commercial areas ==
- Madina Market - Central commercial area of Township and a major commercial hub for southern Lahore.
- Ashiq Market - Situated on College Road.
- Mochi Pura
- Model Bazar - Situated on C 1 and C II sector
- Abu Bakar Road - with a collection of several food vendors and traders of household items.
- grocerex - Situated on Abu Bakar Road.

== Industrial regions ==
- Quaid-e-Azam Industrial Estate.
