= Islamnagar, Lahore =

Residential neighbourhood within Lahore Cantonment area, Punjab, Pakistan

Islamnagar اسلام نگر
- Neighbourhood
- Country: Pakistan
- Province: Punjab
- City: Lahore
- Tehsil: Lahor Cantt

Islamnagar (Punjabi, Urdu: اسلام نگر) is a neighbourhood located in Lahore Cantonment Tehsil of Lahore in Punjab, Pakistan. It is governed by the Lahore Cantonment Board.

== Landmarks ==
- Arfa Karim Software Technology Park
- Packages Mall
