= WAPDA Town =

Residential neighbourhood in Lahore, Pakistan

WAPDA Employees Cooperative Housing Society واپڈا ٹاؤن
- Housing Society
- WAPDA Town Society Office
- Nickname: WAPDA Town
- Country: Pakistan
- Province: Punjab
- City: Lahore
- Administrative town: WAPDA Town
- Union council: 257 (Wapda Town)
- Postal code: 54770

WAPDA Town (Urdu: واپڈا ٹاؤن, ) is a residential neighborhood located within union council 257 (Wapda Town) in Lahore, Punjab, Pakistan. It is considered one of the more upscale residential societies of Lahore.

== Location ==
Wapda Town is situated south of Johar Town and southwest of Township, with its primary entrance facing northeast of Shahrah Nazaria-e-Pakistan. Secondary entrance facing west of Khayaban-e-Jinnah.

== Subdivisions ==
WAPDA Town is divided into three Phases, which are further divided into blocks.

Subdivision	Blocks
WAPDA Phase I	D3,E2,E1,F2,D2,G3,G5,H1,H2,H3,H4,J1,J2,J3,K1,K2,K3
WAPDA Phase II	M,N1,N2,N3,P1,P2,P3,Q1
WAPDA (Ext)	B4

== Healthcare ==
The nearest major hospital is Evercare Hospital, it is the state of the art hospital with all indoor and outdoor facilities. Another hospital is Shaukat Khanum Memorial Cancer Hospital & Research Centre built by cricketer turned politician Imran Khan. Local clinics include:

- Health City Hospital
- Qasim Sindhu Hospital

== Education ==
Following schools are present mostly at Wapda Avenue or nearby:

- Soar Stem School
- Mazen School
- Beaconhouse School System
- Unique School
- Aurora School
- Meridian School
- Allied School
- The City School
- International School of Cordoba

and many others.

== Banks ==
Following banks branches are present at Wapda Avenue (Main Bulevard):

- Bankislami
- Faysal Bank
- MCB Bank
- UBL Bank
- Habib Bank Limited
- Allied Bank
- Bank of Punjab

== Commercial ==
Following businesses are present at Wapda Avenue (Main Bulevard):

- Euro Store
- Jalal Sons
- Cakes and Bakes
- Sialkot Sweets
- Aayris Global
- Bundu Khan
