= Allama Iqbal Town =

Residential neighbourhood locality in Lahore, Pakistan

Allama Iqbal Town علامہ اقبال ٹاؤن
- Residential area
- Location in Lahore Iqbal Town (Pakistan)
- Coordinates: 31°30′40″N 74°17′2″E
- Country: Pakistan
- Province: (Punjab, Pakistan) Punjab
- City: Lahore
- Tehsil: Iqbal

Government
- Time zone: UTC+5 (PST)
- Lahore GPO (54000): 54570
- Area code: 042

Allama Iqbal Town (Urdu: علامہ اقبال ٹاؤن), commonly known as Iqbal Town, is a commercial and residential locality in Iqbal Tehsil of south-western Lahore, in Punjab, Pakistan.

== History ==
It is named after Allama Muhammad Iqbal, the national poet of Pakistan. Development was started in the late 1970s and early 1980s. It was developed by Hassan Zaman Pvt Limited. It was previously famed for its name in Urdu, 'Sola Sau Acre سولہ سو ایکڑ' (meaning 1600 acres, a reference to the area it covers). Its boundaries are marked by Multan Road to the west and north, and by Wahdat Road to the south.

Iqbal Town has been home to famous actors and actresses of Pakistani film industry, Lollywood. Since the Shahnoor Studios and Bari studios are situated very close to the area, many film actors and actresses used to live here in the past. However, most of them have now moved to the posh suburban areas of the city.

Iqbal town's main boulevard is one of the busiest roads of Lahore. It also has a parking plaza at Moon Market. College block, Pak block, Asif Block, Kashmir block, Huma block and Jahanzeb block are situated on the main boulevard which starts from Multan Road (the intersection famously known as 'Scheme Moar'. Moar means corner in the Urdu language) and leads towards Wahdat Road and onwards to the Punjab University's New Campus.

Neighboring localities include Wahdat Colony, Ichhra, Samanabad, Garden Town, Mustafa Town, Sabzazar and Said Pur. Major commercial markets are Karim Block Market (adjacent to Umer Block and Karim Block) - famous for the garments shops located there) and Moon Market (Dubai Chowk).

The oldest open university in Pakistan Allama Iqbal Open University's Lahore campus is located in Raza Block of Allama Iqbal Town. It also houses the Karim Block Market nearby.

Allama Iqbal Town consists of a total of 22 residential divisions called 'blocks' listed alphabetically: Asif, Badr, Chenab, College, Gulshan, Huma,Hunza Jahanzeb, Khyber, Kamran, Karim, Kashmir, Mehran, Muslim, Nargis, Neelam, Nishtar, Nizam, Pak, Rachna, Raza, Ravi, Sikander, Sutlej, Umar and Zeenat.

== Gulshan-e-Iqbal Park ==
This park has been a source of entertainment in the area for almost three decades now. It was opened to general public in April, 1982. The park is known for its green gardens, enjoyment rides, food stalls, boating area, and an artificial waterfall and an artificial hill for one's climbing and hiking experience.

== Karim Block Market ==
The Karim Block Market is one of Lahore's busiest market areas and is situated along the Wahdat Road. The market comprises hundreds of retail and wholesale garment outlets, pharmacies, grocery stores, eateries and restaurants. There are also some petrol pumps, a Gourmet Bakery and branches of the Punjab Bank, MCB and Allied Bank, Meezan Bank, Bank of Khyber, Bank Alfalah, Faysal Bank, as well as IT Enabled businesses including Greenwich Bell within the premises of the Karim Block commercial zone. Karim Block Market houses many factory outlets including Levi's, Outfitters, Minnie and Minors, Shirt and Tie, Royal Tag. Many shops offer clothing for kids, men, and women at discounted rates round the year. This market caters the need of brand conscious people and low income, salaried people alike.
