= Kahna Nau =

Coordinates: 31°22′N 74°22′E

Kahna Nau is a town on Lahore–Kasur Road in Lahore District of Punjab, Pakistan. The population as of the 2017 census is 79,301. This town is named after the Hindu God Kahna, better known as Krishna. This town was named somewhen in pre-partition era.

== See also ==
- Kanhaiya Misl, Sikh confederacy, founded by a native of Kahna
