= Lahore Development Authority =

- لاہور ڈویلپمنٹ اتھارٹی

Agency overview
- Headquarters: LDA Headquarters, Johar Town, Lahore Pakistan
- Chairman responsible: Naeem -ul-Haq
- Parent agency: Government of Punjab
- Website: lda.gop.pk

Lahore Development Authority (LDA) is responsible for new planned development in Lahore, Pakistan. It also regulates and issues permits for new construction and housing projects, private houses, commercial development and remodels. It also controls zoning laws and manages Lahore's parks and green areas.

Its website states that it plans on making Lahore "one of the thirty leading educational, cultural, commercial, industrial, and information technology centres of the world by 2020".

== History ==
The Provincial Assembly of Punjab established the Lahore Development Authority under the LDA Act of 1975. It had previously been called the "Lahore Improvement Trust".

On 9 May 2013, five days after International Firefighters' Day, the LDA Plaza building in central Lahore caught fire, killing 25 people. The fire started on the seventh floor, and media coverage revealed people jumping out of the building to their death. The fire highlighted the irrelevance of fire safety regulations, considering the fact that the very agency whose responsibility it is to ensure compliance with fire safety regulation; the 35-year-old building's staircases were poorly designed and hampered rescue efforts. The fire was finally extinguished after 20 hours.

== Structure ==
It has three main wings:

- Urban Development Wing
- Water and Sanitation Agency (WASA)
- Traffic Engineering Planning Agency (TEPA)

The LDA Board of Governors is chaired by the Zila Nazim of the Lahore City District. Its members include the following:

- Director General of the Authority
- Town Nazims of all the Towns of Lahore City District
- District Coordination Officer of Lahore City District
- Representative of the Planning and Development Board Punjab not below the rank of Additional Secretary/Deputy Secretary
- Representative of the Finance Department not below the rank of Additional Secretary/Deputy Secretary
- Representative of the Housing Urban Development and Public Health Engineering Department not below the rank of Additional Secretary/Deputy Secretary
- Representative of the Local Government and Rural Development Department not below the rank of Additional Secretary/Deputy Secretary
- All the Heads of the Agencies established by the Authority (M.D. WASA & M.D. TEPA)

== Number of Employees ==
In Lahore Development Authority (U.D Wing), there are 1990 Employees in total out of which 567 have been declared as officers (Scale 16 & above) whereas 1423 fall under the category of officials (scale 1–15). There are 1622 pensioners in total. (As in November 2021).

== See also ==
- Government of Punjab, Pakistan
- LDA City
- Lahore Metrobus
- Walk and Shop Arena
