= Johar Town =

Residential town in Lahore, Pakistan

Johar Town جوہر ٹاؤن
- Neighbourhood
- Location within Punjab, Pakistan Location within Pakistan
- Coordinates: 32°20′N 74°21′E
- Country: Pakistan
- Province: Punjab
- City: Lahore
- Tehsil: Iqbal

Government
  - Type: Union Council

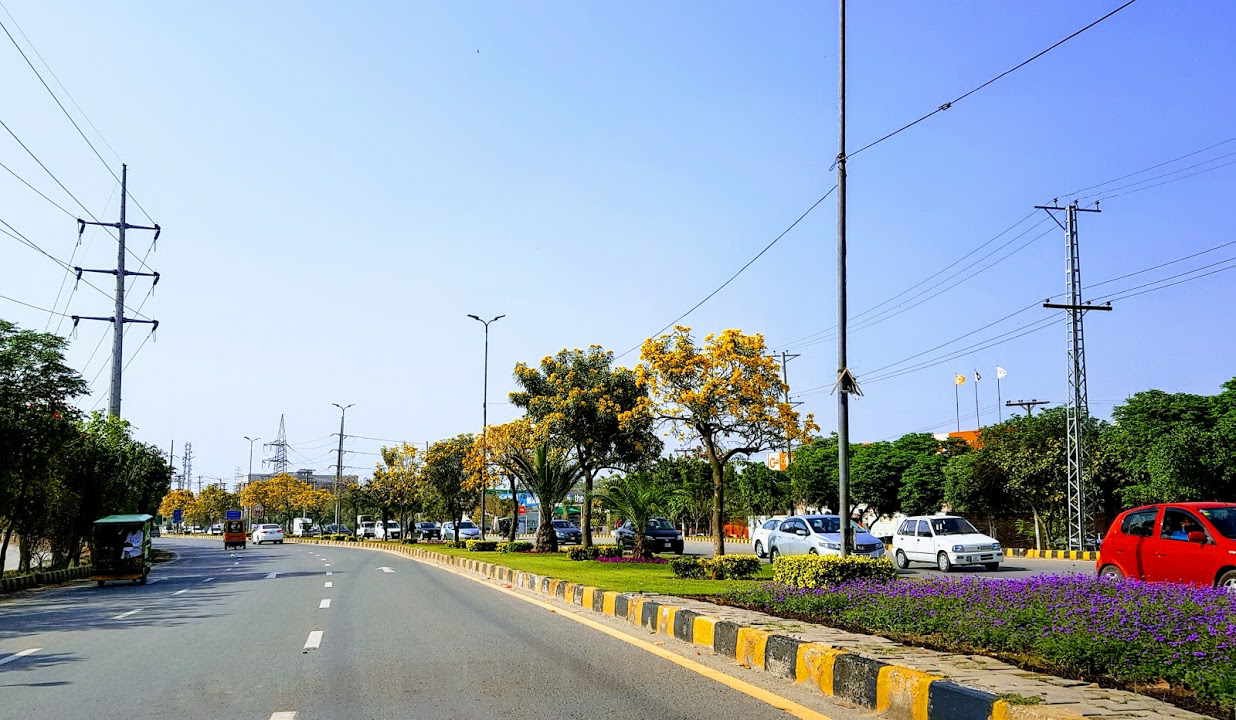
C Block, Phase I

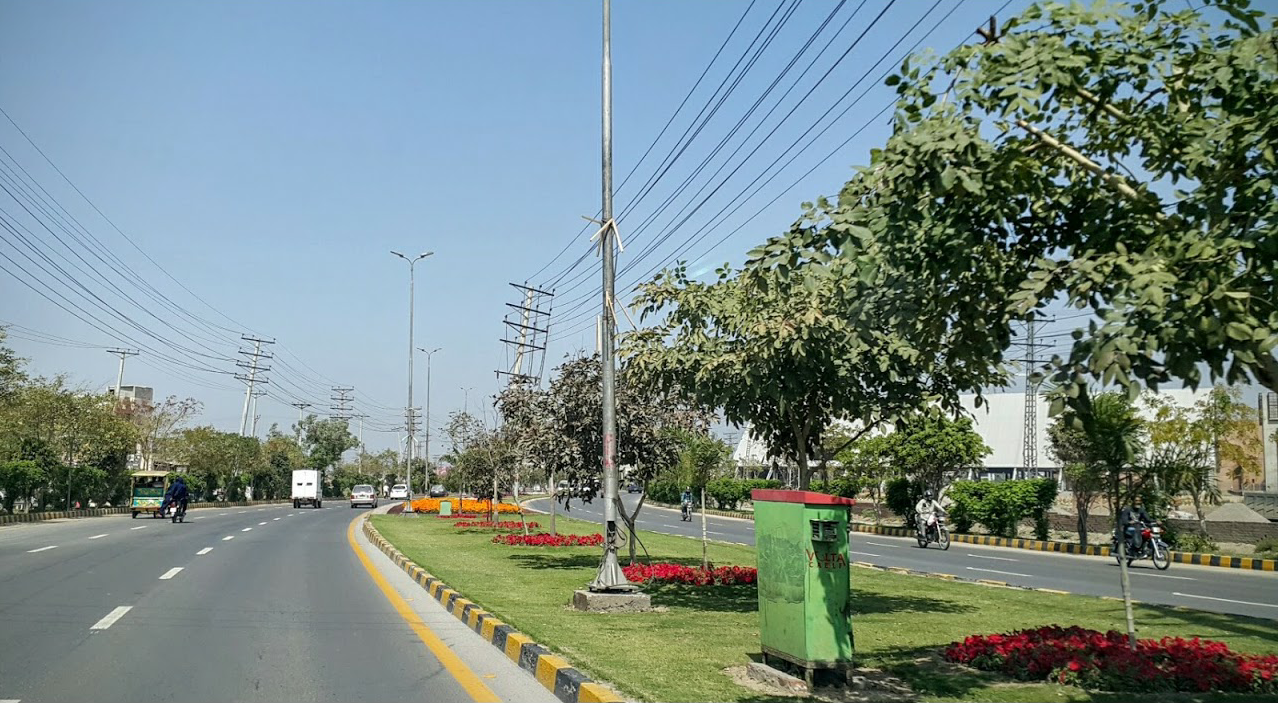
P Block, Phase II

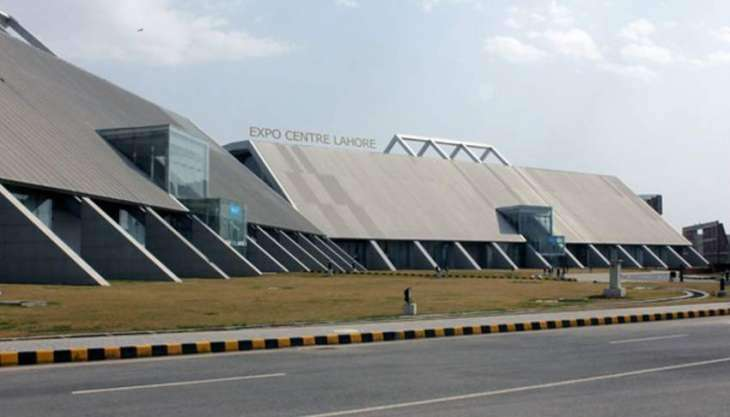
Lahore Expo Centre

Johar Town (Punjabi, Urdu: جوہر ٹاؤن) is a residential neighborhood located in Iqbal Tehsil of Lahore, Punjab, Pakistan.

Johar Town is named after Mohammad Ali Jouhar, one of several prominent leaders of the Khilafat Movement as well as of the Indian independence movement.

== Subdivisions ==
Subdivision	Blocks
Phase I	A - A1, A2, A3; B - B1, B2, B3; C - C1, C2; D - D1, D2; E - E1, E2; F - F1, F2; G - G1
Phase II	G - G2, G3, G4; H - H1, H2, H3; J.J1,J2,J3; K L M N P Q R - R1, R2, R3

== Attractions ==
- Lahore Expo Centre
- Emporium Mall

== Education and Health ==
There are lot of educational institutes and medical centers in Johar town.

- University of Central Punjab
- University of Management & Technology
- Punjab Group of Colleges
- Bahria University, Lahore Campus
- Lahore Grammar School, 4 Branches
- Bloomfield Hall School
- Musab School System
- Shaukat Khanum Memorial Cancer Hospital & Research Centre
- Bait-Ul-Ilm School
- International School of Choueifat
- Lahore College of Arts and Sciences
- School of International Studies in Sciences and Arts
- Latif Hospital
- Horizon Hospital
- Doctors Hospital
- Mughal Eye Hospital
- Pakistan Institute of Fashion and Design
- Beaconhouse School System, Johar Town (3 Branches)
- L’ecole Mondiale
