= Lahore Grammar School =

- مکتب گرامر لاہور
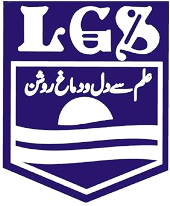
- Pakistan

Information
- School type: Private, Preparatory
- Motto: علم سے دل و دماغ روشن
- Established: 1979
- School board: CIE and Punjab Education Board
- Years offered: 1-13
- Average class size: 15–35
- Education system: GCE and SSE
- Language: English, Urdu
- Schedule: Day School
- Campuses: Johar Town, 55 Main, DHA Phase 1, DHA Phase 5, Model Town, 1A1, Paragon, State Life, Township, arwfala lgs, H-8, Islamabad
- Alumni name: Grammarian
- Website: lgs.edu.pk

Lahore Grammar School (LGS), established in 1979, is a private preparatory school in Pakistan affiliated with the Cambridge Board of International Examinations, with several branches throughout the country.

Lahore Grammar School has over 70 campuses spread out across Pakistan including Lahore, Islamabad and Faisalabad offering education from preschool to Matriculation and A Level.

== History ==
In 1978, the Pakistani Government announced that it would welcome initiatives in the educational sector. Taking advantage of this opportunity, a group of women from varied professional backgrounds and with the shared objective of contributing in this field decided to set up a girls school. In 1979, Lahore Grammar School was established when the 55 Main campus in Gulberg opened its doors to a handful of students.

The initial focus of LGS was the promotion of female education in Pakistan. However, it was soon realized that quality educational institutions were needed for young boys as well. This led to the opening of the Lahore Grammar School Johar Town boys' branch in 1992.

== Co-curricular activities ==
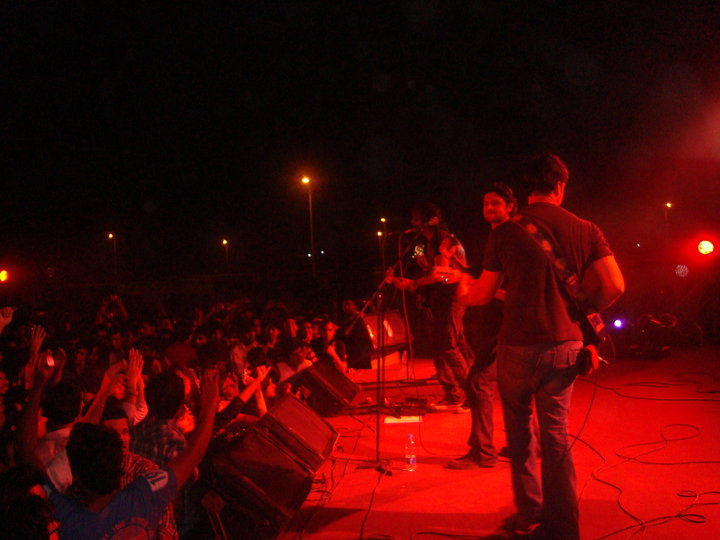
A concert organised by the students of Lahore Grammar School

School activities include plays, educational trips, community service, debating clubs, entering the International Schools Educational Olympiad and the LUMS Science Olympiad, and an environmental society.

== Controversy ==
=== Events ===
In June 2020, teachers working for LGS Gulberg had been accused of sexual misconduct by students.

Female students and alumni from LGS 1-A/1 (LGS Gulberg) exposed faculty members for inappropriate behaviour and sexual harassment publicly due to LGS's administration not taking appropriate action. Such behavior had been claimed to have been happening for many years. Four teachers were suspended.

Multiple other staff members, including the principal, were also suspended by LGS management following claims indicating they were suppressing complaints against misconduct, and slut-shaming the girls for their clothing.

== See also ==
- Army Burn Hall College
- Lawrence College, Murree
