= Model Town Tehsil =

Model Town Tehsil تحصیل ماڈل ٹاؤن
- Tehsil
- Country: Pakistan
- Province: (Punjab, Pakistan) Punjab
- District: Lahore

Population (2023)
  - Total: 3,244,906
- Time zone: UTC+5 (PST)
  - Summer (DST): UTC+6 (PDT)

Model Town is a tehsil located in Lahore District, Punjab, Pakistan. The population is 3,244,906 according to the 2023 census. The tehsil has an area of 353km². The population density is 9,192km².

== Demographics ==
Year	Population
1998	1,409,228
2017	2,712,398
2023	3,244,906
Population according Pakistan Bureau of Statistics.

== Settlements ==
- Model Town, Lahore
- Kahna Nau

== See also ==
- List of tehsils of Punjab, Pakistan
