= Khawaja (disambiguation) =

Khawaja is an honorific title of Persian origin used as a masculine given name and surname. It is used across the Middle East, South Asia, Southeast Asia, and Central Asia. Notable people with the name include:

== Given name ==
- Khawaja Ahmed (1920–1976), Bangladeshi politician and journalist
- Khawaja Riaz Ahmed, Pakistani football manager and sports organizer
- Khawaja Salah Ud Din Akbar, Pakistani politician
- Khawaja Akmal (1948–2017), Pakistani television actor and comedian
- Khawaja Asif (born 1949), Pakistani politician
- Khawaja Izharul Hassan (born 1971), Pakistani politician
- Khawaja Najmul Hassan (born 1949), Pakistani television producer and director
- Khawaja Iftikhar, Pakistani tennis player
- Khawaja Inaitullah (1899–??), Indian politician
- Khawaja Muhammad Islam (born 1953), Pakistani politician
- Khawaja Junaid (born 1966), Pakistani field hockey coach and player
- Khawaja Shamsuddin Khawafi (died 1600), Mughal official
- Khawaja Adil Maqbool (born 1988), Pakistani squash player
- Khawaja Muhammad Masum (1599–1668), Indian Sufi master and Islamic scholar
- Khawaja Sheraz Mehmood (born 1974), Pakistani politician
- Khawaja Khan Muhammad (1916–2010), Pakistani Islamic scholar
- Khawaja Nafay (born 2002), Pakistani cricketer
- Khawaja Imran Nazir (born 1974), Pakistani politician
- Khawaja Muhammad Nizam-ul-Mehmood (born 1975), Pakistani politician
- Khawaja Habibullah Nowshehri (1555–1617), Indian Sufi mystic, poet, and scholar
- Khawaja Pervaiz (1930–2011), Pakistani film composer, lyricist, and film songwriter
- Khawaja Saad Rafique (born 1962), Pakistani politician
- Khawaja Salman Rafique (born 1965), Pakistani politician
- Khawaja Tariq Rahim, Pakistani politician
- Khawaja Muhammad Safdar (1922–1991), Pakistani politician and diplomat
- Khawaja Shahudin (1867–1948), Pakistani Sufi poet
- Khawaja Muhammad Sharif (1949–2018), Pakistani judge
- Khawaja Muhammad Dawood Sulemani, Pakistani politician
- Khawaja Muhammad Taqi (1918–??), Pakistani field hockey player
- Khawaja Abdul Samad Wani (1935–2001), Indian journalist and politician
- Khawaja Muhammad Waseem (born 1969), Pakistani politician and businessman
- Khawaja Zakauddin (1936–2026), Pakistani field hockey player
- Khawaja Muhammad Zaman (1713–1775), Pakistani Sufi saint and poet

== Surname ==
- Allah Dino Khawaja (born 1965), Pakistani police officer
- Ataf Khawaja, Danish-Pakistani rap artist
- Faizan Khawaja (born 1986), Pakistani-American actor and producer
- Khalid Khawaja (1951–2010), Pakistani Air Force officer
- Momin Khawaja (born 1979), Canadian convicted terrorist
- Usman Khawaja (born 1986), Australian cricketer

== Other uses ==
- Khawaja and Son, a Pakistani TV comedy serial

== See also ==
- Khoja (disambiguation)
- Hoca, Turkish transliteration of Khawaja
- Hoxha (surname), Albanian surname, transliteration of Khawaja
