= Khoja =

Khoja may refer to:

- Khawaja or Khoja, an Islamic honorific title
- Khoja (name), a list of people with the name
- Khoja (community), a Nizari Isma'ili Shia social group or caste from Gujarat, India
- Khoja (Turkestan), term used for the descendants of the famous Central Asian Naqshbandi Sufi teacher, Ahmad Kasani
- Khoja, SBS Nagar, a village in Punjab, India
- Rashid al-Khoja (1884–1962), Ottoman and Iraqi politician in the Kingdom of Iraq

== See also ==
- Khoj (disambiguation)
- Khojki script, an Indic script used by the Khojas of India
- Khawaja (disambiguation)
