= Humayun Akhtar Khan =

Pakistani politician

- ہمایوں اختر خان
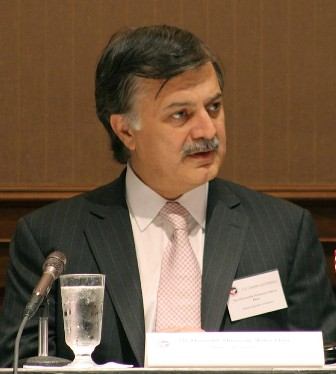

Federal Minister for Trade and Commerce
- In office 23 November 2002 – 15 November 2007
- Preceded by: Ishaq Dar
- Succeeded by: Shahid Khaqan Abbasi

Member of the National Assembly for Constituency NA-125 Lahore
- In office 23 November 2002 – 15 November 2007
- Preceded by: Mian Abdul Waheed
- Succeeded by: Khawaja Saad Rafique

Chairman Board of Investment / Minister of State for Investment
- In office 30 July 1997 – 12 October 1999
- Preceded by: Asif Ali Zardari
- Succeeded by: Abdul Hafeez Shaikh

Member of the National Assembly for Constituency NA-150 Rahimyar Khan
- In office 1 April 1997 – 12 October 1999
- Preceded by: Makhdoom Ahmed Mehmood
- Succeeded by: Jahangir Khan Tareen

Member of the National Assembly for Constituency NA-93 Lahore
- In office 19 October 1993 – 5 November 1996
- Preceded by: Aitzaz Ahsan
- Succeeded by: Mian Abdul Waheed

Member of the National Assembly for Constituency NA-92 Lahore
- In office 6 November 1990 – 18 July 1993
- Preceded by: Muhammad Hussain Ansari
- Succeeded by: Nawaz Sharif

Personal details
- Born: 1 April 1955 (age 71) Multan, Punjab, Pakistan
- Party: IPP (2023-present)
- Other political affiliations: PTI (2018-2023); PPML (2009-2018); PML(Q) (2001–2009); PMLN (1993-2001); IJI (1988-1993)
- Relatives: Akhtar Abdur Rehman (father); Haroon Akhtar Khan (brother); Sibtain Khan (wife’s uncle); Mir Shakil-ur-Rahman (son’s father-in-law); Jahangir Khan Tareen (cousin)
- Education: Government College University; University of Manitoba; University of Waterloo
- Occupation: Politician; Businessman; Actuary
- Website: www.humayunakhtarkhan.com

Humayun Akhtar Khan (Urdu: ہمایوں اختر خان) (born 1 April 1955) is a Pakistani politician, business tycoon and actuary. He has been elected as a member of the National Assembly four consecutive times between 1990 and 2007, having served as Federal Minister for Trade and Commerce from 2002 to 2007 and as Chairman Board of Investment / Minister of State for Investment from 1997 to 1999.

Khan is the Chairman of Akhtar Fuiou Technologies, an Agri-Fintech platform better known for its smartphone application DigiTT+, which is licensed by the State Bank of Pakistan as an Electronic Money Institution. He also owns Tandlianwala Sugar Mills and Lotte Akhtar Beverages (PepsiCo franchise).

== Early life and education ==
Humayun Akhtar Khan was born on 1 April 1955 in Multan to ex-DG ISI General Akhtar Abdur Rahman and Rashida Begum.

He received his early education from Army Burn Hall College, Abbottabad, and Saint Mary's Academy, Rawalpindi. He then received a bachelor's degree in business mathematics from Government College University, Lahore, and a master's degree in actuarial science and business administration from the University of Manitoba, Canada.

He is a Fellow of the Society of Actuaries, United States, since 1980 and of the Canadian Institute of Actuaries since 1981.

== Professional career ==
For around a decade while residing in Toronto, Canada, from 1977 to 1987, Khan worked in senior executive positions in leading multinational corporations and insurance companies including North American Life.

== Business career ==
=== Lotte Akhtar Beverages ===
Khan, along with his brothers, decided to move back to Pakistan in 1988 after the death of their father, General Akhtar Abdur Rahman, who died in a plane crash which also killed President Zia-ul-Haq. The Akhtar brothers, along with their cousin Jahangir Khan Tareen and his brother-in-law Makhdoom Ahmed Mehmood, together bought Riaz Bottlers (bottling and distribution franchise for PepsiCo beverages in Pakistan) from former Chief Minister of Punjab Sadiq Hussain Qureshi. The consortium managed to turn around the fortunes of Riaz Bottlers from bankruptcy to being the standout company in the beverage industry with key sponsorship deals including that with the Pakistan cricket team and a vast portfolio of the beverages that PepsiCo Pakistan produces such as Pepsi, Mountain Dew, 7-Up, Aquafina, Mirinda, Slice and Sting.

In 2018, South Korean chaebol Lotte Chilsung acquired a controlling stake in Riaz Bottlers (now known as Lotte Akhtar Beverages) although the Akhtar brothers maintain a significant minority share and are Lotte's strategic partners in Pakistan.

=== Tandlianwala Sugar Mills ===
After success in the beverage industry, the Akhtar brothers entered the Pakistan's sugar industry. They later expanded into production of downstream products such as carbon dioxide and ethanol. Tandlianwala Sugar Mills is the fourth largest producer of sugar in addition to being the largest exporter of ethanol in the country. As of 30 September 2023, it had Sales of Rs.42.3 billion.

The group includes three sugar mills in Tandlianwala, Muzaffargarh, and Dera Ismail Khan with a combined sugarcane crushing capacity of 48,000 tons of cane per day (480,000 metric tonnes of sugar per year); two ENA ethanol distilleries in Tandlianwala and Muzaffargarh with a production capacity of 265,000 liters of ethanol per day (66,000 metric tonnes of ethanol per year), and a carbon dioxide recovery plant with a capacity of 48 tons per day (annual production of 16,000 tonnes).

== Political career ==
=== Lahore Politics and Board of Investment (1990–1999) ===
Khan started his political journey in 1990 when he contested the elections representing Islami Jamhoori Ittehad (IJI) from NA-92 Lahore constituency (now NA-123), which was then considered a Pakistan Peoples Party stronghold. Khan won the election, beating PPP's Rafiq Ahmed Sheikh.

He became a member of Pakistan Muslim League (N) after it broke away from the IJI. In the 1993 general election, he contested for the National Assembly seat from the NA-93 Lahore constituency (now NA-121, which was then known as the 'Larkana of Lahore' as it was another PPP stronghold. He beat PPP's Aitzaz Ahsan, and was thus elected as a member of the National Assembly for a second time.

In the 1997 general election, despite being elected twice from PPP strongholds in Lahore and defeating PPP stalwarts in previous elections, he was not awarded a PML-N ticket. However, he was elected in the by-election on the Rahim Yar Khan MNA seat NA-150 (now NA-174) given up by his business partner Makhdoom Ahmed Mehmood. Upon being elected, he was appointed Chairman Board of Investment and Minister of State for Investment.

=== Musharraf Coup and PML-Q (1999–2002) ===
After the military coup in 1999 in which Nawaz Sharif was overthrown by General Pervez Musharraf, Humayun Akhtar, along with many of Nawaz Sharif's close aides, were under house arrest for months. For two years, the National Accountability Bureau launched thorough investigations against Humayun's family and placed him on the Exit Control List. After being cleared of all allegations leveled against him, Humayun resumed his political career in 2001.

In 2002, General Pervez Musharraf, who by then had also become the president of Pakistan, promised that there would be general elections in October. Because Nawaz Sharif had been exiled to Saudi Arabia and the military establishment gave the impression that he was gone for good, many of his most prominent party leaders, including Chaudhry Shujaat Hussain, Chaudhry Pervaiz Elahi, Ijaz-ul-Haq, Khurshid Mahmud Kasuri, Shaikh Rasheed Ahmad, Mian Azhar and Humayun Akhtar Khan, formed a new party called Pakistan Muslim League- Quaid-e-Azam. Humayun contested from constituency NA-125, which was in fact part of what was once called NA-93, the constituency he won from in 1993, and defeated Akram Zaki of PML-N and Naveed Chaudhry of PPP. He was one of only two PML-Q MNA candidates to be elected from the 13 seats in Lahore and was appointed Federal Minister for Trade and Commerce.

=== Commerce Ministry and Prime Ministerial Candidacy (2002–2007) ===
When PML-Q was forming its government in 2002, Humayun Akhtar was one of the candidates considered for the post of prime minister. However, President Musharraf and the PML-Q eventually decided to choose the prime minister from one of the smaller provinces and hence gave the honor to Zafarullah Khan Jamali of Balochistan.

By early 2004, it was clear that Jamali had fallen out of favor with President Musharraf and his own party members. Jamali did not support Musharraf's decision to keep on his uniform amongst other things while Musharraf was fed up with Jamali's incompetence and poor governance. By May 2004, the party decided to sack Jamali, and in his place, a number of potential candidates were listed. After many high-level consultations between the president and his close political and military aides, it was decided that Humayun was the best choice to lead the nation.

Although Humayun had a strong backing of the Pakistan Army and the ISI as many of the top generals had served under his father who led these institutions in the 1980s, his own party leaders the Chaudhrys of Gujrat proved to be the last hurdle in his nomination as they fought tooth and nail to ensure that he did not become the next prime minister. Party President Chaudhry Shujaat went to the extent of asking Musharraf to delay the announcement of the new prime minister by three weeks till the budget session concluded.

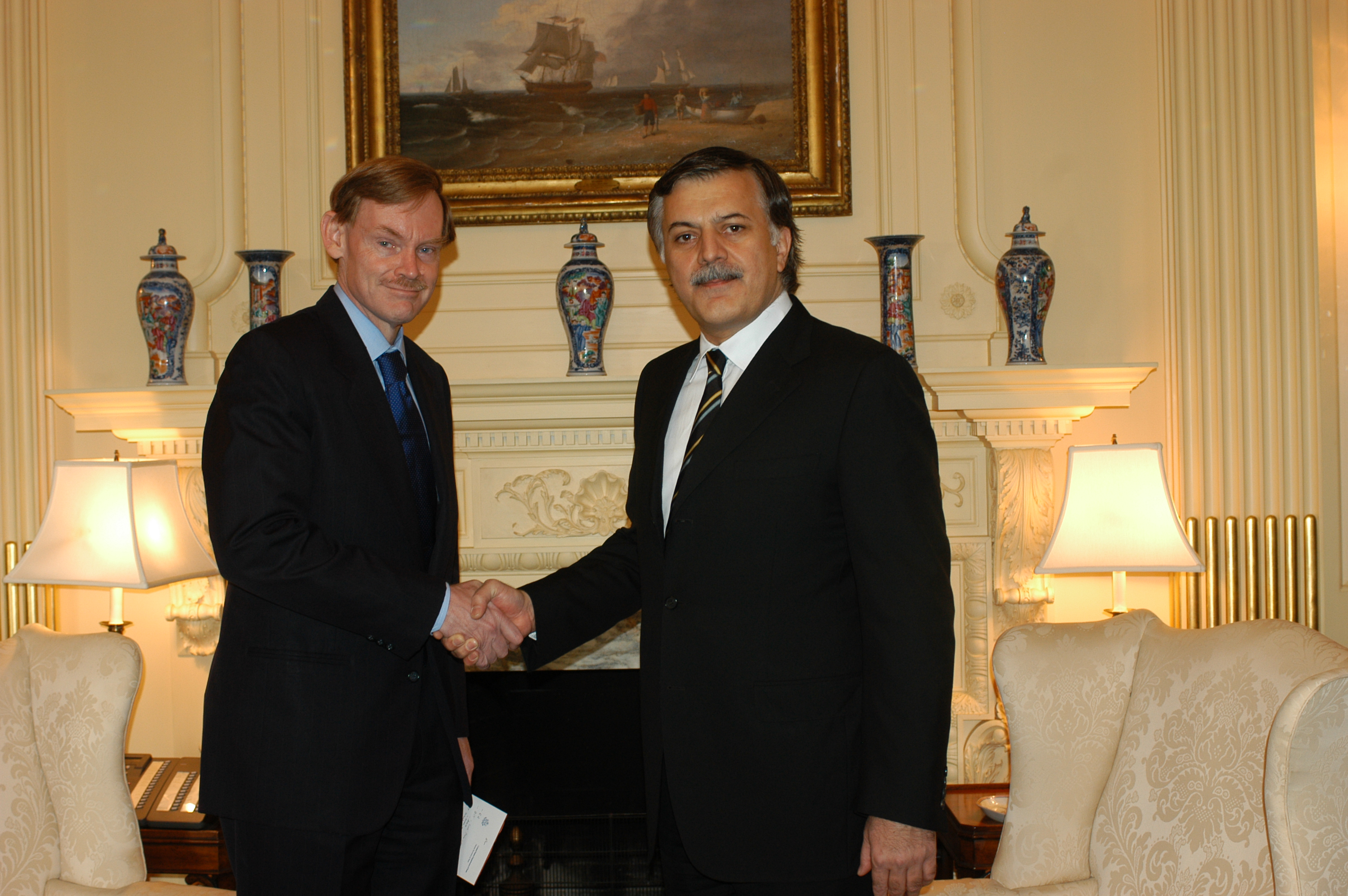
United States Deputy Secretary of State Robert Zoellick hosting meeting with Humayun Akhtar Khan, Pakistan's Minister of Commerce, on 28 November 2005

Many political analysts believe that the main reason behind the delay was to postpone Humayun's candidacy, as the Chaudhrys felt that he had intentions of hijacking the party from them and as a result threatening Pervaiz Elahi's own political ambitions of eventually becoming prime minister after the next election. Eventually, Musharraf adhered to the pressure and the only other viable option for Musharraf was Finance Minister Shaukat Aziz who was a senator, not a member of parliament. Eventually, Chaudhry Shujaat Hussain was made interim prime minister for two months and it was decided that Shaukat Aziz would contest an election for the national assembly via by-election. Shortly after contesting and winning the by-election, Shaukat Aziz replaced Chaudhry Shujaat as prime minister.

=== PML Likeminded Group (2008–2013) ===
In May 2012, the Pakistan Muslim League (Like-minded Group) formed an alliance with the PML-N in a bid to unite all Muslim League factions under the leadership of Nawaz Sharif, with the aim of defeating the PTI and the ruling coalition of PPP and PML-Q in the upcoming general elections. According to the seat adjustment formula that would accommodate several leaders of the Likeminded Group, Humayun was to be awarded a PML-N ticket from NA-124 Lahore instead of NA-125 while his brother Haroon Akhtar was to be awarded a PML-N senate seat in the 2015 senate elections. However, days before the election tickets were finalized, PML-N violated the agreement it signed in 2012 as Humayun did not receive a PML-N ticket from either of the two constituencies, although his brother Haroon was accommodated in June 2015 as a special assistant to the prime minister on revenue and was elected as a senator on a PML-N ticket in the 2018 Senate election. While Humayun stayed out of the public eye for the next five years, he spearheaded new joint ventures, mergers and acquisitions for his family businesses.

=== Pakistan Tehreek-e-Insaf (2018–2023) ===
In July 2018, Humayun Akhtar joined Pakistan Tehreek-e-Insaf. Having served as a member of the National Assembly several times from all of the areas comprising NA-131, he led PTI Chairman Imran Khan's campaign in the constituency and played an integral role in helping him defeat Khawaja Saad Rafique by a narrow margin of 680 votes. After Imran Khan decided to keep his MNA seat from Mianwali, Humayun Akhtar was declared PTI's candidate for the by-election from NA-131. In the by-election, he was defeated by Khawaja Saad Rafique, who received 60,476 votes compared to Akhtar's 51,329.

In June 2023, he announced that he quit PTI over the May 9 riots.

=== NA-97 Tandlianwala Tehsil (2024–present) ===
Humayun Akhtar took part in the 2024 general elections but this time contested from NA-97 Faisalabad-III Tandlianwala Tehsil, where he owns a sugar mill, ethanol distillery, and C02 plant, instead of from NA-122 Lahore-VI Lahore Cantonment Tehsil where he had been contesting from since 1993. He ultimately got 30,435 votes, losing to the PTI-backed independent candidate Saadullah Khan Baloch, who secured 72,614 votes. Despite his defeat, he is still politically active in development in the constituency.

== Personal life ==
Humayun Akhtar is the son of General Akhtar Abdur Rahman, who headed the ISI from 1979 to 1987, eventually going on to become the Chairman Joint Chiefs of Staff Committee of the Pakistan Armed Forces. He is the second of four brothers and is the older brother of Haroon Akhtar Khan who is currently serving as Special Assistant to the Prime Minister on Industries and Production.

He is married to his first cousin who is the niece of former speaker of the Punjab Assembly Sibtain Khan, and cousin of renowned politician and entrepreneur Jahangir Khan Tareen.

His son is married to the daughter of media mogul Mir Shakil-ur-Rahman.

== Writings ==
He has written columns and op-eds for different publications, including for the English-language daily newspaper The News International.

== See also ==
- List of University of Waterloo people
