= A Case of Exploding Mangoes =

2008 comic novel by Mohammed Hanif

- First edition (US)
- Author: Mohammed Hanif
- Language: English
- Genre: Historical fiction
- Published: 2008 (Knopf/US)
- Publication date: 20 May 2008
- Publication place: Pakistan
- Media type: Print (Hardcover)
- Pages: 336 pp
- ISBN: 0-307-26807-1
- OCLC: 191865420

A Case of Exploding Mangoes is a 2008 comic novel by the Pakistani writer Mohammed Hanif. It is based on the 1988 aircraft crash that killed Muhammad Zia-ul-Haq, the sixth president of Pakistan.

The book received generally positive reviews from critics. It won the Commonwealth Foundation's Best First Book prize in 2009, and was shortlisted for the Guardian First Book Award.

== Plot summary ==
The central theme of the book is a fictitious story behind the real-life aircraft crash which killed Muhammad Zia-ul-Haq, president of Pakistan from 1977 to 1988, about which there are many conspiracy theories. After witnessing a tank parade in Bahawalpur, Pakistan on August 17, 1988, Zia leaves the small Punjabi town in the C-130 Hercules aircraft designated "Pak One," along with several of his senior army officials, the US Ambassador to Pakistan Arnold Raphel, and some crates of mangoes. Shortly after a smooth takeoff, the control tower loses contact with the aircraft. Witnesses who saw the plane in the air later claim it was flying erratically, before nosediving and exploding on impact, killing all 31 on board. Zia had ruled Pakistan for 11 years prior to his death.

Lazy, irreverent Ali Shigri narrates the story. Ali's father, Col. Quli Shigri, has recently died in what was called a suicide, but Ali discovers that his father was killed by a rogue ISI officer, Major Kiyani, under Zia's orders. The story takes place in the months before the plane crash, jumping back and forth between Ali's revenge plans and his third-person observations of Zia's life. Ali attends the Pakistani Air Force Academy with his fellow cadets and their instructors. His best friend is Cadet "Baby O" Obaid, his roommate and close friend.

Interspersed between pieces of Ali's narrative are glimpses into the lives of other key Pakistani and American political players: Chief of Pakistani Intelligence General Akhtar Abdur Rahman, American ambassador to Pakistan Arnold Raphel, and President Zia ul-Haq himself. The book also touches on the perspectives of some of Zia's closest confidants.

Over the course of the book, Zia grows ever more suspicious of those in his inner circle until he is driven utterly mad by his own paranoia. Every morning, he asks his chief of security, "Who's trying to kill me?" A devout Muslim, he attends daily prayers, where he weeps loudly (an occurrence to which the other worshippers have become accustomed). He fights with his wife and takes every opportunity to leer at non-Muslim cleavage.

In one subplot, General Zia sentences Zainab, a blind woman, to death by stoning for being the victim of a gang rape. Being blind, she could not identify her attackers, so according to Zia’s sharia court, she has committed adultery. For condemning her, Zainab calls down a curse upon Zia. The curse is picked up by a sugar-obsessed crow. In another subplot, Arnold Raphel holds a Fourth of July party in Islamabad. A young, bearded Saudi known as "OBL" attends. OBL works for Laden and Co. Constructions, making this a clear reference to, and a cameo by, Osama bin Laden.

Ali's revenge plot consists of stabbing Zia in the eye with his under-officer sword, a move he practices daily in secret. But Baby O concocts a new plot to kill Zia by crashing a plane kamikaze-style down on him. He even goes so far as to steal a plane for the job, but in doing so, he accidentally lands Ali in prison at Lahore Fort, a torture center. While there, Ali listens to the screams of his tortured fellow prisoners and talks via a hole in the wall with the "Secretary General" who has been in solitary confinement there for nine years. Ali eventually learns that his own father is the one responsible for turning Lahore Fort into a torture center ("Nice work, Dad," he responds). Meanwhile, Major Kiyani appears on the scene, intending to torture Ali.

A sudden change in ISI command takes place, and Ali is freed in time to avoid torture. Upon his arrival back at the Pakistani Air Force Academy, he learns that he has been chosen as part of the squad that will perform a silent drill salute for Zia. Ali will finally have his opportunity, and he decides to stake his revenge plot on the use of snake venom from Uncle Starchy (launderer for PAF Academy), injected into Zia's hand via Ali's sword. After the silent drill salute, Zia boards the doomed Pak One.

The novel does not confirm whether or not Ali is successful in his attempt to assassinate General Zia. Rather, several alternatives are offered: the curse-carrying crow that crashed into the plane's engines while pursuing the mangoes, an explosive planted in the mangoes by the All Pakistan Sweepers Union in revenge for the death of their general-secretary at the hands of Major Kiyani, or one of Zia's confidants, each with their own secrets and motivations. The book even speculates that it could be the work of the CIA.

== Themes ==
=== Corruption ===
General Akhtar Abdul Rehman served as the ISI chief under General Zia ul-Haq, holding a senior position in the military hierarchy. The ISI oversaw the distribution of assets and weapons intended for the Afghan mujahideen. According to the book, a portion of these funds was diverted to influential individuals, including General Akhtar.

=== Global politics ===
The book explores the seemingly self-contradictory nature of American policy in the Middle East during this time. Much time is spent discussing the joint US-Pakistan effort to support Afghan mujahideen guerilla fighters against Soviet forces in the 1980s. Hanif writes, "Would-be supporters of the jihad against the Soviets were sent cards carrying a picture of a dead Afghan child (caption: Better dead than red)." Readers are reminded that the US enthusiastically collaborated with General Zia to finance, train, and supply the Afghan mujahideen in their insurgency. It was Zia who permitted the shipment of American arms and billions of American dollars to the rebels, and who allowed the border regions of Pakistan to be used as their haven and training base. Hanif highlights the irony in America wanting to purge the world of one type of authoritarianism by cultivating another. By propping up an unhinged dictator like Zia and conspiring with violent radicals, Hanif believes that the U.S. demonstrates that it will manipulate any weaker actor it can into being a pawn in their foreign policy strategy.

=== Islamism ===
Throughout the book, Zia remains convinced he is guided by Allah and feels he is receiving ominous messages straight out of the Quran predicting his demise. During his presidency Zia was credited for the Islamization of Pakistan. He was committed to enforcing his interpretation of Nizam-e-Mustafa ("Rule of the prophet" Muhammad), i.e. to establish an Islamic state and enforce sharia law. Hanif depicts this in a negative light to expose the hypocrisies he believes are present in political Islam.

== Characters ==
=== Fictitious characters ===
- Under Officer Ali Shigri – protagonist, leader of "Silent Drill Squad" at Pakistan Air Force Academy, Risalpur
- Major Kiyani – ISI officer who pushes Shigri to sign off that his father was a suicide (may be based on 2007-2013 Pakistan Army Chief Ashfaq Pervez Kayani, but not identical—as revealed at the novel's end) and transports Shigri between prisons
- "Secretary General" – prisoner in the cell next to Ali Shigri, who claims to have been the Secretary General of the All Pakistan Sweepers Union back in the beginning of Muhammad Zia-ul-Haq's era. His real name is never revealed.
- Under Officer Obaid "Baby O" – Shigri's roommate and close friend at Pakistan Air Force Academy, who develops the idea of crashing his plane into an area where Zia is present (in manner of Mathias Rust's flight into Moscow)
- Brigadier TM-Tahir Mirza – bears a slight resemblance to Tariq Mehmood. Dies in a televised parachuting accident.
- Lt. "Loot" Bannon – hash-smoking USAF instructor who develops "Silent Drill"
- "Uncle Starchy" – launderer for PAF Academy, who keeps jars of krait venom which he terms "death nectar"
- Zainab – blind rape-victim whom Zia sentences to death (through stoning) for adultery, and who curses Zia

=== Real people appearing as characters ===
- General Muhammad Zia-ul-Haq
- Zia's wife, Begum Shafiq Zia
- General Akhtar Abdur Rahman
- General Mirza Aslam Beg
- U.S. Ambassador to Pakistan Arnold Raphel
- Raphel's wife, diplomat Nancy Halliday Ely-Raphel
- CIA Near East & South Asia Division Chief Charles Cogan
- Osama bin Laden
- Romanian dictator Nicolae Ceaușescu
- U.S. political activist Joanne Herring

== Reception ==
The Guardian described the novel as "woven in language as explosive as the mangoes themselves, is wickedly cynical and reveals layers of outrageous – and plausible – corruption." The New York Times, in a review, called the novel "eerie timeliness". The Washington Post concluded its review by attesting that "Hanif has his own story to tell, one that defies expectations at every turn."

== Awards and nominations ==
- Winner of the 2009 Commonwealth Book Prize in the Best First Book category.
- Winner of the 2008 Shakti Bhatt First Book Prize.
- Shortlisted for the 2008 Guardian First Book Award.
- Longlisted for the 2008 Man Booker Prize.
