= NA-123 Lahore-VII =

Constituency of the National Assembly of Pakistan

- Constituency for the National Assembly of Pakistan
- Region: Lahore City and Lahore Cantonment areas of Lahore District
- Electorate: 338,780

Current constituency
- Created: 2018
- Party: Pakistan Muslim League (N)
- Member: Shehbaz Sharif
- Created from: NA-125 Lahore-VIII

NA-123 Lahore-VII ( این اے-123، لاہور-7) is a newly created constituency for the National Assembly of Pakistan. It mainly comprises the Walton Cantonment.

== Members of Parliament ==
=== 2018–2023: NA-132 Lahore-X ===
Election	Member	Party
2018	Shehbaz Sharif	PML(N)

=== 2024–present: NA-123 Lahore-VII ===
Election	Member	Party
2024	Shehbaz Sharif	PML(N)

== Election 2018 ==
General elections were held on 25 July 2018.

General election 2018: NA-132 Lahore-X
Party	Candidate	Votes	%
PML(N)	Shehbaz Sharif	95,834	51.26
PTI	Ch Muhammad Mansha Sindhu	49,093	26.26
PPP	Samina Khalid Ghurki	24,420	13.06
Others	Others (twelve candidates)	17,622	9.42
Turnout		190,493	60.45
Total valid votes		186,969	98.15
Rejected ballots		3,524	1.85
Majority		46,741	25.00
Registered electors		315,104	
PML(N) win (new seat)			

== Election 2024 ==
General elections were held on 8 February 2024. Shehbaz Sharif won the election with 63,953 votes.

General election 2024: NA-123 Lahore-VII
Party	Candidate	Votes	%	±%
PML(N)	Shehbaz Sharif	63,953	41.09	▼10.17
PTI	Afzal Azeem Pahat (Note: Filed nomination papers as PTI candidate but ECP allowed him to run as an Independent)	48,489	31.15	▲4.89
TLP	Amjad Naeem	20,160	12.95	▲9.04
Others	Others (twelve candidates)	23,047	14.81	
Turnout		159,494	47.08	▼13.37
Total valid votes		155,649	97.59	
Rejected ballots		3,845	2.41	
Majority		15,464	9.94	▼15.06
Registered electors		338,780		
PML(N) hold				

== See also ==
- NA-122 Lahore-VI
- NA-124 Lahore-VIII
