= Battle of Kaiser-e-Hind Fortress =

Battle of the Indo-Pakistani War of 1971

Battle of Qaisar-i-Hind
- Part of the Indo-Pakistani War of 1971
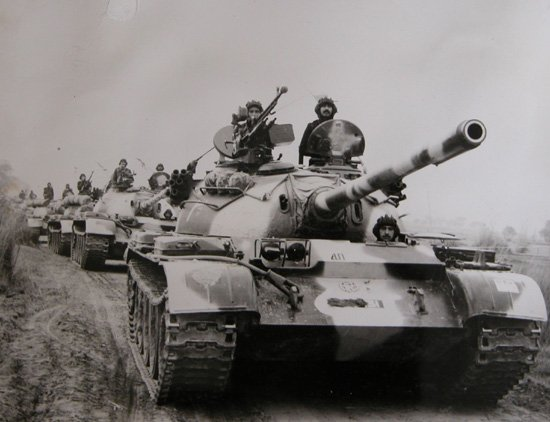
- Pakistani T-59 tank column during the Western front of the Indo-Pakistani war of 1971
Date	3–4 December 1971
Location	Punjab, India
Result	Pakistani victory: Capture of Qaser-i-Hind citadel

Belligerents
Pakistan	India

Commanders and leaders
(Pakistan) Lt. Col. Habib Ahmed, Baloch (Pakistan) Lt. Col. Asif khursheed, Artillery (Pakistan) Maj. Gen. Akhtar Abdur Rahman	(India) Unknown

Units involved
(Pakistan) 41 Baloch (Pakistan) 45 Field Artillery	(India) 15 Punjab and other units (India) Indian Air Force

Strength
1,400	2,300

Casualties and losses
67 killed 120 wounded	125 killed 238 wounded Dozens of weapons captured

Kaser-e-Hind or Qaser-i-Hind is a citadel in the Indian state of Punjab. The fortress was briefly occupied by Pakistani military and was later returned to India after the end of 1971 India-Pakistan War. 41 Baloch Regiment and 45 Field Regiment Pakistan Artillery were awarded battle honours for their tremendous and bold victory over the citadel.

== The battle ==
On 3 December 1971, a unit of 41st Baloch under the command of Lt. Colonel Habib Ahmed launched an attack to capture the Qaiser-i-Hind fortress and the perimeter in the Hussainiwala sector. The unit of 41st Baloch was supported by 45 Field Regiment commanded by Lt. Colonel Asif under the control of Major General Akhtar Abdur Rahman. The fierce battle involved usage of heavy artillery and tanks by both sides. After initial resistance faced by Pakistani troops, Gunners of 45 Field Regiment Artillery from Pakistan side wreaked havoc on the citadel through direct shootings by bringing the guns forward. The Indian Air Force was also used to attack the advancing Pakistani troops. However, due to resolve of Pakistani forces, by the night of 4 December 1971, the Indian troops eventually withdrew from the area. Qaiser-i-Hind citadel and Hussainiwala remained under the control Pakistani troops throughout the war. Following the end of 1971 war, the occupied territory was returned to India.

== Casualties and losses ==
67 Pakistanis were killed (including 1 officer) and 120 were wounded in the battle for the fortress, while Indian losses were around 125 killed, 238 wounded, as well as a large cache of weaponry captured by Pakistan.

== Gallantry ==
Many officers and soldiers of 41st Baloch and 45 Field were awarded medals for displaying act of bravery and courage throughout the conflict. 41 Baloch regiment and 45 Field Artillery Regiment both earned the title of "Fateh Qasar-e-Hind" for their performance during the capture of Qaiser-i-Hind. Lieutenant Afzal Nawaz from 45 Field Regiment Artillery was posthumously awarded Sitara-e-Jurat, Pakistan's third-highest gallantry award, for exhibiting exceptional bravery during his role as observer.

== See also ==
- Battle of Chumb (1971)
- Battle of Hussainiwala
