= PP-151 Lahore-VII =

Constituency of the Provincial Assembly of Punjab, Pakistan

- Constituency for the Provincial Assembly of Punjab
- Region: Lahore City and Wagha in Lahore District

Current constituency
- Created from: PP-157 Lahore-XXI (2002-2018); PP-150 Lahore-VII (2018-2023)

PP-151 Lahore-VII (پی پی-151، لاہور-7) is a Constituency of Provincial Assembly of Punjab.

== General elections 2024 ==
Provincial election 2024: PP-151 Lahore-VII
Party	Candidate	Votes	%	±%
PML(N)	Sohail Shoukat Butt	90,236	55.02	
Independent	Hammad Ali (Note: Filed nomination papers as PTI candidate but ECP allowed him to run as an Independent)	15,844	22.80	
TLP	Khalil Ahmad	11,642	16.75	
Others	Others (fifteen candidates)	3,776	5.43	
Turnout		70,794	41.95	
Total valid votes		69,498	98.17	
Rejected ballots		1,296	1.83	
Majority		22,392	32.22	
Registered electors		168,754		
hold				

== General elections 2018 ==
General elections were held on 25 July 2018.

Provincial election 2018: PP-150 Lahore-VII
Party	Candidate	Votes	%	±%
PML(N)	Bilal Yaseen	56,038	51.97	
PTI	Chaudhary Muhammad Asghar	37,316	34.61	
TLP	Muhammad Amir	8,227	7.63	
AAT	Muhammad Amir	1,830	1.70	
PPP	Chaudhary Muhammad Mansha Prince	1,722	1.60	
MMA	Jabran Bin Salman	1,571	1.46	
Others	Others (nine candidates)	1,124	1.03	
Turnout		109,126	51.90	
Total valid votes		107,828	98.81	
Rejected ballots		1,298	1.19	
Majority		18,722	17.36	
Registered electors		210,257		
hold				

== General elections 2013 ==
General elections were held on 11 May 2013. Muhammad Tajammal Hussain won by 45, 953 votes.

Provincial election 2013: PP-157 Lahore-XXI
Party	Candidate	Votes	%	±%
PML(N)	Muhammad Tajammal Hussain	45,947	52.13	
PTI	Hamid Sarwar	20,721	23.51	
PPP	Babar Sohail Butt Lakhodair	13,237	15.02	
JI	Mian Muhammad Amir Khalil	4,683	5.31	
Independent	Ch. Muhammad Sarfaraz Manawan	2,539	2.88	
Others	Others (twenty candidates)	1,006	1.14	
Turnout		89,931	51.48	
Total valid votes		88,133	98.00	
Rejected ballots		1,798	2.00	
Majority		25,226	28.62	
Registered electors		174,680		
hold				

== General elections 2008 ==
General elections were held on 18 Feb 2008. Rana Tajamul Hussain won by 27, 318 votes.

== General elections 2002 ==
General elections were held on 10 Oct 2002.Naveed Ashiq Diyal won the seat of MPA.

== See also ==
- PP-150 Lahore-VI
- PP-152 Lahore-VIII
