= Khawaja Salman Rafique =

Pakistani politician

Minister for Specialized Healthcare & Medical Education
- Incumbent
- Assumed office 6 March 2024
- Chief Minister: Maryam Nawaz
- In office 28 November 2016 – 31 May 2018
- Chief Minister: Shehbaz Sharif

Provincial Minister of Health
- In office April 2022 – July 2022
- Chief Minister: Hamza Shahbaz

Advisor to the Chief Minister for Health
- In office 13 November 2013 – 26 November 2016
- Chief Minister: Shehbaz Sharif

Special Assistant to Chief Minister for Health
- In office 8 February 2012 – 20 March 2013
- Chief Minister: Shehbaz Sharif

Member of the Provincial Assembly of the Punjab
- Incumbent
- Assumed office 24 February 2024
- Constituency: PP-153 Lahore-IX
- In office 15 August 2018 – 14 January 2023
- Constituency: PP-157 Lahore-XIV
- In office 2 September 2013 – 31 May 2018
- Constituency: PP-142 (Lahore-VI)
- In office 9 April 2008 – 20 March 2013
- Constituency: PP-142 (Lahore-VI)

Personal details
- Born: 16 February 1965 (age 61) Lahore, Punjab, Pakistan
- Party: PMLN (2008-present)
- Relations: Khawaja Saad Rafique (brother); Ghazala Saad Rafique (sister-in-law)
- Parent: Begum Farhat Rafique (mother)

Khawaja Salman Rafique (Punjabi: خواجا سلمان رفیق) is a Pakistani politician who is currently serving as Minister of Specialized Health in Chief Minister Maryam Nawaz's cabinet. He has previously served in Chief Minister Shehbaz Sharif cabinet as Minister for Specialized Health and he also has served as Advisor and Special Assistant for Health. He is a member of the Provincial Assembly of the Punjab since 2024 and was before that from April 2008 to March 2013, from September 2013 to May 2018 and from August 2018 to January 2023. He also served as Minister in Chief Minister Hamza Shahbaz Cabinet. He was one of the main key figures in handling dengue in 2010.

== Early life and family ==
He was born on 16 February 1965.

He earned his BE degree in Mechanical Engineering from the University of Engineering & Technology, Lahore in 1990.

He is the younger brother of Khawaja Saad Rafique. His father Khawaja Muhammad Rafique was a politician, a Pakistan Movement activist and later an opposition leader to PM Zulfikar Ali Bhutto. He was murdered in 1972 and the family blamed Bhutto. His mother Begum Farhat Rafique was also elected member of Provincial Assembly of Punjab in 1985.

== Political career ==
He was elected to the Provincial Assembly of the Punjab as a candidate of Pakistan Muslim League (N) (PML-N) from Constituency PP-142 (Lahore-VI) in 2008 Pakistani general election. He served as Special Assistant to Chief Minister of Punjab on Health.

He was re-elected to the Provincial Assembly of the Punjab as a candidate of PML-N from Constituency PP-142 (Lahore-VI) in by-elections held in August 2013. In November 2013, he briefly served as Special Assistant to Chief Minister of Punjab on Health. In November 2016, he was inducted into the provincial cabinet of Chief Minister Shahbaz Sharif and was made Provincial Minister of Punjab for Specialized Healthcare and Medical Education.

He was re-elected to Provincial Assembly of the Punjab as a candidate of PML-N from Constituency PP-157 (Lahore-XIV) in 2018 Pakistani general election.

He was officially elected from the Punjab Assembly seat PP-153 Lahore-IX in the 2024 Punjab provincial election as a PML-N candidate. Following this he was chosen as Provincial Minister of Punjab for Specialized Healthcare and Medical Education for the second time, this time in the Maryam ministry. He was also handed the additional portfolio of the Punjab Emergency Services.
