= Constituency NA-125 =

Former constituency of the National Assembly of Pakistan

Constituency NA-125 (Lahore-VIII)
- Former constituency for the National Assembly of Pakistan
- Region: Lahore District

Former constituency
- Created: 2002
- Abolished: 2018
- Number of members: 1

Constituency NA-125 (Lahore-VIII) (Urdu: این اے-۱۲۵، لاهور-۸) was a constituency for the National Assembly of Pakistan. After the 2018 delimitations, its areas have been divided among NA-131 (Lahore-IX), NA-132 (Lahore-X), and NA-134 (Lahore-XII).

== Boundaries ==
The constituency included DHA and Cantonment, the most affluent areas of Lahore. It also had a considerable population from adjoining villages on Badian Road.

After the 2018 delimitations, its areas have been divided among NA-131 (Walton Cantonment), NA-132 (Rural part around Bedian Road), and NA-134 (the vicinity of Church Road).

== Election 2002 ==
General elections were held on 10 Oct 2002. Humayun Akhtar Khan of PML Q won by 22,405 votes.

General election 2002: NA-125 Lahore-VIII
Party	Candidate	Votes	%	±%
PML(Q)	Hamayun Akhtar Khan	22,405	29.64	
PML(N)	Muhammad Akram Zaki	21,186	28.03	
PPP	Muahmmad Naveed Ch.	21,152	27.98	
PTI	Syed Shahid Zulfiqar Ali	6,343	8.39	
Others	Others (nine candidates)	4,507	5.96	
Turnout		76,713	30.05	
Total valid votes		75,593	98.54	
Rejected ballots		1,120	1.46	
Majority		1,219	1.61	
Registered electors		255,313		

== Election 2008 ==
General elections were held on 18 Feb 2008. Khawaja Saad Rafique succeeded in the election with 70,752 votes and became the member of National Assembly.

General election 2008: NA-125 Lahore-VIII
Party	Candidate	Votes	%	±%
PML(N)	Khawaja Saad Rafique	70,752	64.18	
PPP	Muhammad Naveed Ch.	24,592	22.31	
PML(Q)	Humayun Akhtar Khan	13,702	12.43	
Others	Others (eight candidates)	1,200	1.08	
Turnout		111,707	35.86	
Total valid votes		110,246	98.69	
Rejected ballots		1,461	1.31	
Majority		46,160	41.87	
Registered electors		311,540		

== Election 2013 ==
General elections were held on 11 May 2013. Khawaja Saad Rafique of PML-N won by 123,416 votes and became the member of National Assembly.

General election 2013: NA-125 Lahore-VIII
Party	Candidate	Votes	%	±%
PML(N)	Khawaja Saad Rafique	123,416	55.55	
PTI	Hamid Khan	84,495	38.03	
PPP	Muhammad Naveed Ch.	6,152	2.77	
Independent	Hakim Ali Bhatti	2,869	1.29	
Others	Others (fifteen candidates)	5,229	2.36	
Turnout		226,360	52.71	
Total valid votes		222,161	98.15	
Rejected ballots		4,199	1.85	
Majority		38,921	17.52	
Registered electors		429,485		

== Allegations of Rigging in Election 2013 ==
When the constituency was examined by the NADRA on 14 December 2014, they concluded that more than 20% of the votes could not be verified. The said votes were rejected for want of verification of thumbprint and CNIC numbers. The report alleged that in some instances, one person had cast multiple votes. A re-election was ordered by the election tribunal and the Election Commission of Pakistan notified Khawaja Saad Rafique. The decision was later turned down by Supreme court of Pakistan restoring winning candidate seat.
