= Rana Mubashir Iqbal =

Pakistani politician

Ministry for Public Affairs Unit
- Incumbent
- Assumed office 7 March 2025
- President: Asif Ali Zardari
- Prime Minister: Shehbaz Sharif

Member of the National Assembly of Pakistan
- Incumbent
- Assumed office 29 February 2024
- Constituency: NA-124 Lahore-VIII
- In office 13 August 2018 – 10 August 2023
- Constituency: NA-134 (Lahore-XII)

Personal details
- Born: Lahore, Punjab, Pakistan
- Party: PMLN (2018-present)

Rana Mubashir Iqbal is a Pakistani politician who has been a member of the National Assembly of Pakistan since February 2024 and previously served in this position from August 2018 till August 2023.

== Political career ==
He was elected to the National Assembly of Pakistan from NA-134 (Lahore-XII) as a candidate of Pakistan Muslim League (N) in the 2018 Pakistani general election. He received votes and defeated Malik Zaheer Abbas, a candidate of Pakistan Tehreek-e-Insaf (PTI).

He was re-elected to the National Assembly from NA-124 Lahore-VIII as a candidate of PML(N) in the 2024 Pakistani general election. He received 55,391 votes and defeated Zameer Ahmad, an Independent politician candidate supported by (PTI) Pakistan Tehreek-e-Insaf.
