= Muhammad Riaz Khan =

Pakistani general

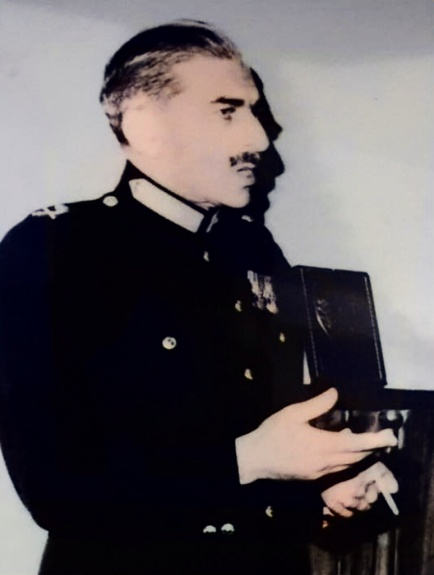
- Riaz in the late 1970s

11th Director-General of Inter-Services Intelligence
- In office October 1977 – 26 April 1979
- Preceded by: Ghulam Jilani Khan
- Succeeded by: Akhtar Abdur Rahman

Personal details
- Died: 26 April 1979
- Resting place: Dewal Sharif, Murree
- Relations: Shahid Khaqan Abbasi (son-in-law) (former Prime Minister of Pakistan)

Military service
- Allegiance: Pakistan
- Branch/service: Pakistan Army
- Commands: Adjutant-General of the Pakistan Army; Director General, Inter-Services Intelligence

Major General Muhammad Riaz Khan (Note: Urdu:محمد ریاض خان) was a two-star rank Pakistan Army general who was the eleventh Director-General of the Inter-Services Intelligence (ISI), serving from October 1977 until his death on 26 April 1979.

Prior to that, he served at the General Headquarters as Adjutant-General of the Pakistan Army.

== Early life and career ==
Muhammad Riaz Khan belonged to Dhund Abbasi tribe of the Murree region.

Riaz was well-regarded amongst the military establishment, and described as "religious minded, scrupulously honest, thoroughly professional and a committed soldier... a man of unimpeachable honesty and integrity." Although he presided over the ISI for a short term, his tenure, which occurred during Zia's era, coincided with a tumultuous period in Pakistan–U.S. relations: Bhutto's execution, the Carter administration's sanctions against Pakistan's nuclear program, the U.S. embassy burning in Islamabad, the Soviet buildup in Afghanistan, and the CIA's expanding cooperation with ISI.

== Death ==
Riaz died on 26 April 1979 from cardiac arrest. Riaz was succeeded by Akhtar Abdur Rahman.

His son-in-law, Shahid Khaqan Abbasi, became a prominent politician and was appointed as the Prime Minister of Pakistan in 2017.

== Notes ==
Military offices
Preceded by Ghulam Jilani Khan	Director-General of Inter-Services Intelligence; 1977–1979	Succeeded by Akhtar Abdur Rahman
