= PP-152 Lahore-VIII =

Constituency of the Punjabi Provincial Legislature, Pakistan

- Constituency for the Provincial Assembly of Punjab
- Region: Lahore City in Lahore District

Current constituency
- Created: 2018
- Created from: PP-143 Lahore-VII & PP-145 Lahore-IX (2002-2018); PP-151 Lahore-VIII (2018-2023)

PP-152 Lahore-VIII (پی پی-152، لاہور-8) is a Constituency of Provincial Assembly of Punjab.

== General elections 2024 ==
Provincial election 2024: PP-152 Lahore-VIII
Party	Candidate	Votes	%	±%
PML(N)	Malik Muhammad Waheed	34,664	37.41	
Independent	Nouman Majeed (Note: Filed nomination papers as PTI candidate but ECP allowed him to run as an Independent)	29,681	32.03	
TLP	Ali Adnan	19,428	20.97	
Independent	Nadeem Altaf Khan Sharwani	2,440	2.63	
Others	Others (twenty two candidates)	6,447	6.96	
Turnout		95,224	39.59	
Total valid votes		92,660	97.31	
Rejected ballots		2,564	2.69	
Majority		4,983	5.38	
Registered electors		240,525		
hold				

== General elections 2018 ==
Provincial election 2018: PP-151 Lahore-VIII
Party	Candidate	Votes	%	±%
PTI	Mian Muhammad Aslam Iqbal	65,863	50.95	
PML(N)	Baqir Hussain	51,980	40.21	
TLP	Muhammad Faisal	8,155	6.31	
MMA	Shahid Naveed Malik	1,491	1.15	
Others	Others (nine candidates)	1,783	1.38	
Turnout		130,735	52.29	
Total valid votes		129,272	98.88	
Rejected ballots		1,463	1.12	
Majority		13,883	10.74	
Registered electors		250,004		

== General elections 2013 ==
Provincial election 2013: PP-143 Lahore-VII
Party	Candidate	Votes	%	±%
PML(N)	Choudhry Shahbaz Ahmad	57,919	71.42	
PTI	Mohammad Arshad Khan	16,424	20.25	
JI	Choudhry Muhammad Shoukat	1,990	2.45	
PPP	Haji Muhammad Ahmed	1,514	1.87	
Others	Others (twenty three candidates)	3,255	4.01	
Turnout		82,179	48.79	
Total valid votes		81,102	98.69	
Rejected ballots		1,077	1.31	
Majority		41,495	51.17	
Registered electors		168,423		

== See also ==
- PP-151 Lahore-VII
- PP-153 Lahore-IX
