= Haroon Akhtar Khan =

Pakistani politician

Federal Minister for Revenue
- In office June 2015 – May 2018

Federal Minister for Industries and Production
- Incumbent
- Assumed office March 2025

Personal details
- Born: Pakistan
- Other political affiliations: Pakistan Muslim League-N
- Parent: Akhtar Abdur Rahman (father)
- Relatives: Humayun Akhtar Khan (brother)

Haroon Akhtar Khan (born 1963) is a Pakistani actuary, industrialist and politician who is currently serving as the Adviser to the Prime Minister and Federal Minister for Industries and Production. He also previously served as Special Assistant to the Prime Minister on Revenue with the status of Federal Minister from 2015 to 2018. He was previously a member of the Senate of Pakistan from 2006 to 2012 and again for a second term in 2018.

== Early life and education ==
Khan was born in 1963 in Karachi to General Akhtar Abdur Rahman, the director general of the ISI under military dictator General Zia-ul-Haq.

He earned his Master of Science in Actuarial Science and Business Administration from the University of Manitoba, Canada and later became a Fellow of the Society of Actuaries (SOA) in the United States and also a Fellow of the Canadian Institute of Actuaries (CIA), at the time of his qualification being the youngest actuary in the history of the profession.

== Political career ==
Khan was elected to the Provincial Assembly of Punjab in 1993 and then again in 2002.

Khan has also been elected twice to the Senate of Pakistan, serving from 2006 to 2012 and then getting elected to a second term in 2018. In his time in the Senate, Khan was an influential voice and a senior member of the Committees on Finance, Economic Affairs and Revenue as well as Industries and Production.

During his term as Special Assistant to the Prime Minister (SAPM) for Revenue, which began in 2015, Khan helped the Federal Board of Revenue collect record taxes. The tax-to-GDP ratio, a key indicator of revenue collection, reached a peak of 11.4 percent in 2017-18 under Khan's leadership.

In 2025, Haroon was appointed as the Special Assistant to the Prime Minister (SAPM) and Minister-in-Charge for Industries and Production, a move that was hailed by economic experts and industrialists given his extensive experience in economic and tax policy. In 2026, he was made the Adviser to the Prime Minister and Federal Minister for Industries and Production.
