= PP-156 Lahore-XII =

Constituency of the Provincial Assembly of Punjab, Pakistan

- Constituency for the Provincial Assembly of Punjab
- Region: Model Town of Lahore city and Walton Cantonment areas of Lahore District

Current constituency
- Created from: PP-155 Lahore-XIX (2002-2018); PP-157 Lahore-XIV (2018-2023)

PP-156 Lahore-XII (پی پی-156، لاہور-12) is a Constituency of Provincial Assembly of Punjab.

== General elections 2024 ==
Provincial election 2024: PP-156 Lahore-XII
| Party | Candidate | Votes | % | ±% |
|---|---|---|---|---|
| Independent | Ali Imtiaz (Note: Filed nomination papers as PTI candidate but ECP allowed him to run as an Independent) | 54,037 | 53.51 | |
| PML(N) | Muhammad Yasin Amir | 35,114 | 34.77 | |
| TLP | Dilshad Ahmad Zahid | 7,031 | 6.96 | |
| JI | Muhammad Khubaib Nazir | 2,180 | 2.16 | |
| Others | Others (nineteen candidates) | 2,617 | 2.60 | |
| Turnout | | 102,581 | 40.30 | |
| Total valid votes | | 100,979 | 98.44 | |
| Rejected ballots | | 1,602 | 1.56 | |
| Majority | | 18,923 | 18.74 | |
| Registered electors | | 254,544 | | |
| hold | | | | |

== General elections 2018 ==
Provincial election 2018: PP-157 Lahore-XIV
| Party | Candidate | Votes | % | ±% |
|---|---|---|---|---|
| PML(N) | Khawaja Salman Rafique | 40,125 | 46.96 | |
| PTI | Muhammad Shoaib Siddiqui | 35,415 | 41.45 | |
| TLP | Muhammad Imtiaz | 5,957 | 6.97 | |
| AAT | Muhammad Shoaib | 1,813 | 2.12 | |
| PPP | Raja Muhammad Shabbir Khan | 1,402 | 1.64 | |
| Others | Others (twelve candidates) | 731 | 0.86 | |
| Turnout | | 87,109 | 52.86 | |
| Total valid votes | | 85,443 | 98.09 | |
| Rejected ballots | | 1,666 | 1.91 | |
| Majority | | 4,710 | 5.51 | |
| Registered electors | | 164,789 | | |

== General elections 2013 ==
Provincial election 2013: PP-155 Lahore-XIX
| Party | Candidate | Votes | % | ±% |
|---|---|---|---|---|
| PML(N) | Mian Naseer Ahmad | 63,709 | 51.07 | |
| PTI | Hafiz Farhat Abbas | 42,954 | 34.43 | |
| Independent | Ahtisham Hussain | 5,276 | 4.23 | |
| PPP | Muhammad Arshaf Bhatti | 4,929 | 3.95 | |
| Markazi Jamiat Mushaikh Pakistan | Faisal Saud Bhatti | 2,290 | 1.84 | |
| TTP | Rana Muhammad Tanveer | 1,847 | 1.48 | |
| Independent | Muhammad Yousaf Bhatti | 1,257 | 1.01 | |
| Others | Others (thirty two candidates) | 2,481 | 1.99 | |
| Turnout | | 126,659 | 51.42 | |
| Total valid votes | | 124,743 | 98.49 | |
| Rejected ballots | | 1,916 | 1.51 | |
| Majority | | 20,755 | 16.64 | |
| Registered electors | | 246,334 | | |

== General elections 2008 ==
| Contesting candidates | Party affiliation | Votes polled |

== See also ==
- PP-155 Lahore-XI
- PP-157 Lahore-XIII
