= PP-154 Lahore-X =

Constituency of Punjab Provincial Assembly

- Constituency for the Provincial Assembly of Punjab
- Region: Wagha Town area including Barki Village in Lahore District

Current constituency
- Member: Malik Ghulam Habib Awan (PML-N)
- Created from: PP-158 Lahore-XXII (2002-2018); PP-153 Lahore-X (2018-2023)

PP-154 Lahore-X (پی پی-154، لاہور-10) is a Constituency of Provincial Assembly of Punjab.

== General elections 2024 ==
Provincial election 2024: PP-154 Lahore-X
Party	Candidate	Votes	%	±%
PML(N)	Malik Ghulam Habib Awan	26,015	31.64	
Independent	Shakeel Ahmad (Note: Filed nomination papers as PTI candidate but ECP allowed him to run as an Independent)	24,167	29.39	
PPP	Sufian Khalid Ghurki	12,934	15.73	
TLP	Rana Fiaz UI Hassan Khan	9,162	11.14	
Independent	Ahmad Zaheer Mayo	3,133	3.81	
JUI (F)	Shafeq Ur Rehman	2,890	3.52	
Others	Others (twenty candidates)	3,927	4.77	
Turnout		84,566	48.23	
Total valid votes		82,228	97.24	
Rejected ballots		2,338	2.76	
Majority		1,848	2.25	
Registered electors		175,351		
hold				

== General elections 2018 ==
Provincial election 2018: PP-153 Lahore-X
Party	Candidate	Votes	%	±%
PML(N)	Khawaja Imran Nazeer	44,557	58.50	
PTI	Ch. Khalid Mehmood Ghurki	19,647	25.80	
TLP	Muhammad Naeem Aslam	9,407	12.35	
MMA	Zahid Shabab Butt	1,168	1.53	
PPP	Zahid Zulfiqar Khan	765	1.00	
Others	Others (thirteen candidates)	623	0.82	
Turnout		77,650	48.18	
Total valid votes		76,167	98.09	
Rejected ballots		1,483	1.91	
Majority		24,910	32.70	
Registered electors		161,185		

== General elections 2013 ==
These elections were won by Ghulam Habib Awan in 2013 for the Sixteenth Assembly.

Provincial election 2013: PP-158 Lahore-XXII
Party	Candidate	Votes	%	±%
PML(N)	Malik Ghulam Habib Awan	35,130	41.37	
PPP	Naveed Ashiq Diyal	18,182	21.41	
Independent	Ch. Ghulam Zain Ul Abidin	15,689	18.47	
PTI	Ch. Tahir Majeed Myo	8,953	10.54	
JI	Umar Hayat Bajwa	3,195	3.76	
JUI (F)	Molana Muhammad Mushtaq	2,119	2.50	
Others	Others (twenty four candidates)	1,656	1.95	
Turnout		87,663	60.40	
Total valid votes		84,924	96.88	
Rejected ballots		2,739	3.12	
Majority		16,948	19.96	
Registered electors		145,146		

== General elections 2008 ==
These elections were won by Ghulam Habib Awan in 2008 for the Fifteenth Assembly.

== See also ==
- PP-153 Lahore-IX
- PP-155 Lahore-XI
