= PP-157 Lahore-XIII =

Constituency of the Punjabi Provincial Legislature, Pakistan

- Constituency for the Provincial Assembly of Punjab
- Region: Walton Cantonment (partly) in Lahore District

Current constituency
- Created: 2018
- Created from: PP-155 Lahore-XIX & PP-156 Lahore-XX (2002-2018); PP-156 Lahore-XIII (2018-2023)

PP-157 Lahore-XIII (پی پی-157، لاہور-13) is a Constituency of Provincial Assembly of Punjab.

== General elections 2024 ==
Provincial election 2024: PP-157 Lahore-XIII
Party	Candidate	Votes	%	±%
Independent	Hafiz Farhat Abbas (Note: Filed nomination papers as PTI candidate but ECP allowed him to run as an Independent)	45,037	51.05	
PML(N)	Naseer Ahmed	27,039	30.65	
TLP	Hafiz Mumtaz Ahmad	9,059	10.27	
JI	Muhammad Irfan	2,450	2.78	
PPP	Chaudhry Adnan Sarwar	2,046	2.32	
Others	Others (eighteen candidates)	2,584	2.93	
Turnout		89,714	40.02	
Total valid votes		88,215	98.33	
Rejected ballots		1,499	1.67	
Majority		17,998	20.40	
Registered electors		224,192		
hold				

== General elections 2018 ==
Provincial election 2018: PP-156 Lahore-XIII
Party	Candidate	Votes	%	±%
PML(N)	Malik Muhammad Waheed	52,742	51.57	
PTI	Mian Muhammad Iftikhar	36,937	36.12	
TLP	Ashraf Ali	5,521	5.40	
TLI	Muhammad Abid Jalali	5,476	5.36	
Others	Others (twelve candidates)	1,589	1.55	
Turnout		103,818	54.85	
Total valid votes		102,265	98.50	
Rejected ballots		1,553	1.50	
Majority		15,805	15.45	
Registered electors		189,287		

== General elections 2013 ==
Provincial election 2013: PP-156 Lahore-XX
Party	Candidate	Votes	%	±%
PML(N)	Ch. Yaseen Sohail	48,227	49.42	
PTI	Ahsan Rasheed	39,528	40.51	
PPP	Iftikhar Ahmad Niazi	2,671	2.74	
Independent	Mubarik Aftab Gill	1,475	1.51	
JI	Waqar Nadeem Warraich	1,407	1.44	
Independent	Maj.(R) Khuda Dad Ch(KD)	1,024	1.05	
Others	Others (twenty four candidates)	3,250	3.33	
Turnout		98,821	54.07	
Total valid votes		97,582	98.75	
Rejected ballots		1,239	1.25	
Majority		8,699	8.91	
Registered electors		182,781		

== See also ==
- PP-156 Lahore-XII
- PP-158 Lahore-XIV
