= Bu Ali Shah Qalandar =

Indian Sufi saint (1209–1324)

Shaykh Sharfuddin Bu Ali Qalandar Panipati
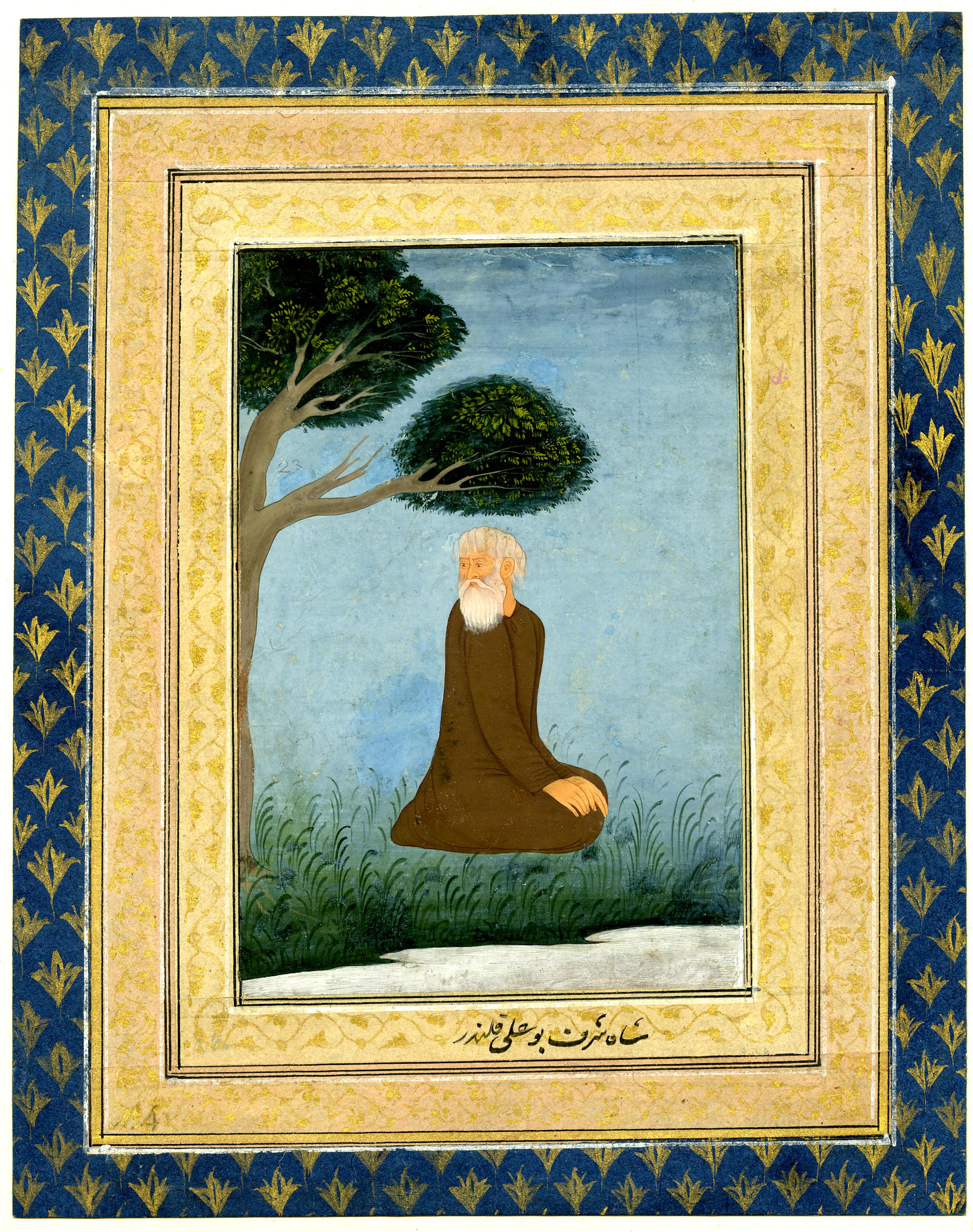
- A seated portrait of the BuʿAli Shah Qalandar. 18th-century Mughal miniature. British Museum

Bu Ali Shah Qalandar
- Born: c. 1209
- Died: c. 1324 (aged 115); Panipat, Delhi Sultanate
- Major shrine: Bu Ali Shah Qalandar Dargah, Panipat, Haryana
- Attributes: Pir Abid Arif Nomani (current Sajjada Nasheen)
- Influences: Qutbuddin Bakhtiar Kaki
- Tradition or genre: Sufi Islam

Shaykh Syed Sharfuddin Bu Ali Shah Qalandar Panipati, renowned as Bu Ali Qalandar (1209–1324 CE), born in Panipat, Delhi Sultanate, present-day Haryana, India, was a Qalandar and Sufi saint of the Owaisī Order, who lived and taught in India. His dargah (Shrine) is located in Panipat, and is a place of pilgrimage for his followers.

His real name was Sharfuddin but he is well known by his title Bu Ali Shah Qalandar. His father Syed Muhammad Abu al Hassan Fakharuddin also known as Fakhar e Alam was a great scholar and saint of his time. His father was buried in Village Kirman Parachinar, Pakistan. He was descended from Imam Musa Al-Kadhim. His large descendants were moved to Pakistan after partition in 1947. He completed his studies at an early age and subsequently taught near the Qutub Minar in Delhi for 20 years. He published a collection of Persian poetry by the name of "Diwan Hazrat Sharafuddeen Bu Ali Qalandar" which was later translated by Khawaja Shahudin in Punjabi. It was a great Sufi work in Persian language. Some other famous Qalandars include Lal Shahbaz Qalandar and Shams Ali Qalandar.

== Birthplace ==
One account says he was born in early 1209 and lived till 1324 in Panipat, during the rule of Delhi Sultanate. His father, Sheikh Fakhar Uddin was a famous scholar of his time. His mother was Hafiza Jamal, the daughter of Maulana Nemat Ullah Hamdani. Some people also claim his father actually came from Iraq and settled down in Panipat.

== Tomb ==
The dargah (mausoleum or shrine), mosque and enclosure at the Qalandar Chowk in Panipat were constructed by Mahabat Khan, a general, in the service of the Mughal Emperor Jahangir. Mahabat Khan's own tomb in red sandstone is adjacent to the saint's mausoleum. The tombs of Hakim Mukaram Khan and the Urdu poet Maulana Altaf Hussain Hali are also located within the enclosure. A nearby structure is the tomb of the last Lodi dynasty ruler of Delhi, Ibrahim Lodi, killed in the First Battle of Panipat (1526).

The left wall of the mausoleum has a qasida (panegyric) embossed and painted in blue and gold, written by Zahuri Neishabouri, who visited India during the reign of Akbar.

A large number of people from all walks of life, Hindus, Muslims, Sikhs and Christians visit the tomb and offer prayers there each Thursday and during the annual Urs Mela.

== Gallery ==
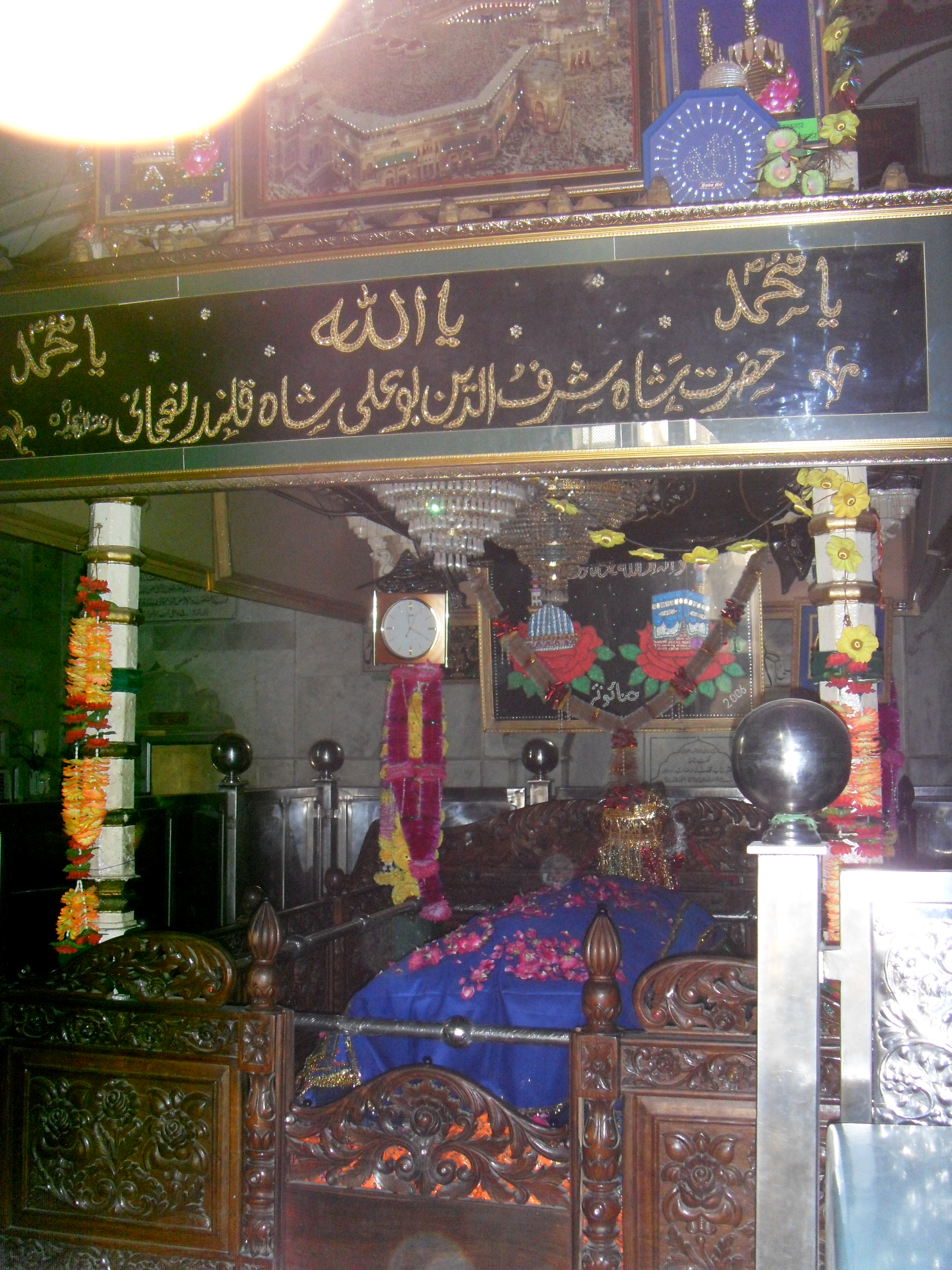
Tomb of Bu Ali Shah Qalandar

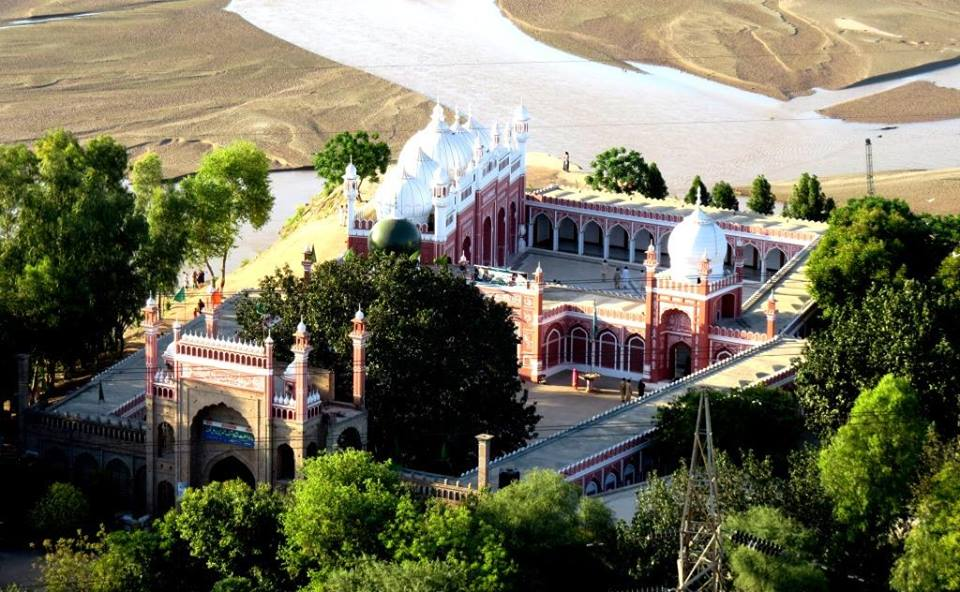
Chilla Gah of Bu Ali Qalandar in Chiniot, Punjab, Pakistan

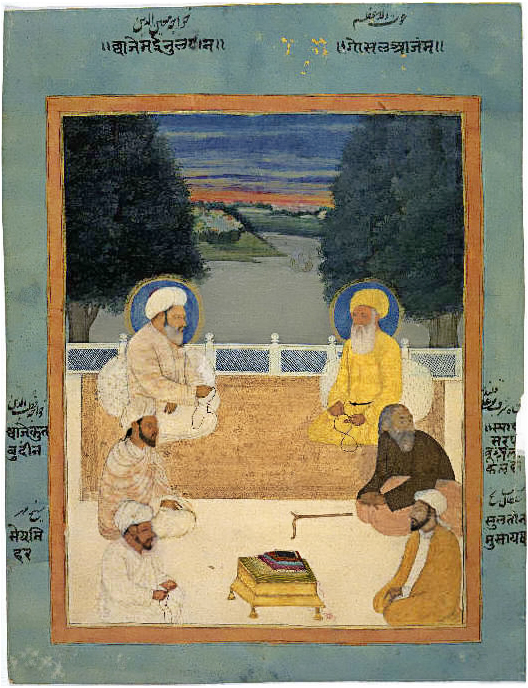
Six Sufi masters: Khvaja Mu'in al-Din, Ghaus al-A'zam, Khvaja Qutb al-Din, Shaikh Mihr, Shah Sharafuddeen Bu 'Ali Qalandar and Sultan Musa Shaikh
