= Begum Farhat Rafique =

Pakistani politician

Begum Farhat Khawaja Rafique MPA

Member of the Provincial Assembly of the Punjab
- In office 1985–1988

Personal details
- Relations: Khawaja Saad Rafique (son); Khawaja Salman Rafique (son)

Begum Farhat Khawaja Rafique is a Pakistani and educationist politician who had been a member of the Provincial Assembly of the Punjab between 1985 and 1988.

== Family ==
She is mother of former Minister for Railways Khawaja Saad Rafique and Khawaja Salman Rafique.

== Social activism ==
She has been running the Khwaja Mohammad Rafiq Memorial School, dedicated to the memory of her assassinated husband, and has served as Chairperson of the Social Welfare Committee, a member of the Price Control Committee while also being active in other social welfare groups.

== Political career ==
She was elected from PP-106 – Lahore as an independent candidate in 1985 Pakistani general election.
