= PP-155 Lahore-XI =

Constituency of the Punjabi Provincial Legislature, Pakistan

- Constituency for the Provincial Assembly of Punjab
- Region: Lahore Cantonment in Lahore District

Current constituency
- Created from: PP-146 Lahore-X (2002-2018); PP-154 Lahore-XI (2018-2023)

PP-155 Lahore-XI (پی پی-155، لاہور-11) is a Constituency of Provincial Assembly of Punjab.

== General elections 2024 ==
Provincial election 2024: PP-155 Lahore-XI
Party	Candidate	Votes	%	±%
Independent	Imtiaz Mehmood	36,731	41.98	
PML(N)	Naeem Shahzad	30,898	35.32	
TLP	Muhammad Umar	8,273	9.46	
Independent	Bilal Aslam	3,291	3.76	
Others	Others (twenty four candidates)	10,573	9.48	
Turnout		92,038	40.78	
Total valid votes		89,766	97.53	
Rejected ballots		2,272	2.47	
Majority		5,833	6.66	
Registered electors		225,696		
hold				

== General elections 2018 ==
Provincial election 2018: PP-154 Lahore-XI
Party	Candidate	Votes	%	±%
PML(N)	Chaudry Akhtar Ali	53,530	55.43	
PTI	Hafiz Mansab Awan	30,047	31.11	
TLI	Nadeem Altaf Khan Sherwani	6,014	6.23	
Independent	Sadam Hussain	3,855	3.99	
Others	Others (seventeen candidates)	3,132	3.24	
Turnout		97,931	54.12	
Total valid votes		96,578	98.62	
Rejected ballots		1,353	1.38	
Majority		23,483	24.32	
Registered electors		180,956		

== General elections 2013 ==
Provincial election 2013: PP-146 Lahore-X
Party	Candidate	Votes	%	±%
PML(N)	Malik Muhammad Waheed	55,850	65.69	
PTI	Jamshaid Iqbal	23,841	28.04	
PPP	Zahid Zulfiqar Khan	2,367	2.78	
Others	Others (thirty two candidates)	2,962	3.48	
Turnout		86,097	54.54	
Total valid votes		85,020	98.75	
Rejected ballots		1,077	1.25	
Majority		32,009	37.65	
Registered electors		157,860		

== General elections 2008 ==
Contesting candidates	Party affiliation	Votes polled

== See also ==
- PP-154 Lahore-X
- PP-156 Lahore-XII
