= NA-122 Lahore-VI =

Pakistan national assembly constituency

- Constituency for the National Assembly of Pakistan
- Region: Lahore Cantonment Tehsil, Model Town Tehsil (partly), and Shalimar Tehsil (partly) of Lahore District
- Electorate: 570,537

Current constituency
- Created: 2024
- Party: Pakistan Tehreek-e-Insaf
- Member: Latif Khosa
- Created from: NA-125 Lahore-VIII, NA-129 Lahore-XII, NA-130 Lahore-XIII

NA-122 Lahore-VI (این اے-122، لاہور-6) is a constituency of the National Assembly of Pakistan, located in Lahore District, Punjab. It was created through the 2023 delimitation and principally comprises Lahore Cantonment Tehsil, along with parts of Model Town Tehsil and Shalimar Tehsil. The predecessor constituency under the 2018 delimitation was designated NA-131 Lahore-IX. At the 2024 general election the registered electorate stood at 570,537.

== Members of Parliament ==
=== 2018 to 2023: NA-131 Lahore-IX ===
Election	Member	Party
2018	Imran Khan	PTI
By-election 2018	Khawaja Saad Rafique	PML-N

=== 2024 to present: NA-122 Lahore-VI ===
Election	Member	Party
2024	Latif Khosa	PTI (Note: Filed nomination papers as a PTI candidate but was required by the Election Commission of Pakistan to contest as an independent candidate.)

== 2018 general election ==
General elections were held on 25 July 2018. Imran Khan, then chairman of PTI, won the seat under the predecessor designation NA-131 Lahore-IX but subsequently vacated it, along with three other constituencies, in favour of NA-95 (Mianwali-I).

General election 2018: NA-131 Lahore-IX
Party	Candidate	Votes	%	±%
PTI	Imran Khan	84,313	44.68	
PML(N)	Khawaja Saad Rafique	83,633	44.32	
Others	Others (thirteen candidates)	20,765	11.00	
Turnout		191,546	52.59	
Total valid votes		188,711	98.52	
Rejected ballots		2,835	1.48	
Majority		680	0.36	
Registered electors		364,213		
PTI win (new seat)				

== 2018 by-election ==
A by-election was held on 14 October 2018 following Imran Khan's vacation of the seat. Khawaja Saad Rafique of PML-N won with 60,476 votes.

By-election 2018: NA-131 Lahore-IX
Party	Candidate	Votes	%	±%
PML(N)	Khawaja Saad Rafique	60,476	52.51	▲8.19
PTI	Humayun Akhtar Khan	50,445	43.80	▼0.88
Others	Others (twenty-six candidates)	4,242	3.69	
Turnout		116,142	31.76	▼20.83
Total valid votes		115,163	99.16	▲0.64
Rejected ballots		979	0.84	▼0.64
Majority		10,031	8.71	▲9.07
Registered electors		365,677		
PML(N) gain from PTI		Swing	▲4.54	

== 2024 general election ==
General elections were held on 8 February 2024. Latif Khosa, standing as an independent candidate with PTI affiliation, won the seat with 117,124 votes.

General election 2024: NA-122 Lahore-VI
Party	Candidate	Votes	%	±%
PTI	Latif Khosa	117,124	51.51	▲7.71
PML(N)	Khawaja Saad Rafique	77,913	34.27	▼18.24
Others	Others (twenty-six candidates)	32,344	14.22	
Turnout		231,334	40.55	▲8.79
Total valid votes		227,381	98.29	
Rejected ballots		3,953	1.71	▼0.64
Majority		39,211	17.24	
Registered electors		570,537		
