= 1988 Pakistan Air Force C-130B crash =

1988 aircraft crash in Pakistan

1988 PAF C-130B crash
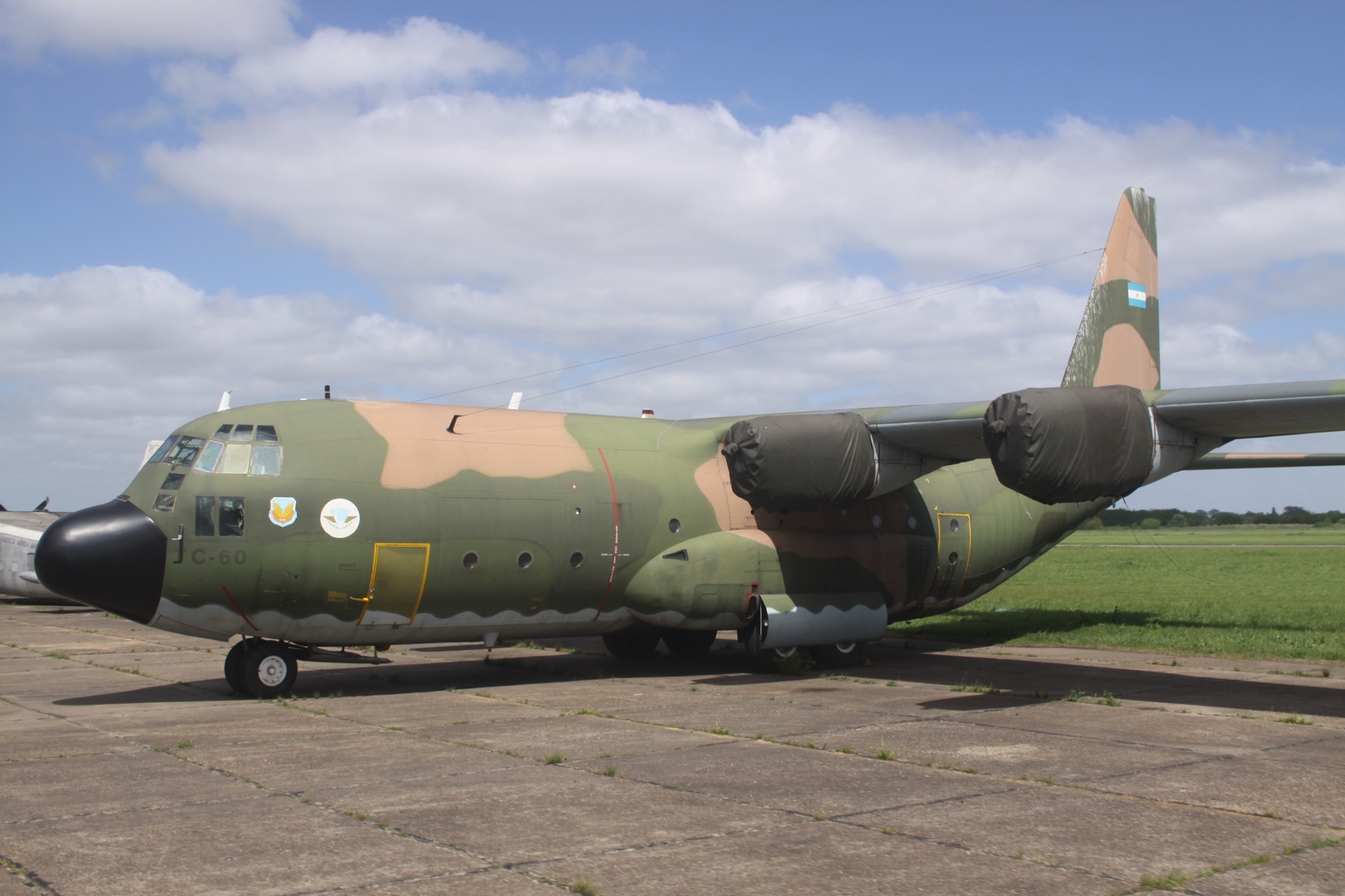
- An Argentine Air Force C-130B, similar to the aircraft involved

Accident
- Date: 17 August 1988
- Summary: Crashed after takeoff; disputed cause
- Site: Near Bahawalpur Airport, Sutlej River

Aircraft
- Aircraft type: Lockheed C-130B Hercules
- Operator: Pakistan Air Force
- Registration: 23494
- Flight origin: Bahawalpur Airport, Pakistan
- Destination: Islamabad Airport, Pakistan
- Occupants: 30
- Passengers: 17
- Crew: 13
- Fatalities: 30
- Survivors: 0

On 17 August 1988, a Lockheed C-130B Hercules operated by the Pakistan Air Force with thirty people onboard crashed in Bahawalpur, Pakistan. Among the victims were President Muhammad Zia-ul-Haq, his close confidant CJCSC Akhtar Abdur Rahman, ISPR director-general Siddique Salik and United States ambassador Arnold Lewis Raphel.

Zia's death was officially announced a few hours later on Radio Pakistan and Pakistan Television Network by Ghulam Ishaq Khan, the Chairman of the Senate of Pakistan, who assumed the presidency. Zia's state funeral took place at the Faisal Mosque in Islamabad, drawing around a million mourners.

== Background ==
On 17 August 1988, Zia, with his senior delegation, arrived in Bahawalpur where he was joined by the two American Christian missionaries to visit the local convent to condole the death of an American nun murdered in Bahawalpur a few days before making a brief stop at the Tamewali Test Range. After witnessing and viewing the live fire demonstration of the U.S. Army's M1A1 Abrams at the Tamewali Test Range, President Zia and his delegation left by army helicopter. The demonstration was organized by Major-General Mahmud Ali Durrani, then-GOC of the 1st Armoured Division of the Armoured Corps as the M1A1 Abrams, the standard U.S. Army's weapon system was expected to join service with the Pakistan Army.

== Aircraft crash ==
At 15:40 (PKT) on 17 August 1988 the VIP flight took off from Bahawalpur Airport. On board the C-130B plane were a total of 30 people (17 passengers and 13 crew members); with Zia were a group of senior Pakistani army officers, ambassador Raphel and Brigadier General Herbert M. Wassom, the chief of the U.S. military mission in Pakistan. The plane had been fitted with an air-conditioned VIP capsule where Zia and his American guests were seated. It was walled off from the flight crew and a passenger and baggage section in the rear.

The aircraft departed Bahawalpur early, ahead of a storm. For two minutes and 30 seconds, it rose into a clear sky. Takeoff was smooth and without problems. At 15:51, Bahawalpur control tower lost contact, and the plane plunged from the sky and struck the ground with such force that it was blown to pieces and wreckage scattered over a wide area. Witnesses cited in Pakistan's official investigation said that the C-130B began to pitch "in an up-and-down motion" while flying low shortly after takeoff before going into a "near-vertical dive", exploding on impact, killing all on board. There were many investigations into this crash but no satisfactory cause was ever found.

== Passengers and crew ==
All 30 individuals on board—17 passengers and 13 crew members—were killed in the crash. While official public inquiry reports and international media coverage published the names of high-ranking diplomatic, political, and military personnel, lower-ranking flight crew, security details, and personal staff were grouped categorically in released summaries.

=== High command and diplomatic officials ===
- Muhammad Zia-ul-Haq – President of Pakistan and Chief of Army Staff
- Arnold Lewis Raphel – United States Ambassador to Pakistan
- Brigadier General Herbert M. Wassom – Chief of the United States Defense Representative Office to Pakistan
- General Akhtar Abdur Rahman – Chairman of the Joint Chiefs of Staff Committee

=== Senior military officers ===
- Lieutenant General Mian Muhammad Afzaal – Chief of General Staff
- Major General Muhammad Sharif Nasir – Director General, CD Directorate
- Major General Muhammad Hussain Awan – General Officer Commanding, 23rd Division
- Major General Muhammad Abdus Sami – General Officer Commanding, 11th Division
- Major General Khawaja Moinuddin Ahmed – Director General, Artillery Directorate
- Brigadier Abdul Latif – Commander, 501 Central Workshop
- Brigadier Abdul Majeed – Director, EME Directorate
- Brigadier Najeeb Ahmed – Commander, 57 Infantry Brigade
- Brigadier Siddique Salik – Director General, Inter-Services Public Relations
- Colonel Safdar Mahmud – President's Secretariat
- Captain Rana Zahid Farooq Khan – Staff Officer, Chief of General Staff Secretariat

=== Flight crew ===
- Wing Commander Mashhood Hassan – Aircraft Commander / Lead Pilot
- Flight Lieutenant Sajid – Co-Pilot
- Flight Lieutenant Naeem – Navigator
- Squadron Leader Zulfiqar – Flight Engineer

=== Personal staff and aides ===
- Captain Pir Muhammad – Aide-de-Camp to President Zia
- Subedar Major Muhammad Shafique – Personal Attendant / Valet

=== Unnamed support personnel ===
Nine additional individuals on board were not individually identified in publicly released official inquiry summaries:

- Technical ground and flight crew assigned to the No. 35 Air Transport Wing (Chaklala Air Base)
- Special security personnel assigned to Pak-1
- Junior personal services and mess staff

== Investigation ==
Washington sent a team of United States Air Force officers to assist the Pakistanis in the investigation, but the two sides reached sharply different conclusions, leading to distrust as well as many arguments and fights.

=== U.S. conclusions ===
Mrs Ely-Raphel and Brigadier-General Wassom's widow were both told by U.S. investigators that the crash had been caused by a mechanical problem common with the C-130, and that a similar incident had occurred to a C-130 in Colorado which had narrowly avoided crashing. Mahmud Ali Durrani also blamed the C-130 which he said historically had issues.

Robert Oakley, who replaced Arnold Raphel as U.S. ambassador following the crash and helped to handle the investigation, has also expressed this view. He has pointed out that 20 or 30 C-130s have suffered similar incidents. He has identified the mechanical fault as a problem with the hydraulics in the tail assembly. Although USAF pilots had handled similar emergencies, the Pakistani pilots were less well equipped to do so, lacking C-130 experience and also flying low.

Ronan Farrow indicates that the FBI had a statutory authority to investigate the event but was ordered by Shultz "to stay away". Also, the CIA did not investigate. Air Force investigators who had been at the crash site ruled out mechanical failure but their report was not made public.

=== Pakistani conclusions ===
Some weeks after the crash, a 27-page summary of a secret 365-page report was released by Pakistani investigators in which they said that they had found evidence of possible problems with the aircraft's elevator booster package, as well as frayed or snapped control cables. Analysis by a U.S. lab found "extensive contamination" by brass and aluminium particles in the elevator booster package, but the report said "failure of the elevator control system due to a mechanical failure...is ruled out". It cited the aircraft-maker Lockheed as saying that "even with the level of contamination found in the system, they have not normally experienced any problems other than wear".

The report concluded that the contamination of the elevator booster package might at worst have caused sluggish controls leading to overcontrol but not to an accident. In the absence of a mechanical cause, the Pakistani inquiry concluded that the crash was due to an act of sabotage. They found no conclusive evidence of an explosion on the aircraft but said that chemicals that could be used in small explosives were detected in mango seeds and a piece of rope found on the aircraft. They also added that "the use of a chemical agent to incapacitate the pilots and thus perpetuate the accident therefore remains a distinct possibility".

=== Journalistic investigation ===
Journalist and author Mohammed Hanif, who became head of the BBC's Urdu-language service, told American journalist Dexter Filkins that, while working in London after 1996, he "became consumed" with determining how Zia was killed. Hanif "made phone calls and researched the lives of those around Zia", attempting to assess possible perpetrators—"the C.I.A., the Israelis, the Indians, the Soviets, rivals inside the Army". He stated he was "met with silence". "No one would talk—not Zia's wife, not the Ambassador's wife, no one in the Army.... I realized, there's no way in hell I'll ever find out." Hanif later wrote the novel A Case of Exploding Mangoes which humorously describes four assassinations all occurring simultaneously. The possible assassins are a senior Pakistani Army officer, a Trade Union on behalf of a murder official, a crow on behalf of a blind woman imprisoned for fornication after a rape and the son of an army officer killed by Zia.

== Theories ==
According to Barbara Crossette, The New York Times' South Asia bureau chief from 1988 to 1991:

Of all the violent political deaths in the twentieth century, none with such great interest to the U.S. has been more clouded than the mysterious air crash that killed president (and Army Chief General) Muhammad Zia-ul-Haq of Pakistan in (August) 1988, a tragedy that also claimed the life of the serving American ambassador and most of Zia's top commanders.

No evidence has come to light to prove a conspiracy, but there have been several theories variously implicating the Soviet Union, India as well as the United States. Zia's death "entails the mist of conspiracy theory".

=== Assassination theories ===
Stoking the suspicion that the Soviets were involved in the plane crash, one of the fatalities was General Akhtar Abdur Rehman, the Chairman Joint Chiefs of Staff Committee and former head of the nation's spy agency, Inter Service Intelligence (ISI); Abdur Rehman was a coordinator of the Afghan mujahideen during the Soviet–Afghan War.

Hamid Gul, the Director-General of the Inter-Services Intelligence, told The Times that Zia was killed in a conspiracy involving a "foreign power". Early reports suggested that Raphel had only been summoned to join the flight at the last minute, which fueled conspiracy theories blaming the United States. However, Raphel's widow has stated that her husband always planned to join Zia on the aircraft, and that it was General Wassom who was added at the last minute.

People have also pointed to some senior dissatisfied generals within the Pakistan Army itself.

=== Other hypotheses ===
Some suspected the anti-Zia group al-Zulfiqar, led by Murtaza Bhutto, brother of Benazir Bhutto, who would ultimately gain most from Zia's departure. Zia's son Ijaz-ul-Haq told Barbara Crossette a year after the crash that he was "101 percent sure" that Murtaza was involved. Benazir Bhutto suggested that the fatal crash might well have been an "act of God".

Writing in the Fall 2005 issue of World Policy Journal, former U.S. ambassador to India John Gunther Dean blamed Mossad, the Israeli intelligence agency, for orchestrating Zia's assassination in retaliation for Pakistan developing a nuclear weapon to counteract India, and to prevent Zia, an effective Muslim leader, from continuing to influence U.S. foreign policy. However, Dean said he had no proof for his assertion.

== Aftermath ==
The Government of Pakistan announced that a state funeral would take place, and that Zia would be buried with military honors in a specially crafted white marble tomb, adjacent to Shah Faisal Mosque in Islamabad. The funeral, on 19 August 1988, was attended by 30 heads of state, including the presidents of Bangladesh, China, Egypt, Iran, India, Turkey, and the United Arab Emirates, as well as representatives of the kings of Saudi Arabia and Jordan. Key American politicians, U.S. Embassy staff in Islamabad, key personnel of the Pakistan Armed Forces, and chiefs of staff of the Army, Navy, Air Force also attended the funeral, as did the Aga Khan IV. It was held with full military honors that included a sounding by light artillery QF-25 of a 21-gun salute. During the ceremony, nearly 1 million mourners chanted "Zia ul-Haq, you will live as long as the sun and moon remain above." He was buried in a 1.2-by-3-metre grave in front of the Faisal Mosque that Zia ordered the construction built of in honour of King Faisal of Saudi Arabia and the friendship between Pakistan and Saudi Arabia. In attendance was his successor President Ghulam Ishaq Khan, members of the Joint Chiefs of Staff Committee, high-ranking military and civilian officials, as well as foreign dignitaries such as President Yang Shangkun of China, President Hussain Muhammad Ershad of Bangladesh and US Secretary of State George P. Shultz. Shultz called Zia "a great fighter for freedom," while Vice President George H. W. Bush called him a "great friend."

Elections were held in 1988 and Benazir Bhutto became prime minister.

== See also ==
- List of unsolved deaths
- Władysław Sikorski's death controversy, a similar plane crash involving the Polish prime minister in exile

== Sources ==
- Bone, James; Hussain, Zahid (August 16, 2008), "As Pakistan comes full circle, a light is shone on Zia ul-Haq's death", The Times, London, p. 40, archived from the original on June 2, 2010
