= NA-124 Lahore-VIII =

Pakistani national assembly constituency

- Constituency for the National Assembly of Pakistan
- Region: Model Town Tehsil (partly) of Lahore District
- Electorate: 310,116

Current constituency
- Created: 2024
- Party: Pakistan Muslim League (N)
- Member: Rana Mubashir Iqbal
- Created from: NA-125 Lahore-VIII, NA-129 Lahore-XII

NA-124 Lahore-VIII (این اے-124، لاہور-8) is a constituency of the National Assembly of Pakistan, located in Lahore District, Punjab. Created through the 2023 delimitation, it comprises census charges two, three, four and parts of charge sixteen of Model Town Tehsil. The predecessor constituency under the 2018 delimitation was designated NA-134 Lahore-XII. At the 2024 general election the registered electorate stood at 310,116.

== Members of Parliament ==
=== 2018 to 2023: NA-134 Lahore-XII ===
Election	Member	Party
2018	Rana Mubashir Iqbal	PML-N

=== 2024 to present: NA-124 Lahore-VIII ===
Election	Member	Party
2024	Rana Mubashir Iqbal	PML-N

== 2018 general election ==
General elections were held on 25 July 2018. Rana Mubashir Iqbal of PML-N won the seat under the predecessor designation NA-134 Lahore-XII with 76,291 votes.

General election 2018: NA-134 Lahore-XII
Party	Candidate	Votes	%	±%
PML(N)	Rana Mubashir Iqbal	76,291	53.88	
PTI	Malik Zaheer Abbas	45,991	32.48	
Others	Others (nine candidates)	19,315	13.64	
Turnout		144,592	53.40	
Total valid votes		141,597	97.93	
Rejected ballots		2,995	2.07	
Majority		30,300	21.40	
Registered electors		270,783		
PML(N) win (new seat)				

== 2024 general election ==
General elections were held on 8 February 2024. Rana Mubashir Iqbal retained the seat with 55,391 votes.

General election 2024: NA-124 Lahore-VIII
Party	Candidate	Votes	%	±%
PML(N)	Rana Mubashir Iqbal	55,391	44.31	▼9.57
PTI	Zameer Ahmad (Note: Filed nomination papers as a PTI candidate but was required by the Election Commission of Pakistan to contest as an independent candidate.)	43,603	34.88	▲2.40
TLP	Irfan Ali Bhatti	18,101	14.48	▲7.49
Others	Others (ten candidates)	7,909	6.33	
Turnout		127,843	41.22	▼12.18
Total valid votes		125,004	97.78	
Rejected ballots		2,839	2.22	
Majority		11,788	9.43	▼11.97
Registered electors		310,116		
PML(N) hold				
