= Muhammad Tajammal Hussain =

Pakistani politician (1966–2019)

Member of the Provincial Assembly of the Punjab
- In office 2002 – 31 May 2018

Personal details
- Born: 1 January 1966 Lahore, Pakistan
- Died: 23 February 2019 (aged 53)
- Party: Pakistan Muslim League (N)

Rana Muhammad Tajammal Hussain (1 January 1966 - 23 February 2019) was a Pakistani politician who was a Member of the Provincial Assembly of the Punjab, from 2002 to May 2018.

== Early life and education ==
He was born on 1 January 1966 in Lahore.

He graduated from University of the Punjab in 1985 and has the degree of Bachelor of Arts.

== Political career ==
He was elected to the Provincial Assembly of the Punjab as a candidate of Pakistan Muslim League (N) (PML-N) from Constituency PP-157 (Lahore-XXI) in the 2002 Pakistani general election. He received 14,356 votes and defeated a candidate of Pakistan Muslim League (Q).

He was re-elected to the Provincial Assembly of the Punjab as a candidate of PML-N from Constituency PP-157 (Lahore-XXI) in the 2008 Pakistani general election. He received 27,318 votes and defeated a candidate of Pakistan Peoples Party. From 2008 to 2013, he served as Parliamentary Secretary for Industries.

He was re-elected to the Provincial Assembly of the Punjab as a candidate of PML-N from Constituency PP-157 (Lahore-XXI) in the 2013 Pakistani general election.

He died on 23 February 2019 due to heart attack.
