= Khawaja Muhammad Islam =

Pakistani politician

Member of the Provincial Assembly of Punjab
- In office 1 June 2013 – 18 July 2013
- Constituency: PP-72 Faisalabad-XXI
- In office 2008–2013
- Constituency: PP-72 Faisalabad-XXI
- In office 1997–1999
- Constituency: PP-72 Faisalabad-XXI
- In office 1993–1996
- Constituency: PP-72 Faisalabad-XXI

Personal details
- Born: September 13, 1953 (age 73) Faisalabad
- Party: Pakistan Muslim League (N) (1985-present)

Khawaja Muhammad Islam is a politician from Faisalabad, Pakistan. He is affiliated with Pakistan Muslim League (N) and served as city president. He is a member of Pakistan Muslim League (N) provincial organising committee.

A businessman, who has been a Member of Provincial Assembly of Punjab between 1993 and 1996, and between 1997 and 1999; and has returned to the Punjab Assembly for a fourth term in general election of 2013. He has visited United Kingdom, Japan, India, Hong Kong, Bangkok and Malaysia. He represents PP-72 (Faisalabad-XXII).

On July 18, 2013, the Supreme Court of Pakistan, initiated criminal proceedings against Islam for holding a fake degree. His victory notification from PP-72 was also suspended.

== Early life and education ==
Khawaja Muhammad Islam child of Mr Muhammad Noise (late) was born on September 13, 1953 at Faisalabad and could be a graduate in Trade Organization.

== Political career ==
He was elected to Punjab Assembly in the 1993 Pakistani General Election.

He re-was elected to Punjab Assembly in the 1997 Pakistani General Election.

He re-was elected to Punjab Assembly in the 2008 Pakistani General Election.

He re-was elected to Punjab Assembly in the 2013 Pakistani General Election.

On July 18, 2013, the Supreme Court of Pakistan, started criminal procedures against Islam for holding a fake degree. His triumph notice from PP-72 was moreover suspended.
