= Khoj =

Khoj or KHOJ may refer to:

== Film ==
- Khoj (1953 film), a Bollywood film of 1953
- Khoj (1971 film), an Indian Hindi-language drama film
- Khoj (1989 film), an Indian Hindi-language mystery thriller film
- Khoj, an Indian short film by Tridib Poddar, in competition at the 2002 Cannes Film Festival
- Khoj: The Search, a 2010 Bangladeshi romantic action film
- Khoj (2017 film), an Indian Bengali-language psychological thriller film

== Other uses ==
- KHOJ (AM), a radio station in Missouri
- KHOJ (arts organization), a Delhi-based arts association

== See also ==
- Khoja (disambiguation)
