= PP-153 Lahore-IX =

Constituency of the Provincial Assembly of Punjab, Pakistan

- Constituency for the Provincial Assembly of Punjab
- Region: Lahore City in Lahore District

Current constituency
- Created from: PP-145 Lahore-IX (2002-2018); PP-152 Lahore-IX (2018-2023)

PP-153 Lahore-IX (پی پی-153، لاہور-9) is a Constituency of Provincial Assembly of Punjab.

== General elections 2024 ==
Provincial election 2024: PP-153 Lahore-IX
Party	Candidate	Votes	%	±%
PML(N)	Khawaja Salman Rafique	35,233	41.05	
Independent	Mian Awais Anjum (Note: Filed nomination papers as PTI candidate but ECP allowed him to run as an Independent)	33,029	38.48	
TLP	Malik Muhammad Amir	8,974	10.46	
Independent	Nadeem Altaf Khan Sherwani	4,432	5.16	
JI	Muhammad Zaid Bin Sajjad	2,163	2.52	
Others	Others (twenty candidates)	1,996	2.33	
Turnout		87,915	41.40	
Total valid votes		85,827	97.62	
Rejected ballots		2,088	2.38	
Majority		2,204	2.57	
Registered electors		212,342		
hold				

== General elections 2018 ==
Provincial election 2018: PP-152 Lahore-IX
Party	Candidate	Votes	%	±%
PML(N)	Rana Mashood Ahmad Khan	43,670	44.17	
PTI	Muhammad Irshad Dogar	37,166	37.59	
TLP	Munawar Zaman	7,750	7.84	
Independent	Saeed Ahmad Khan	4,910	4.97	
PPP	Asif Mehmood Nagra	2,988	3.02	
MMA	Muhammad Abu Bakar	1,259	1.27	
Others	Others (ten candidates)	1,113	1.14	
Turnout		100,551	52.17	
Total valid votes		98,876	98.33	
Rejected ballots		1,675	1.67	
Majority		6,504	6.58	
Registered electors		192,725		

== General elections 2013 ==
Provincial election 2013: PP-145 Lahore-IX
Party	Candidate	Votes	%	±%
PML(N)	Muhammad Waheed Gul	59,521	70.40	
PTI	Tariq Hameed	17,945	21.22	
PPP	Haji Imdad Hussain	4,347	5.14	
Others	Others (eighteen candidates)	2,737	3.24	
Turnout		85,695	51.99	
Total valid votes		84,550	98.66	
Rejected ballots		1,145	1.34	
Majority		41,576	49.18	
Registered electors		164,837		

== General elections 2008 ==
Contesting candidates	Party affiliation	Votes polled

== See also ==
- PP-152 Lahore-VIII
- PP-154 Lahore-X
