= Akhtar Abdur Rahman =

Pakistani Gunner Officer and intelligence Head (1924–1988)

Akhtar Abdur Rahman NI(M) HI(M) TI(M) SBt

5th Chairman Joint Chiefs of Staff Committee
- In office 29 March 1987 – 17 August 1988
- Preceded by: Rahimuddin Khan
- Succeeded by: Iftikhar Ahmed Sirohey

12th Director-General of Inter-Services Intelligence
- In office April 1979 – 29 March 1987
- Preceded by: Muhammad Riaz Khan
- Succeeded by: Hamid Gul

Adjutant general GHQ
- In office 1977–1979

General Officer Commanding (GOC) of the 12th Infantry Division
- In office 1974–1977

Personal details
- Born: 11 June 1924 Peshawar, British India(now in Khyber Pakhtunkhwa, Pakistan)
- Died: 17 August 1988 (aged 64) Bahawalpur, Pakistan
- Cause of death: Plane crash
- Spouse: Rashida Akhtar Khan (m. 1951–1988)
- Children: Akbar Akhtar Khan, Humayun Akhtar Khan, Haroon Akhtar Khan, Ghazi Akhtar Khan
- Education: Government College University Faisalabad
- Occupation: General, Army Officer, Soldier
- Civilian awards: Sitara-e-Basalat

Military service
- Allegiance: Pakistan
- Branch/service: Pakistan Army
- Years of service: 1947–1988
- Rank: General
- Unit: 24 Medium Regiment Artillery (Zarb ul Awwal)
- Commands: 24 Medium Regiment Artillery (Zarb ul Awwal), Artillery Headquarters of 4 Corps, GOC 12th Army Division, Murree; DG Inter-Services Intelligence (ISI)
- Battles/wars: Indo-Pakistan War of 1947; Indo-Pakistan War of 1965; Indo-Pakistan War of 1971; Soviet–Afghan War
- Military awards: Nishan-e-Imtiaz (Military); Hilal-e-Imtiaz (Military); Sitara-e-Basalat; Tamgha-e-Imtiaz (Military)

Akhtar Abdur Rahman (Note: Urdu: اختر عبد الرحمن) (11 June 1924 – 17 August 1988) was a Pakistan Army general who served as the 5th Chairman Joint Chiefs of Staff Committee from 1987 until his death in 1988. He previously served as the 12th Director-General of Inter-Services Intelligence from 1979 to 1987. During both Indo Pak wars of 1965 and 1971, he oversaw action with his own unit 24 Medium Regiment Artillery (Zarb ul Awwal) in Burki and Chambb sectors respectively.

As the DG ISI, Rahman collaborated with the Central Intelligence Agency and masterminded the resistance network of the Afghan mujahideen against the Soviet Union, eventually managing to force the Soviets out of Afghanistan. Due to his close friendship with President of Pakistan General Zia-ul-Haq, Rahman was widely considered to be the second most powerful man in the country during Zia-al-Haq's eleven-year military dictatorship. He died in a plane crash which also killed Zia-al-Haq and the US Ambassador to Pakistan, Arnold Lewis Raphel. After his death, his sons, Humayun Akhtar Khan and Haroon Akhtar Khan, became politicians and were eventually elected as the Members of Parliament and headed the key ministerial portfolios several times.

== Early life and education ==
Akhtar Abdur Rahman was born on 11 June 1924 in Peshawar, to a Kakazai Pashtun family. His father, Abdur Rahman Khan, was a doctor at a government hospital over here. He lost his father at the age of four and was raised by his mother, after the family moved to East Punjab in British India. He studied at the Bishop Cotton School, Shimla in Himachal Pradesh, India, before enrolling himself in the Government College University (Faisalabad) in 1941, subsequently earning a bachelor's degree in Science and Statistics in 1945, followed by a Master of Science in Economics in 1947.

== Military career ==
=== Rising through the ranks ===
Rahman joined the British Indian Army in 1946, before becoming Captain in the Pakistan Army three years later. After witnessing traumatic events during the partition, Abdur Rahman was appointed as an instructor at the Artillery School in Nowshera. Later, he was selected for an infantry training course with the British Army, and was sent on deputation to complete a course in the United Kingdom. Upon returning to Pakistan, he was promoted to the rank of a major and posted as a military adviser to the East Pakistan Rifles from April 1954 to October 1954. He was later transferred back to General Headquarters (GHQ) as a staff officer, a position he held from April 1956 to February 1957.

Rahman participated in the Indo-Pakistani War of 1965, and was appointed at IV Corps as an operational field officer. In the 1965 war, he gallantly defended the Lahore sector, which led to him being promoted to lieutenant-colonel, but he remained second-in-command of the artillery regiment in Lahore. After a ceasefire in September 1965, Rahman commanded his unit 45 Field Regiment Artillery and moved it to Pakistani occupied territory of war in Sundra Sector where his unit 45 Field Artillery remained deployed till February 1966. After the war, he was promoted to the rank of colonel, while being stationed with the IV Corps. Later, he was promoted to the rank of brigadier and transferred to the northern areas of the country, where he commanded an infantry brigade in Azad Kashmir.

In 1971 Indo Pak War, just before his promotion to a Major General, he again saw his own 45 Field Regiment Artillery in action at Hussainiwala Sector where 45 Field displayed tremendous valour in achieving a bold victory over Qasar-i-Hind Citadel. His unit 45 Field Regiment Artillery was later awarded battle honor of 'Fateh Qasar -i- Hind 1971' by Army Headquarters, as he was instrumental in capturing the Indian fortress of Qaiser-e-Hind. Later, he was promoted to the two-star general rank of a major-general, and served as the general officer commanding (GOC) of the 12th Infantry Division stationed in Murree. As the GOC of the 12th Infantry Division, Rahman was considered very close to Prime Minister Zulfiqar Ali Bhutto and personally received him whenever he visited the command office of the 12th Division.

Rahman did not take part in the 1977 Pakistani military coup, and privately opposed the martial law to remove Bhutto. Six months after the military coup of 1977, he was appointed as the adjutant general at the General Headquarters, which would last two years. During this time, Rahman became aware of a conspiracy in which Lieutenant-General Faiz Ali Chishti of X Corps, a close associate of General Zia-ul-Haq, secretly became rebellious and conspired to stage a military coup in the country.

Around early 1979, Rahman received a call from Chishti and met him at his office in Chaklala Military District (CMD). Chishti informed him of the conspiracy that aimed to topple Zia-ul-Haq and sought his assistance. According to the News International's intelligence unit, Chishti was under the impression that since Rahman had not been promoted, he would accept this invitation; especially when he was promised that after the coup worked out successfully, he would not only be promoted but would also become one of the pillars of the new regime. After returning to the GHQ, Rahman contacted Zia-ul-Haq and foiled the plot against him. In June 1979, after the counter-coup had been foiled, Zia-ul-Haq awarded Rahman a promotion to Lieutenant General and appointed him Director General of the Pakistan intelligence agency, ISI.

=== Soviet–Afghan War ===
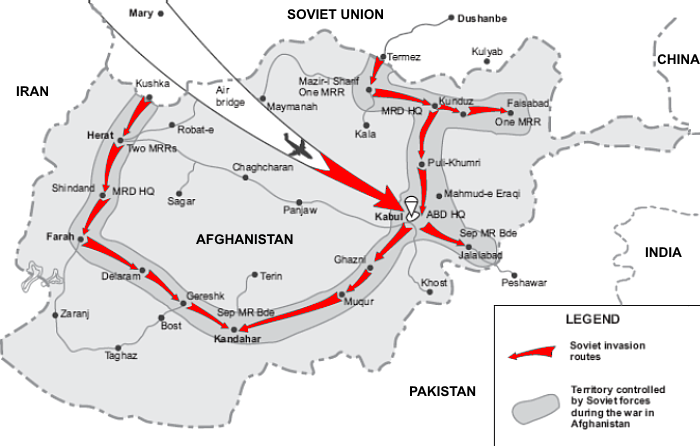
Map of Soviet movements in the 1979 Soviet invasion of Afghanistan

When the Soviet Union deployed its 40th Army in Afghanistan, Pakistan's top military base led by Akhtar, believed that Pakistan would be the Soviet Union's next target. They felt that because of Pakistan's strategic location and given the fact that it had warm water ports in the Arabian Sea, it was a prime target for future invasion.

Considering the Soviet invasion of Afghanistan threatened Pakistan's national security, the ISI started providing financial, military, and strategic assistance to the Afghan mujahideen. The ISI received billions of dollars in military assistance from the CIA and Saudi Arabia, to train and command the Afghan rebels in a bid to defeat the Soviets. This covert operation was known as Operation Cyclone, and was executed with the CIA, providing the money and weapons, the ISI training, commanding the mujahideen groups, and the mujahideen conducting guerrilla warfare, ultimately leading to the Soviet withdrawal from Afghanistan. During this time, Rahman developed a highly effective working relationship with key figures in the United States including CIA Director William Casey and Congressman Charlie Wilson.

While heading the ISI, Rahman's influence on Pakistan's atomic weapons program grew, and he worked tirelessly to collect colleagues around him who were equally dynamic and determined to make the ISI an organization that would influence the domestic and external policies of the country. It was under him that the ISI became recognized as one of the most powerful spy agencies in the world. In 1987, Rahman was promoted to the four-star rank and was appointed Chairman of the Joint Chiefs of Staff Committee, the highest ranking four-star rank in the Pakistan Armed Forces.

== Death and investigation ==
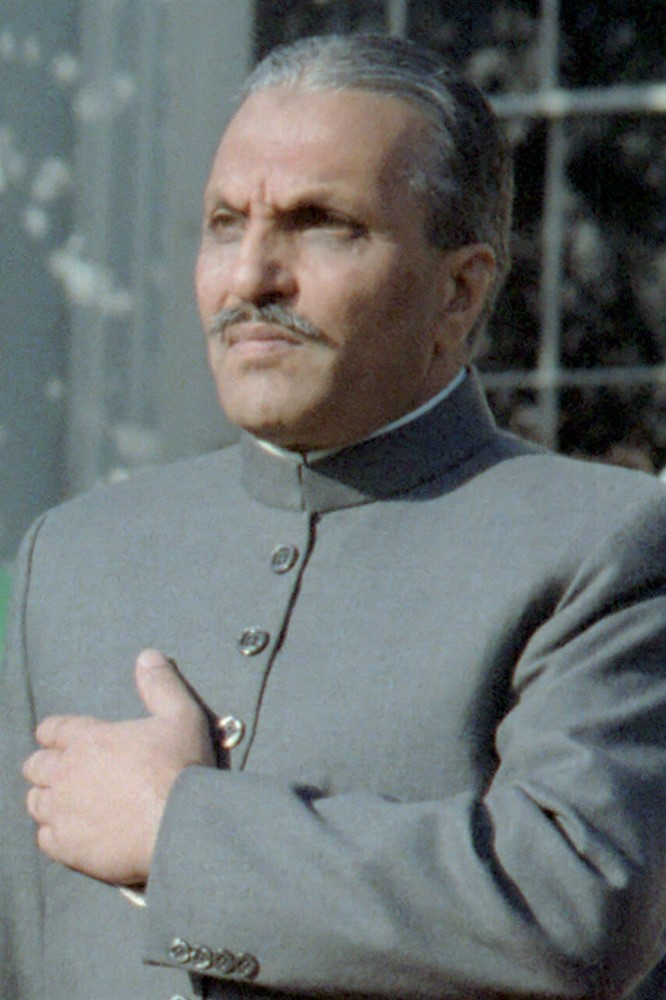
Zia-ul-Haq

On 17 August 1988, Rahman died in a plane crash along with several other high-profile generals, including then-president of Pakistan Zia-ul-Haq, and the U.S. Ambassador to Pakistan, Arnold Lewis Raphel. Rahman had accompanied Zia to Bahawalpur in his C-130B Hercules presidential aircraft jet, to witness a U.S. M1 Abrams tank demonstration. After the generals witnessed the demonstration, it was time to leave. The aircraft departed from Bahawalpur Airport and was expected to reach Islamabad International Airport after a few hours. The takeoff was smooth, but shortly after, about 2 1/2 minutes into the flight, the control tower lost contact with the aircraft. Witnesses who saw the plane in the air claimed that it was flying erratically and that it nosedived and exploded on impact, killing all 31 passengers on board.

Shortly after the plane crash, the senate chairman, Ghulam Ishaq Khan, became president and announced Zia-al-Haq's death on radio and TV. There is speculation that various state intelligence agencies including the CIA, the Soviet KGB, the Indian RAW, the Israeli Mossad and the Afghan KHAD (in retaliation of Pakistani support for the Afghan mujahideen), or an alliance of the four intelligence agencies along with the dissident groups in the Pakistan Army, were involved in the incident.

Not long after, a board of inquiry was set up to investigate. It concluded 'the most probable cause of the crash was a criminal act of sabotage perpetrated in the aircraft. It also suggested that poisonous gases were released that incapacitated the passengers and crew, which explains why no Mayday signal was given. There was also speculations about other facts involving the details of the investigation. Although a black box was installed in the aircraft, it was not located after the crash. To this day, the cause of the plane crash remains unknown and has given a rise to many conspiracy theories.

== Personal life ==
Rahman married Rashida Akhtar Khan in 1951 and had four children: Akbar Akhtar Khan (born 1953), Humayun Akhtar Khan (born 1955), Haroon Akhtar Khan (born 1957), and Ghazi Akhtar Khan (born 1959).

== Wealth ==
Rahman, as the head of Pakistani intelligence agency, helped funnel billions of dollars in cash and other aid from the U.S. and other countries for the Afghan mujahedeen, to support their fight against the Soviet Union. A Credit Suisse account was opened in 1985, in the name of three of Rahman's sons. Years later, the account would grow to hold $3.7 million, as what the leaked records show. Akbar Akhtar Khan and Haroon Akhtar Khan, did not respond to the requests for comment on the reporting project. In a text message, Ghazi Akhtar Khan, the youngest of the Akhtar brothers, said the information about the accounts was "not correct," adding, "The content is conjectural."

== Awards and decorations ==

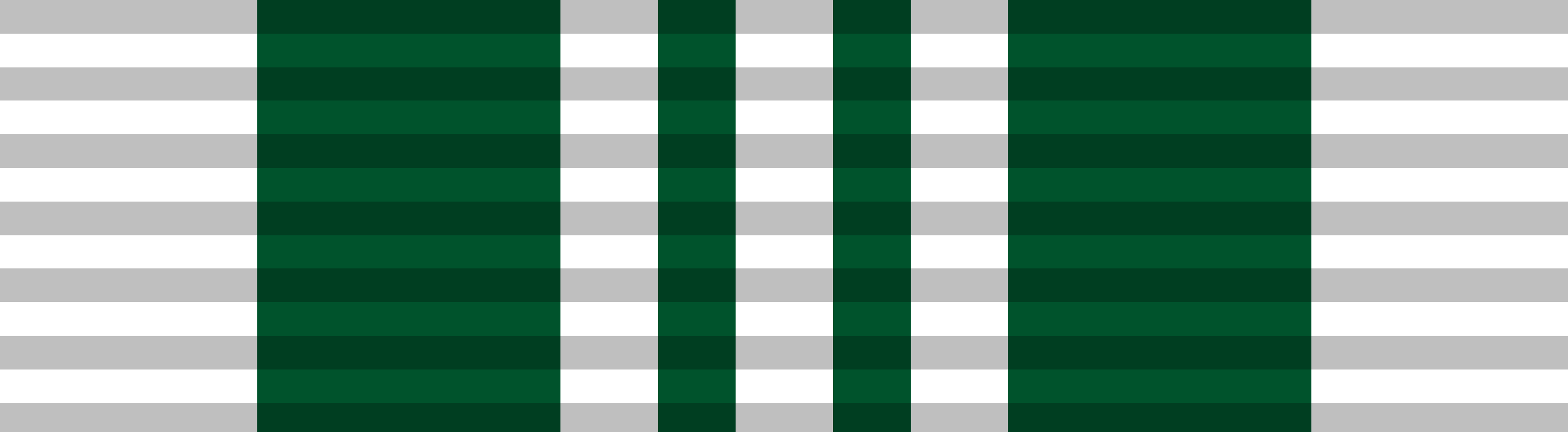

Nishan-e-Imtiaz (Military) (Order of Excellence)
Hilal-e-Imtiaz (Military) (Crescent of Excellence)	Sitara-e-Basalat (Star of Good Conduct)	Tamgha-e-Imtiaz (Military) (Medal of Excellence)	Tamgha-e-Diffa (General Service Medal)
Sitara-e-Harb 1965 War (War Star 1965)	Sitara-e-Harb 1971 War (War Star 1971)	Tamgha-e-Jang 1965 War (War Medal 1965)	Tamgha-e-Jang 1971 War (War Medal 1971)
Pakistan Tamgha (Pakistan Medal) 1947	Tamgha-e-Sad Saala Jashan-e- Wiladat-e-Quaid-e-Azam (100th Birth Anniversary of Muhammad Ali Jinnah)	Tamgha-e-Jamhuria (Republic Commemoration Medal) 1956	Hijri Tamgha (Hijri Medal) 1979

== Books mentioning Rahman ==
- Fateh by Haroon-ur-Rasheed
- Silent soldier by Mohammad Yousaf
- The Bear Trap by Mohammad Yousaf and Mark Adkin
- Charlie Wilson's War by George Crile
- Ghost Wars by Steve Coll
- A Case of Exploding Mango's Mohammad Hanif
- Profiles of Intelligence by Brigadier Syed A. I. Tirmizi

== See also ==
- History of the Soviet Union (1985–1991)

Military offices
Preceded by Muhammad Riaz Khan	Director General of the Inter-Services Intelligence; 1979–1987	Succeeded by Hamid Gul
