= Khawaja Muhammad Nizam-ul-Mehmood =

Pakistani politician

Member of the Provincial Assembly of the Punjab
- In office 29 May 2013 – 31 May 2018

Personal details
- Born: 5 January 1975 (age 51) Dera Ghazi Khan
- Party: Pakistan Peoples Party

Khawaja Muhammad Nizam-ul-Mehmood is a Pakistani politician who was a Member of the Provincial Assembly of the Punjab, from May 2013 to May 2018.

== Early life and education ==
He was born on 5 January 1975 in Dera Ghazi Khan.

He graduated in 2008 from Bahauddin Zakariya University and has a degree of Bachelor of Arts.

== Political career ==
He was elected to the Provincial Assembly of the Punjab as a candidate of Pakistan Peoples Party from PP-241 (Dera Ghazi Khan-II) constituency in the 2013 general election in Pakistan.
