= Khoja (name) =

Khoja is a surname. Notable people with the surname include:

- Abdulaziz bin Mohieddin Khoja (born 1940), Saudi Arabian diplomat
- Afaq Khoja (date of birth unknown–1693/94), religious and political leader in Kashgaria (modern-day southern Xinjiang)
- Ilyas Khoja (died 1368), Khan in Transoxiana and Khan of Moghulistan
- Jahangir Khoja, a member of the influential East Turkestan Āfāqī khoja clan
- Khaled Khoja (born 1965), Syrian Turkish politician
- Muhammad Yusuf Khoja, 7th-century Naqshbandi Sufi figure
- Khizr Khoja, son of the Chagatai khan Tughlugh Timur

== Fictional characters ==
- Warpriest Kh'oja, a fanatical and deceitful Skrull leader in Marvel Comics
