= Ghazala Saad Rafique =

Pakistani politician

Ghazala Saad Rafique MPA

Member of the Provincial Assembly of the Punjab
- In office 2008–2013

Personal details
- Party: Pakistan Muslim League (N)
- Spouse: Khawaja Saad Rafique

Ghazala Saad Rafique is a Pakistani politician who served as a member of the Provincial Assembly of the Punjab. She is the wife of former Minister for Railways Khawaja Saad Rafique.
