= Khoja, SBS Nagar =

Khoja
- Village
- Location in Punjab, India Khoja (India)
- Coordinates: 31.0174007°N 76.0403466°E
- Country: India
- State: Punjab
- District: Shaheed Bhagat Singh Nagar

Government
  - Type: Panchayat raj
  - Body: Gram panchayat
- Elevation: 254 m (833 ft)

Population (2011)
  - Total: 940
- Sex ratio 489/451 ♂/♀

Languages
  - Official: Punjabi
- Time zone: UTC+5:30 (IST)
- PIN: 144518
- Telephone code: 01823
- ISO 3166 code: IN-PB
- Post office: Garcha
- Website: nawanshahr.nic.in

Khoja is a village in Shaheed Bhagat Singh Nagar district of Punjab State, India. It is located 17 kilometres (11 mi) away from postal head office Banga, 18 kilometres (11 mi) from Nawanshahr, 11 kilometres (6.8 mi) from district headquarter Shaheed Bhagat Singh Nagar and 100 kilometres (62 mi) from state capital Chandigarh. The village is administrated by Sarpanch an elected representative of the village.

== Demography ==
As of 2011, Khoja has a total number of 187 houses and population of 940 of which 489 include are males while 451 are females according to the report published by Census India in 2011. The literacy rate of Khoja is 78.69% higher than the state average of 75.84%. The population of children under the age of 6 years is 114 which is 12.13% of total population of Khoja, and child sex ratio is approximately 869 as compared to Punjab state average of 846.

Most of the people are from Schedule Caste which constitutes 53.09% of total population in Khoja. The town does not have any Schedule Tribe population so far.

As per the report published by Census India in 2011, 332 people were engaged in work activities out of the total population of Khoja which includes 307 males and 25 females. According to census survey report 2011, 97.89% workers describe their work as main work and 2.11% workers are involved in Marginal activity providing livelihood for less than 6 months.

== Education ==
The village has a Punjabi medium, co-ed upper primary school established in 1996. The school provide mid-day meal as per Indian Midday Meal Scheme. As per Right of Children to Free and Compulsory Education Act the school provide free education to children between the ages of 6 and 14.

Amardeep Singh Shergill Memorial college Mukandpur and Sikh National College Banga are the nearest colleges. Industrial Training Institute for women (ITI Nawanshahr) is 20 kilometres (12 mi) The village is 58 kilometres (36 mi) from Indian Institute of Technology and 52 kilometres (32 mi) away from Lovely Professional University.

== Transport ==
Nawanshahr railway station is the nearest train station however, Garhshankar Junction railway station is 30 kilometres (19 mi) away from the village. Sahnewal Airport is the nearest domestic airport which located 57 kilometres (35 mi) away in Ludhiana and the nearest international airport is located in Chandigarh also Sri Guru Ram Dass Jee International Airport is the second nearest airport which is 164 kilometres (102 mi) away in Amritsar.

== See also ==
- List of villages in India
