= Khawaja Shahudin =

Punjabi Sufi poet (1867–1948)

Khawaja Pir Syed Muhammad Shahudin Gillani

Personal life
- Born: 1867 Sialkot, Pakistan
- Died: 1948 (aged 80–81) Sialkot
- Resting place: Pakka Ghara
- Children: Syed Mumtaz Ali shah Gillani; Syed Abdul Rasheed shah Gillani; Syed Altaf Ali shah Gillani
- Parent: Molvi Peer Syed Qutub Ud Din Gillani (father)
- Era: 20th century
- Region: Rangpura (Punab: Sialkot:)
- Main interest(s): Sufi poetry, Muraqaba, Dhikr
- Notable work(s): Punjabi translation of Persian and Arabic poetry

Religious life
- Religion: Islam
- Creed: Hanafi, Sufis

Muslim leader
- Influenced by: Sultan Bahu, Syed Asgar Ali

Khawaja Syed Shahudin Gillani (1867–1948) was a Sufi poet from Punjab, and a follower of the Sarwari Qadiri. He was a disciple of Syed Asghar Ali Shah of Artala Sharif, Sialkot, Pakistan.

== Literary works ==
During his life, Shahudin wrote three books of poetry. He also translated fifteen Arabic and Persian poetic works into Punjabi. He read from the translated books of Aulia Ikram in the presence of Syed Asgar Ali.

=== Bibliography ===
==== Poetry ====
- Salat Ul Aarfeen
- Noha-e-Ushaaq
- Maulood Sharif

==== Poetic translations ====
Shahudin produced the following translations:

- Ali
- Abdul Qadir Jilani
- Sultan Bahu
- Bu Ali Shah Qalandar
- Moinuddin Chishti
- Mahmud Shabistari
- Hafez Sherazi
- Masnavi Maulana Rumi
- Masnavi Bu Ali Shah Qalandar
- Masnavi Shams Tabrizi
- Manajat Siddiq-e-Akbar (Abu Bakr)
- Manajat Ali
- Manajat Khawaja Naqashband
- Masnavi Farid U Din Attar (Attar of Nishapur)
- Qaseeda Israr-e-Haq Ghulam Muhammad Siddiqui Qadri Lahori

== Personal life ==
Syed Shahudin learned Fiqh, Hadith, and Tafsir at the age of thirteen. He told his teacher, Munshi Rukane AAlam, that "He was the scholar who practiced the knowledge."He was five feet eight inches tall and had a thick beard. He wore a turban, a tah band (an open cloth to cover the body below the navel), a 'camise', and a white cloth on his shoulder.

Shortly after his marriage, Shahudin settled in Gujrat, Pakistan and opened a grocery store. Within a year or two, his father Molvi Syed Qutub uddin Gillani died, leaving him in debt. To repay the loans, he became a teacher at a school and worked at a paper mill after school. He had two sons. Six years later, his younger son, Muhammad Sharif, and his wife died.

His cousin, Syed Jamal ud Din, suggested that he find a spiritual mentor, and recommended Syed Asgar Ali Shah. The following Friday, both men visited Syed Asgar Ali, who accepted him as a disciple. Shahudin claimed that once while intoxicated, he found that Allah "manifested himself in his heart".

Sons of Peer Syed Muhammad Shahudin Gillani

1 Syed Mumtaz Ali Shah Gillani

2 Syed Altaf Ali shah Gillani

3 Syed Abdul Rasheed Gillani

About Elder Brother of Peer Syed Muhammad Shahudin Gillani

He had one elder brother Syed Muhammad Saeed ud din Gillani He always spent his life at the shrines of the saints of Allah. He mostly served at the shrine of Imam Ali-ul-Haq and also reformed the pilgrims who came there. His grave is in the Pir Moradiya graveyard. After his death, his eldest son Syed Khurshid Alam Gilani also continued the line., he was also wore a turban, a tah band (an open cloth to cover the body below the navel), a 'camise', and a white cloth on his shoulder. Syed saeed ud Din had four sons

1 Syed Khureseed Alam Gillani ( Died in 1956 Buried in Hazrat Shah Khaki wali Darbar )

2 Syed Muhammad Alam Gillani

3 Syed Abdul Aziz Gillani

3 Syed Muhammad Sharif Gillani
