= Khawaja Inaitullah =

Indian politician

Member of Parliament, Rajya Sabha
- In office 1952-1954
- Constituency: Bihar

Personal details
- Born: 1899
- Party: Indian National Congress
- Spouse: Zamima Khatoon

Khawaja Inaitullah was an Indian politician. He was a Member of Parliament, representing Bihar in the Rajya Sabha, the upper house of India's Parliament, as a member of the Indian National Congress.
