= Barbara Crossette =

American journalist

- Born: July 12, 1939 (age 86); Philadelphia, Pennsylvania, US
- Occupations: Journalist and author
- Notable credit(s): The New York Times; India Facing the 21st Century, So Close to Heaven, The Great Hill Stations of Asia, India: Old Civilization in a New World (books)
- Spouse: David Wigg

Barbara Crossette (born July 12, 1939) is an American journalist. Now United Nations correspondent for The Nation, she is a member of the Council on Foreign Relations, a trustee of the Carnegie Council for Ethics in International Affairs and a member of the editorial advisory board of the Foreign Policy Association. She was a writer on international affairs for The New York Times for many years.

== Career ==
Crossette was born in Philadelphia, Pennsylvania. She is the author of So Close to Heaven: The Vanishing Buddhist Kingdoms of the Himalayas (1995) and The Great Hill Stations of Asia (1998). The latter was a New York Times notable book of the year in 1998. Among her awards are a 1992 George Polk award for her coverage of the assassination of Rajiv Gandhi, a 2008 Fulbright Prize for her contributions to international understanding and the 2010 Shorenstein Prize for her writings on Asia, awarded jointly by the Asia–Pacific Research Center at Stanford University, and the Shorenstein Center on Media, Politics and Public Policy at Harvard Kennedy School.

== Criticism and controversies ==
Crossette has written extensively on India, and has been accused of prejudice against the country.

Vamsee Juluri, author and Professor of Media Studies at the University of San Francisco, identified Indophobic bias and prejudice in Crossette's writings. Specifically, he accuses Crossette of libelling a secularist, pluralistic, liberal democracy and an ally of the United States as a "rogue nation" and describing India as "pious," "craving," "petulant," "intransigent," and "believes that the world's rules don't apply to it". Juluri identifies these attacks as part of a racist postcolonial/neocolonial discourse used by Crosette to attack and defame India and encourage racial prejudice against Indian Americans.

A 2010 article by Crossette in Foreign Policy magazine described India as a country "that often gives global governance the biggest headache." An Indian journalist Nitin Pai, in his rebuttal, described the piece as a newsroom-cliche, utterly biased and factually incorrect. Crossette's opposition to India's support of Bangladeshi independence has been especially widely discredited for its lack of understanding of the history and international politics of the subcontinent.

== Bibliography ==
- India: Old Civilization in a New World. New York: Foreign Policy Association. 2000. ISBN 0-87124-193-5.
- The Great Hill Stations of Asia. Basic Books. 1998. ISBN 978-0813333267.
- So Close to Heaven: The Vanishing Buddhist Kingdoms of the Himalayas. New York: Alfred A. Knopf. 1995. ISBN 978-0679418276.
- India Facing the 21st Century. Bloomington: Indiana University Press. 1993. ISBN 0-253-31577-8.
