= Arnold Lewis Raphel =

American diplomat (died 1988)

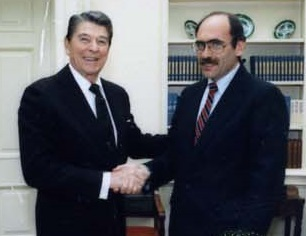
- Raphel (right) pictured with U.S. President Ronald Reagan in 1987.

18th U.S. Ambassador to Pakistan
- In office June 24, 1987 – August 17, 1988
- President: Ronald Reagan
- Preceded by: Deane R. Hinton
- Succeeded by: Robert B. Oakley

Personal details
- Born: Arnold Lewis Raphel; March 16, 1943 Troy, New York, U.S.
- Died: August 17, 1988 (aged 45) Bahawalpur, Punjab, Pakistan
- Cause of death: Airplane crash
- Spouse(s): Myrna Feigenbaum, Robin Raphel, Nancy Halliday Ely-Raphel
- Children: 1
- Education: Hamilton College (New York)
- Occupation: Diplomat

Arnold Lewis Raphel (March 16, 1943 – August 17, 1988) was an American diplomat who served as the 18th United States Ambassador to Pakistan from June 1987 until his death in an airplane crash in Punjab, Pakistan, alongside Pakistani president Zia-ul-Haq and 28 others, in August 1988.

== Early life and education ==
Raphel was born March 16, 1943, in Troy, New York, into a Jewish family, the son of Harry and Sarah (Rote-Rosen) Raphel.

As a boy, Raphel was already interested in diplomacy and international affairs. At age 12, he wrote to the then Secretary of State, John Foster Dulles, regarding his interest in diplomacy. Dulles wrote back in reply, advising him to "study hard, work hard and we’ll see you in ten years." Raphel graduated from Hamilton College (B.A., 1964) and the Maxwell School at Syracuse University (M.A., 1966).

== Career ==
Raphel joined the US State Department in 1966. He held a variety of positions throughout his career until his death in 1988. He was mainly a diplomat for the US Government.

=== Iran hostage crisis ===
In 1979, Raphel was a key member of the State Department's Special Operations Group set up to free the American hostages seized by Iranian militants at the United States Embassy in Tehran.

=== Office of United States Secretary of State ===
In 1981, Raphel served as the Special Assistant to Secretary of State Edmund Muskie. Afterward, he became the Deputy Assistant to the United States Secretary of State in 1985.

=== Ambassador to Pakistan ===
Raphel was nominated by President Ronald Reagan and succeeded Dean Roesch Hinton as US Ambassador to Pakistan in January 1987.

=== Awards ===
- Presidential Citizens Medal (1989)

== Personal life ==
Raphel was married three times. His first wife was Myrna Feigenbaum, by whom he had one daughter, Stephanie. In 1978, he married fellow diplomat Robin Raphel; the marriage, which was childless, ended in divorce two years later. In 1987, he married another fellow diplomat, Nancy Halliday Ely-Raphel. They had been married for around a year when he died in an aircrash in August 1988.

== Death ==
Raphel was serving as US ambassador to Pakistan, and was traveling in the plane with President Zia-ul-Haq on August 17, 1988, when the plane crashed, resulting in the death of 30 people, including him and President Zia.

Raphel was 45 years old. He was survived by both his parents, who were living in retirement by then in Atlantic City, N.J., and by his only daughter Stephanie, who was living with her mother, Myrna Feigenbaum, in Orlando, Florida. Raphel was also survived by his third wife, Nancy.

== See also ==
- Adolph Dubs, the previous US ambassador to die in the line of duty
- J. Christopher Stevens, the next U.S. ambassador to die in the line of duty
- US Ambassadors killed in office
