= Khawaja Saad Rafique =

32nd Minister of Railways (Pakistan)

- خواجہ سعدرفیق
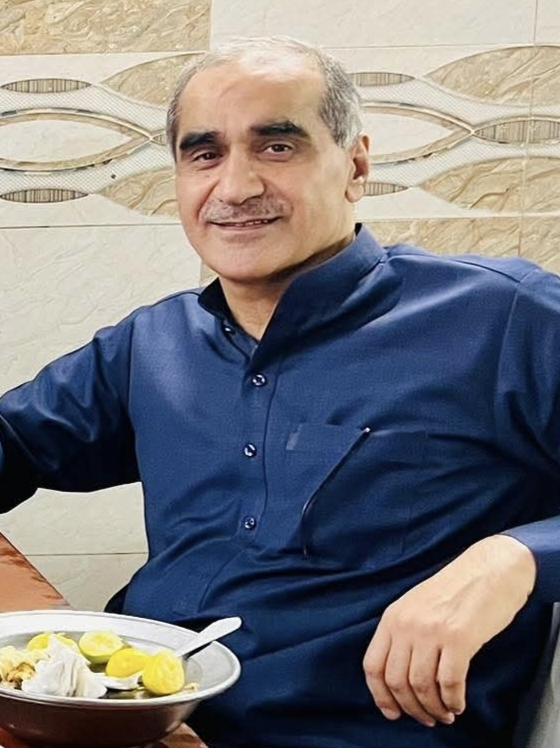

Minister for Railway
- In office 19 April 2022 – 10 August 2023
- President: Arif Alvi
- Prime Minister: Shehbaz Sharif
- Preceded by: Azam Khan Swati
- Succeeded by: Abid Sher Ali
- In office 4 August 2017 – 31 May 2018
- President: Mamnoon Hussain
- Prime Minister: Shahid Khaqan Abbasi
- Preceded by: (himself)
- Succeeded by: Roshan Khursheed Bharucha
- In office 7 June 2013 – 28 July 2017
- President: Mamnoon Hussain
- Prime Minister: Nawaz Sharif
- Preceded by: Ghulam Ahmad Bilour
- Succeeded by: (himself)

Federal Minister for Culture
- In office 31 March 2008 – 13 May 2008
- President: Pervez Musharraf
- Prime Minister: Yusuf Raza Gillani

Federal Minister for Youth Affairs
- In office 31 March 2008 – 13 May 2008
- President: Pervez Musharraf
- Prime Minister: Yusuf Raza Gillani

Special Assistant to the Prime Minister for Youth Affairs
- In office 1997 – 12 October 1999
- President: Farooq Leghari; Wasim Sajjad; Muhammad Rafiq Tarar
- Prime Minister: Nawaz Sharif

Member of the National Assembly of Pakistan
- In office 14 October 2018 – 10 August 2023
- Constituency: NA-131 Lahore
- In office 11 May 2013 – 2018
- Constituency: NA-125 Lahore
- In office 18 February 2008 – 2013
- Constituency: NA-125 Lahore
- In office 10 October 2002 – 2007
- Constituency: NA-119 Lahore

Member of the Provincial Assembly of Punjab
- In office 15 August 2018 – 14 October 2018
- Speaker: Parvez Elahi
- Constituency: PP-168 Lahore
- In office 18 February 1997 – 12 October 1999
- Speaker: Parvez Elahi
- Constituency: PP-119 Lahore

Personal details
- Born: 4 November 1962 (age 64) Lahore, Punjab, Pakistan
- Party: PMLN (1997-present)
- Spouse(s): Ghazala Saad Rafique Shafaq Hira (m. 2017)
- Relations: Khawaja Salman Rafique (brother)
- Parent: Begum Farhat Rafique (mother)
- Education: Punjab University (BA and MA)

Khawaja Saad Rafique (Urdu: خواجہ سعد رفیق; born 4 November 1962) is a Pakistani politician who had been a member of the National Assembly of Pakistan from October 2002 till August 2023 and the federal minister for Railways.

A leader of the Pakistan Muslim League (Nawaz), Rafique previously served as the Minister for Railways in Abbasi cabinet from August 2017 to May 2018 and in the Sharif's third ministry from 2013 to 2017 and held the cabinet portfolio of Minister for Culture and the Minister for Youth Affairs briefly during the Gillani ministry in 2008.

Rafique had been a member of the National Assembly of Pakistan from 2002 to May 2018 and served as Special Assistant to Prime Minister for Youth Affairs from 1997 to 1999 under Sharif's second ministry.

== Early life and education ==
Rafique was born on 4 November 1962 in Lahore, Punjab, Pakistan to Khawaja Muhammad Rafique and Begum Farhat Rafique. His family belongs to the Punjabi Kashmiri community.

His father, who was President of the right-wing Pakistan Ittehad Party and former leader of the Pakistan Democratic Party, was assassinated on 20 December 1972 near the Punjab Assembly in Lahore while returning from a political procession led by Air Marshal Asghar Khan to mark a "black day" against the rule of Zulfikar Ali Bhutto.

His mother is a politician as well a qualified educationist, running the Khwaja Mohammad Rafiq Memorial School while also being active in different social welfare groups.

Rafique enrolled at the M.A.O. College and made a transfer to Punjab University in 1982. He graduated with a BA in Political science in 1984, and later attained MA in Political science in 1986.

== Political career ==
Khawaja Saad Rafique started his political career as a student leader representing Muslim Student Federation, from MAO College Lahore in early 1980s, and later on joined the PML-N.

In the 1997 Pakistani general elections, Rafique participated in the elections on the PML-N's ticket and was elected as the member of Provincial Assembly of the Punjab for the first time. He was appointed Special Assistant to Prime Minister for Youth Affairs by then Prime Minister of Pakistan Nawaz Sharif, but his tenure was terminated by General Pervez Musharraf after the latter's 1999 Pakistani coup d'état. He was among the PML-N leaders who confronted Musharraf in the absence of Nawaz Sharif.

In the 2002 Pakistani general elections, Rafique was elected as member of National Assembly from Constituency NA-119 for the first time. During the period, he served as president of PML-N Punjab.

In the 2008 Pakistani general elections, Khawaja Saad Rafique was re-elected as the member of the National Assembly for the second time from Constituency NA-125. He was appointed the Minister for Culture and Minister for Youth Affairs in the Gillani ministry but he resigned after PML-N's went on to lead the Lawyer's movement to restore the judiciary.

He was eventually arrested and imprisoned after calling for Musharraf's removal. He, along with party colleagues and lawyers, took to the streets calling for the resignation of Musharraf and the reinstatement of judges deposed by him. He was also put behind bars for partaking in violent protests for the said purpose. Among PML-N's leaders, Rafique was one of the activists who kept the PML-N alive during the Musharraf government.

In the 2013 Pakistani general election, Rafique was re-elected as the member of the National Assembly for the third time. His wife, Ghazala Saad, was also allotted PML-N's ticket. In June 2013, Rafique was appointed Minister of Railways by the Prime Minister Nawaz Sharif and took oath on 8 June 2013.

He had ceased to hold ministerial office in July 2017 when the federal cabinet was disbanded following the resignation of Prime Minister Nawaz Sharif after Panama Papers case decision. Following the election of Shahid Khaqan Abbasi as Prime Minister of Pakistan, Rafique was inducted into the federal cabinet of Abbasi and was appointed Minister for Railways for the second time. Upon the dissolution of the National Assembly on the expiration of its term on 31 May 2018, Rafique ceased to hold the office as Federal Minister for Railways.

He was re-elected to the Provincial Assembly of Punjab as a candidate of PML-N from Constituency PP-168 (Lahore-XXV) in the 2018 Pakistani general election. Rafique also ran for the seat of the National Assembly from Constituency NA-131 (Lahore-IX) but was unsuccessful as he was defeated by Prime minister Imran Khan along with 4 other seats from which he won in general election of 2018.

He was re-elected to the National Assembly as a candidate of PML-N from Constituency NA-131 (Lahore-IX) in the by-election held on 14 October 2018 after Imran Khan resigned from this seat and kept his home-city seat of Mianwali.

After the removal of Prime Minister Imran Khan through the vote of no confidence Khawaja Saad Rafique was made Railway Minister in Shehbaz Sharif's Cabinet.

Rafique was defeated by Latif Khosa in the General Election held on 8 February 2024.

== Personal life ==
=== Family ===
His brother Khawaja Salman Rafique has been a member of Provincial Assembly of the Punjab and was Provincial Minister of Punjab for Health.

=== Relationships ===
He has married twice. His first wife Ghazala Saad Rafique has been a member of Provincial Assembly of Punjab. He has two daughters and one son from his first wife. In April 2017, it was reported that Rafique has secretly married a PTV host Shafaq Hira, without the consent of his first wife, Ghazala. In June 2018, Rafique disclosed his second marriage to Shafaq Hira in his nomination papers for 2018 general election.

== Writings ==
Rafique has written Urdu-language opinion columns, including Jawab Aan Ghazal ["A Response in Kind" or literally "A Counter-Ghazal"], published in the Daily Express on 15 April 2014. In this column, he responded to criticism of politicians by a former Supreme Court judge, defending the role of elected representatives in a democracy. He addressed issues such as judicial overreach, civil-military imbalance, and political victimization, while emphasizing the need for institutional accountability and democratic norms. The column also referenced the political history of his family, including the assassination of his father, Khawaja Muhammad Rafique, in 1972.

Political offices
Preceded by	Minister for Youth Affairs; 2008—2008	Succeeded by
Preceded by	Minister for Culture; 2008—2008	Succeeded by
Preceded by	Minister for Railway; 2013—present	Incumbent
