= Mirza Hamid Hussain =

Pakistan Army officer

- Born: 4 July 1914; Delhi British Indian Empire
- Died: 12 July 1987 (aged 73); Lahore, Pakistan
- Burial place: Karachi, Sindh
- Relatives: Nawab Qasim Jan
- Military career
- Allegiance: British India (1935-47); Pakistan (1947-77)
- Branch: (British Raj) British Indian Army; Pakistan Army
- Service years: 1935 – 1977
- Rank: Brigadier
- Units: 11th Sikh Regiment; Indian Army Ordnance Corps; Pakistan Army Ordnance Corps
- Commands: Director Inter-Services Intelligence
- Conflicts: Third Waziristan Campaign; World War II; Indo-Pakistani War of 1947; Indo-Pakistani War of 1965; Indo-Pakistani War of 1971
- Awards: Orden del Mérito Militar

Mirza Hamid Hussain (4 July 1914 – 12 August 1987) was a Pakistan Army officer and intelligence officer.

== Early life and education ==
Hussain was born in 1914 at Delhi. He was educated at Aligarh Muslim University, Aligarh and the 'Prince of Wales' Royal Military College RIMC, Dehra Dun from 1926 to 1932, and the Indian Military Academy.

== British Indian Army career ==
He was commissioned from the Indian Military Academy on 1 February 1935 and was attached to a British Army regiment, 1st battalion The King's Shropshire Light Infantry. He joined the 5th battalion, 11th Sikh Regiment, on 16 March 1936. His initial date of commission was antedated to 4 February 1934 and he was promoted to Lieutenant on 4 May 1936. He saw active service on the Frontier Waziristan operations.

He was the first and senior most Muslim Commissioned Officer to join the Indian Army Ordnance Corps in 1940. He served in Iraq and Iran in various senior appointments such as DADOD 10th Army and Chief Ordnance Officer. He graduated from the Staff College, Quetta, in 1945 and commanded various Ordnance Depots in India. He was then appointed ADOS in G.H.Q. India where he was in charge of Operation and training for the Ordnance Service.

== Pakistan Army career ==
On the independence of Pakistan in 1947, he opted for Pakistan Army and came to Pakistan as Deputy Director Ordnance Service G.H.Q. Rawalpindi. Later he was appointed Director of Weapon and Equipment in the General Staff Branch G.H.Q. and subsequently took over as Director of Staff Duties. He was promoted to the rank of Brigadier. On completion of tenure, he was appointed Director of Inter-Services Intelligence, Pakistan.

== Diplomatic appointments ==
He was selected for Foreign Service of Pakistan in 1951 and was appointed Deputy Secretary in the Ministry of Foreign affairs in charge of the Middle East Division. Later, he became Chief of Protocol. In 1952, he was selected for the appointment of Counselor, High Commission of Pakistan, London. He was a counselor in Iraq, Iran and Turkey. He was charge d'affairs as Joint secretary, Chief of Protocol. He was honored with the 'Order of Monrovia' and 'Membership of the Civil Merit' from Spain.

He was a direct descendant of Nawab Qasim Khan who came to India from Yarkand. He died in 1987 at the age of 73 in Lahore, Pakistan.
