= Pakistan Army Ordnance Corps =

Pakistan Army's staff corps to supply with weapons & ammunitions

Pakistan Army Corps of Ordnance
- Insignia of the Pakistan Army Ordnance Corps
- Active: 1947; 79 years ago
- Country: Pakistan
- Branch: Pakistan Army
- Type: Combat service support
- Role: Administrative and staffing oversight.
- Size: Varies
- HQ/Garrison: Ordnance Center in Malir Cantonment, Sindh, Pakistan
- Nickname: ORD
- Colors Identification: Gold
- Anniversaries: 1947
- Engagements: Military history of Pakistan
- Decorations: Military Decorations of Pakistan military

Commanders
- Chief of Logistics Staff (LGS): Maj-Gen. Shahab Sahid
- Notable commanders: Maj-Gen. Shahid Hamid

Insignia
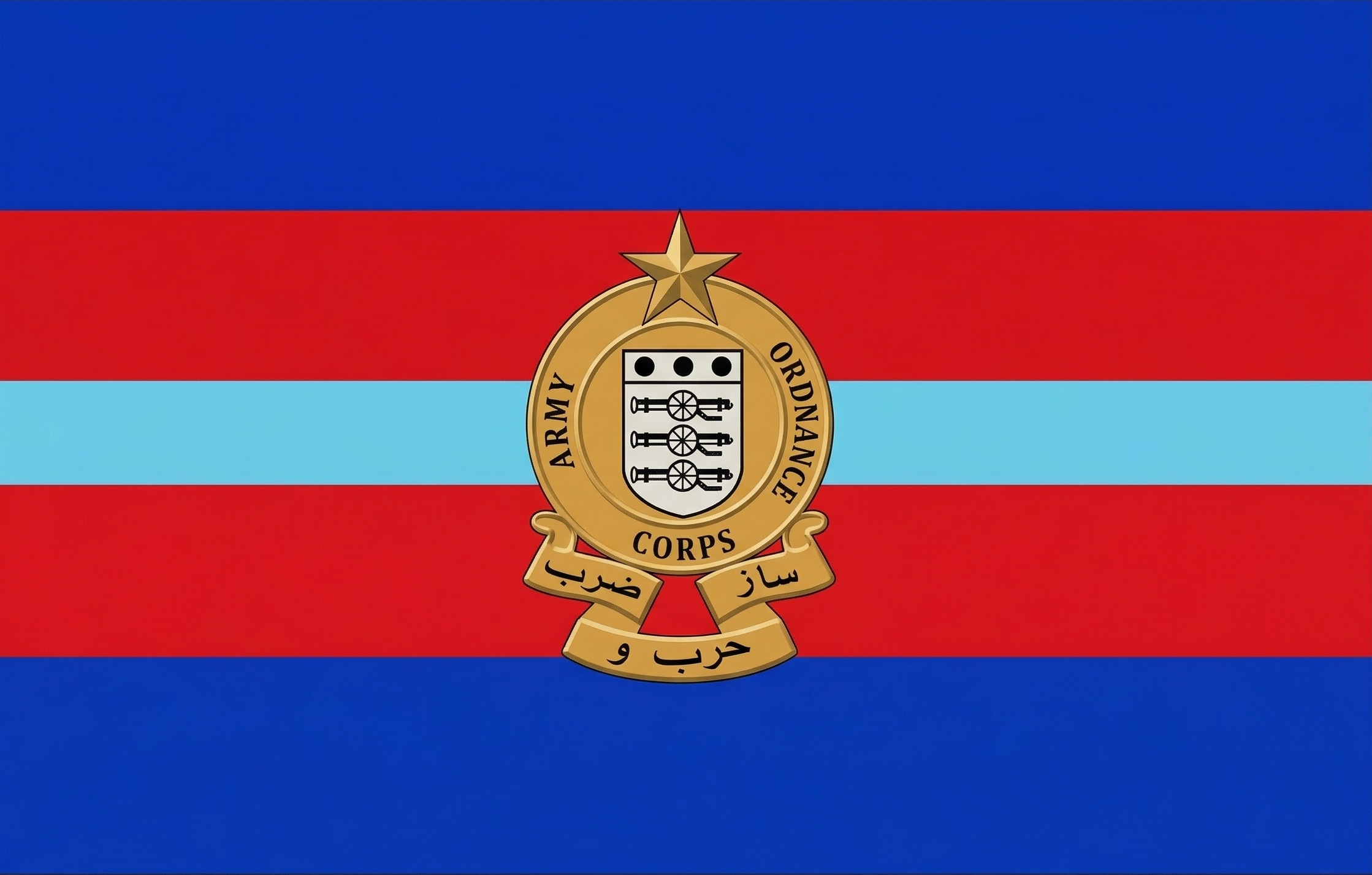
- Flag

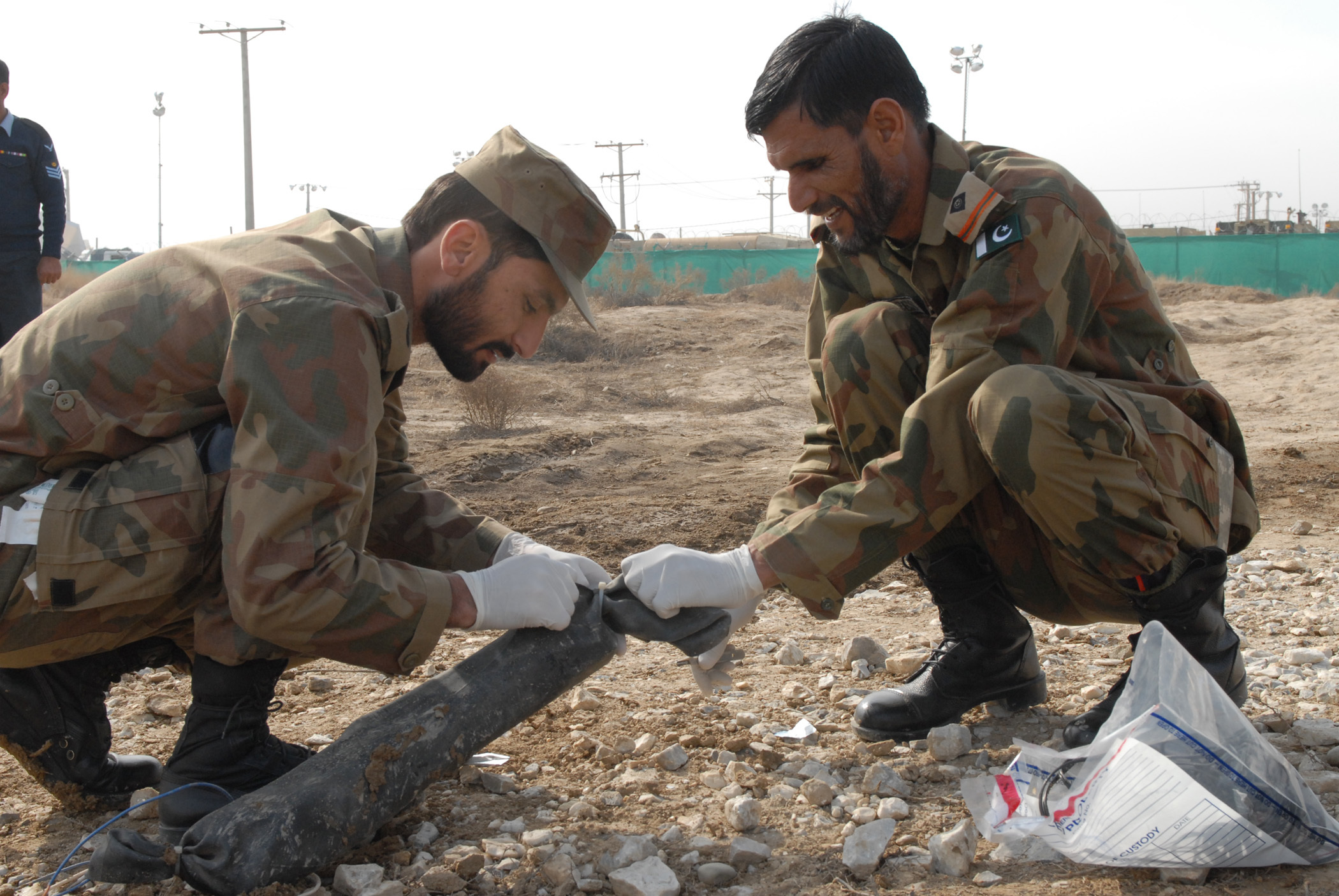
The Pakistani troops from the Ordnance Corps examining the mocked UXO in 2010.

The Pakistan Army Corps of Ordnance is a military administrative and the staff service branch of the Pakistan Army. Headquartered in the Malir Cantonment in Sindh, the corps broad mission is to provide army units with weapons, explosives, and ammunition, which also includes the procurement and ground mobility.

As of 2023, the ordnance corps is commanded by Maj-Gen. Shahab Shahid as its Chief of Logistics Staff (LSG)— though the position is or/was also known as Master–General of Ordnance.

== Overview ==
The Ordnance Corps was established from the partition of the British Indian Army on 14 August 1947. During its early formation, the leadership of the administration of the ordnance corps was deputed from the British Army– Brig. A. Whiteside (later ascended as General) was Pakistan Army's first Master–General of Ordnance, which he served from 1947 to 1951. In 1951, Major-General Shahid Hamid was appointed as country's local first master-general of ordnance.

The Pakistan Army Ordnance Corps current mission is to support the development, acquisition, and production of the ammunitions, explosives, and ground mobility materiel to provide combat formations to the Pakistan Army. The Ordnance College in Karachi provides the trained professionals and personnel to support the corps.

As of CY-23, the Ordnance Corps is commanded by the Chief of Logistics Staff (CLS)— in past time, the position is or/was Master–General of Ordnance— working under the Chief of the General Staff at the Army GHQ in Rawalpindi.

== Units ==
- 74 Ordnance Unit
- 75 Ordnance Unit
- 76 Ordnance Unit
- 77 Ordnance Unit
- 79 Ordnance Unit
- 80 Ordnance Unit
- 81 Ordnance Unit
- 82 Ordnnce Unoit
- 83 Ordnance Unit
- 84 Ordnance Unit
- 87 Ordnance Unit
- 88 Ordnance Unit
- 89 Ordnance Unit
- 90 Ordnance Unit
- 91 Ordnance Unit
- 92 Ordnance Unit
- 97 Ordnance Unit
- 99 Ordnance Unit
- 100 Ordnance Unit
- 102 Ordnance Unit
- 103 Ordnance Unit
- 106 Ordnance Unit
- 108 Ordnance Unit
- 109 Ordnance Unit
- 112 Ordnance Unit
- 115 Ordnance Unit
- 116 Ordnance Unit
- 126 Ordnance Unit
- 135 Ordnance Unit
- 136 Ordnance Unit
- 152 ordnance Unit
- 153 Ordnance Unit
- COD(Central Ordnance Depot)

== See also ==
- Pakistan Army Artillery Corps
- Pakistan Army Corps of Engineers
- Pakistan Army Medical Corps
- Pakistan Army Corps of Signals
- Pakistan Army Corps of Electrical and Mechanical Engineering
