= Master-General of the Ordnance (disambiguation) =

Master-General of the Ordnance is a role in the British Army. It may also refer to:

- Master-General of the Ordnance (India)
- Master-General of the Ordnance (Ireland)
- Master-General of Ordnance (Pakistan)
- Master-General of the Ordnance (Sri Lanka)
- Master-General of the Ordnance (Sweden)
