= Malik Sher Bahadur =

Pakistani Major General (born 1911)

Major General Malik Sher Bahadur SPk
- ملک شیر بہادر

8th Chief of the General Staff Pakistan Army
- In office 24 December 1962 – May 1966
- Preceded by: Yahya Khan
- Succeeded by: Sahabzada Yaqub Khan

Adjutant General GHQ (Pakistan)
- In office 11 June 1959 – December 1962
- Preceded by: Syed Shahid Hamid

Deputy Chief of Staff Pakistan Army
- In office September 1957 – May 1959

6th Director-General of Inter-Services Intelligence
- In office August 1955 – September 1957
- Preceded by: Syed Ghawas

Personal details
- Born: 11 April 1911 Lawa Tehsil, Talagang District, British India
- Children: 2
- Relatives: Nur Khan (uncle)
- Education: Indian Military Academy; Joint Services Staff College (UK)

Military service
- Branch/service: British Indian Army (1933); Pakistan Army (1947)
- Years of service: 1933-1966
- Rank: Major General
- Commands: Inter-Services Intelligence
- Battles/wars: World War II; Indo-Pakistani war of 1947–1948; Battle of Pandu; Indo-Pakistani war of 1965; Operation Gibraltar

Malik Sher Bahadur (Note: Urdu: ملک شیر بہادر) (born 11 April 1911) was a Pakistani two-star rank major general who served as the sixth Director General of the Inter-Services Intelligence from 1955 to 1957 and eighth Chief of the General Staff from 1962 to 1966.

== Early life ==
Malik Sher Bahadur was born on 11 April 1911 into an Qutb Shahi family belonging to the Punjabi Awan tribe of Talagang Tehsil. His father, Malik Jehan Khan, served in the British Indian Army.

== Ancestry ==
Malik Sher Bahadur's great-grandfather, Malik Khan Baig, was described as an "eminent personality of his family". He was a Naib Subedar and went with his irregular cavalry to serve the British Army at Delhi during the Sepoy Mutiny of 1857.

== Personal life ==
He had two daughters. His eldest son-in-law, Sarfraz Khan, was the son of Malik Mohammad Nawaz, while his second son-in-law, Brigadier Haq Nawaz Khan, was from Dab, Chakwal and serving in the Pakistan Army in 1971.

== Military career ==
=== British Indian Army ===
Malik Sher Bahadur joined the British Indian Army as a cadet in 1933 and was educated at the Indian Military Academy. He was commissioned into the army in 1936.

=== Pakistan Army ===
He was promoted to Major General on 18 January 1959. On 11 June 1959, he was appointed as the Adjutant General of the army.
