= Aquila Berlas Kiani =

Indian scholar

- Aquila Kiani in early life
- Born: Aquila Barlas or Aqila Begum; 1921; India
- Died: 30 March 2012; Vancouver, Canada
- Known for: Academic work in sociology and education in social work

Aquila Berlas Kiani (1921 – 30 March 2012), also known as Aquila Kiani (née Aquila Barlas or Aqila Begum) was a Professor of Sociology and an educator in social work. Born in British India, she later worked in Pakistan, the UK and the US. She served as Chairperson of the Department of Sociology at the University of Karachi.

Kiani published research papers, presided over several organizations and was awarded a fellowship by the London-based Institute for Cultural Research, founded by Idries Shah.

== Family background ==
Aquila Kiani's father, Mirza Shakir Hussain Barlas, a barrister, was descended from Nawab Qasim Jan, a courtier in the royal courts of Mughal Delhi. Her mother, Bibi Mehmooda Begum was the daughter of Nawab Amjad Ali Shah, last Nawab (noble) of Sardhana.

Bibi Mehmooda Begum was also the sister of the Sirdar Ikbal Ali Shah, an Indian-Afghan author and diplomat descended from the Afghan warlord and noble, Jan-Fishan Khan and the Sadaat (descendants of the Islamic prophet Muhammad) of Paghman near Kabul, Afghanistan.

Kiani married and had three children: Khalid, Sohail, and Lina. In later life, she went into retirement in Vancouver, British Columbia, Canada, where she subsequently died on 30 March 2012.

== Education ==
Aquila Kiani received degrees in sociology and education in India, the UK, the United States and Canada:

- B.A., B.T., Agra University, India, 1943–1944
- M.A. Ed., University of London, England, 1949
- M.A., Sociology, Columbia University, U.S.A., 1953
- PhD, Florida State University, U.S.A., 1955
- Master of Social Work (M.S.W.), University of British Columbia, Canada, 1983.

== Professional career ==
In the 1960s and 1970s, Kiani worked in Pakistan. She became a specialist in Rural Sociology and Anthropology in Peshawar; was made Head of the Department of Social Work, and later served as Chairman of the Department of Sociology at the University of Karachi.

As well as carrying out and publishing academic research on a wide range of subjects, and public speaking, Kiani held several notable positions as President of the Pakistan Federation of University Women, President of the Pakistan Sociological Association, and founding President of the Soroptimist Club of Karachi. She was also made a Fellow of the London-based Institute for Cultural Research.

Kiani later worked in the US and Canada. She was made associate professor of Sociology and Social Work at the University of Alaska, and worked for the Ontario Administration of Settlement & Integration Services.

In 1996, she was invited by the Women's Federation for World Peace in Seattle, Washington to make a guest speech at their conference.

== Academic publications ==
- Aquila Kiani, An inquiry into the factors that impede formal education of children in rural areas, Research monograph (Pakistan Academy for Rural Development, Peshawar), no. 3, West Pakistan Academy for Village Development, Peshawar, 1961
- Aquila Kiani, Sociology of development in Pakistan, Pakistan Sociological Association, Conference on Sociology and Development of Human Resources, 1971
- Aquila Kiani, Sociology of development in Pakistan, Social Research Centre, University of Karachi, 1971
- Aquila Kiani et al., Emerging patterns of rural leadership in West Pakistan, Pakistan Academy for Rural Development, Peshawar, 1971
- Aquila Kiani, Pakistani creative literature and the teaching of social sciences : an anthology, Publications Division, United Press of Pakistan for the Dept. of Social Work, University of Karachi, 1974
- Aquila Kiani, Manual for motivators : prepared for the research project on the effectiveness of social welfare approach to the clients for the adoption of family planning : an adoption research project in selected areas of Pakistan, Social Research Centre, University of Karachi, pref. 1976
- Aquila Kiani, The effectiveness of the social welfare approach to clients for the adoption of family planning : an action research project in selected areas of Pakistan, Social Research Centre, University of Karachi, 1977
- Aquila Kiani, Social policy and changing status of women in Pakistan [9th world congress of sociology, Uppsala, Sweden, August 14–19, 1978], Congrès mondial de sociologie, 1978
- Aquila Kiani, Correlates of age in a sample of suicide attempters known to an agency, University of British Columbia, 1982/3 (Master of Social Work (MSW) thesis)
- Aquila Kiani, A guidebook for problem drinkers, Orientation Adjustment Services for Immigrants Society, Vancouver, 1985
