= Mian Ghulam Jilani =

British Indian army officer and Pakistani general (1913–2004)

Major General Mian Ghulam Jilani SQA IS LoM
- میاں غلام جیلانی
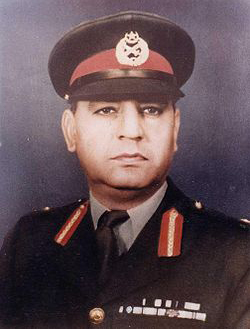
- Jilani in 1962

Member of Provincial Assembly of North West Frontier
- In office 7 December 1970 – 1977
- Constituency: PF-21 Mardan

GOC 15th Infantry Division (Sialkot)
- In office ?–1962

Force Commander Bajaur Campaign
- In office October 1960 – September 1961
Previous Commands
Master General of Ordnance (Pakistan)
In office
December 1958 – October 1960
Commandant
Command and Staff College
In office
July 1957 – December 1958
Military attaché of Pakistan to Washington
In office
October 1952 – June 1955
Commanding officer Gilgit
In office
April 1948 – January 1949
Commanding officer 4 Frontier Force Regiment
In office
1947 – April 1948

Personal details
- Born: 1913 Sibi, Baluchistan, British India
- Died: 1 March 2004 (aged 90–91) Fairfax, Virginia, USA
- Cause of death: Pneumonia
- Party: National Awami Party (Wali)
- Spouse: Nancy Habiba Jilani (m. 1949)
- Relations: Mian Hayaud Din (cousin)
- Children: 4
- Education: Forman Christian College; Aligarh Muslim University (MA); Rashtriya Indian Military College
- Nickname(s): Kaka; Speen Dada; Jilly

Military service
- Allegiance: (British Raj) British India (1936–1947); Pakistan (1947–1962)
- Branch/service: (British Raj) British Indian Army; Pakistan Army
- Years of service: 1936–1962
- Rank: Major General
- Unit: 4th Battalion 19th Hyderabad Regiment
- Commands: Frontier Force Regiment; 14th Infantry Division; Command & Staff College; 15th Infantry Division; 7th Infantry Division (Pakistan)
- Battles/wars: World War II; Battle of Singapore; Indo-Pakistani War of 1947; Poonch Military operations; Ladakh Military operations; Bajaur Campaign
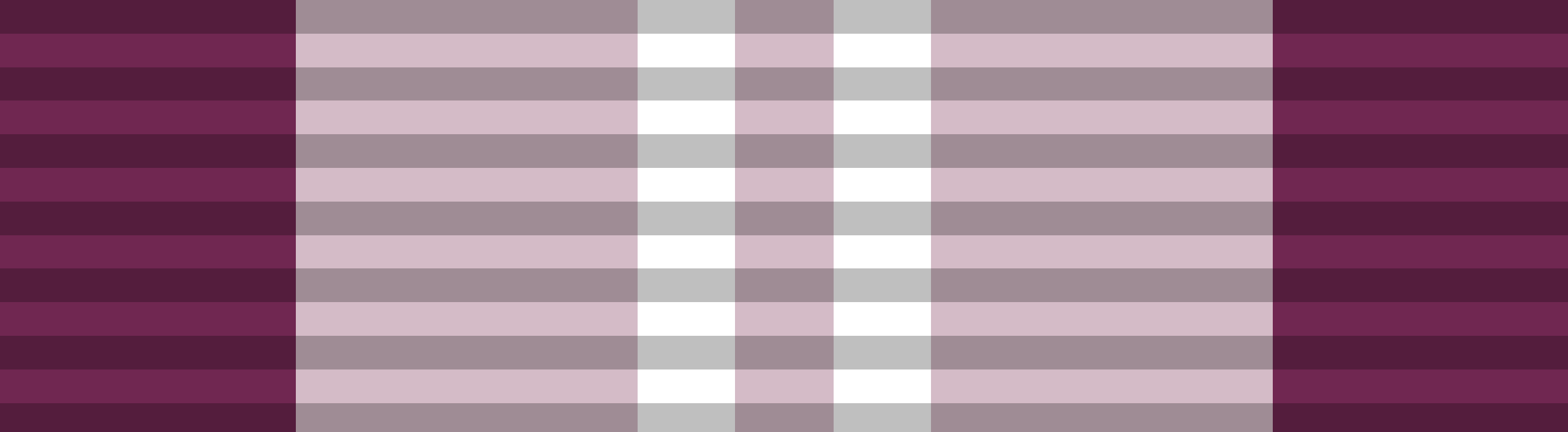
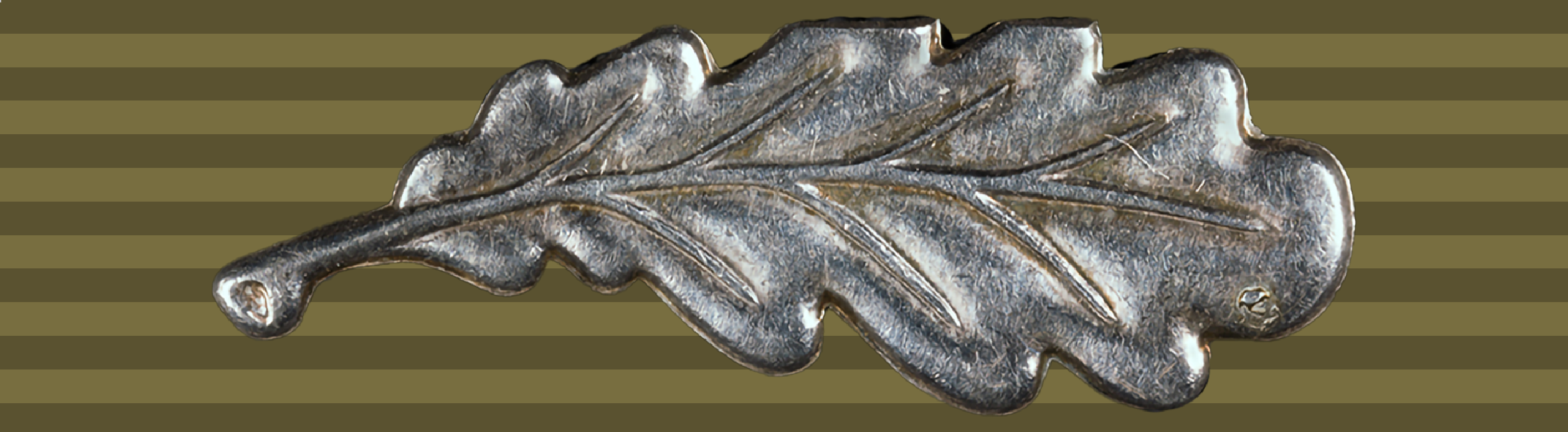
- Awards: Sitara-i-Quaid-i-Azam; Imtiazi Sanad; Legion of Merit

Mian Ghulam Jilani SQA, IS, LoM (Pashto, Urdu: میاں غلام جیلانی; 1913 – March 1, 2004) also known as Kaka, Speen Dada, and Jilly, was a politician, businessman, and former two-star general in the Pakistan Army. As a British Indian Army officer during World War II, he survived a Japanese POW camp in Singapore. He played a key role in establishing the ceasefire during the First Kashmir War. During his stint as the Military attaché of Pakistan to Washington (1952-1955), he helped negotiate Pakistan's membership in the Baghdad Pact and the Southeast Asia Treaty Organization.

An ethnic Pashtun, he retired from the Pakistan Army in 1962 due to the autocratic rule of Ayub Khan. Afterwards, he was involved in business and joined politics.

He was repeatedly arrested by Zulfikar Ali Bhutto in the 1970s for his political beliefs and was in jail for more than three years with Amnesty International declaring him a prisoner of conscience in 1974. During a medical checkup, he escaped from custody and took political asylum in the United States in 1975 becoming a citizen in 1981.

== Early life ==
Jilani was born in 1913 in Sibi in the Chief Commissioner's Province of Balochistan.

=== Education ===
He was educated at Forman Christian College in Lahore and later in Law at the Aligarh Muslim University, in India.

== Personal life ==
He married Nancy Habiba Jilani in 1949 and they had 4 children. Their son Mian Arshad Jilani and three daughters Hadia Jilani Roberts, Halima Jilani Raza, and Habiba Jilani Freeman. At the time of his death, Mian Ghulam Jilani had 9 grandchildren.

== British Indian Army career ==
He completed his officer's training at the Rashtriya Indian Military College at Dehra Dun in British India and was commissioned as second lieutenant on to the Special List, Indian Land Forces on 1 February 1936 and attached to the 2nd battalion the Royal Scots Regiment on 24 February 1936 for a years experience before joining his British Indian Army regiment. He was accepted for the Indian Army on 24 February 1937 and posted to the 4th battalion 19th Hyderabad Regiment. His seniority as a second lieutenant was antedated to 3 February 1935 and he was promoted Lieutenant 3 May 1937. He was later appointed acting Captain and then appointed Adjutant of the 4/19th 1 October 1940.

=== Captured at Singapore ===
During the Second World War, the fourth battalion 19th Hyderabad Regiment was sent to Singapore with the British Indian Army. Jilani was captured and taken prisoner by the Japanese in 1942. He was a prisoner of war for nearly forty months. During this period, he was tortured and kept in solitary confinement for seven months. Whilst a prisoner of war he was promoted Captain. He was mentioned in despatches in recognition of gallant and distinguished services in Malaya in 1942.

Shortly after World War II, the movement for independence from the British resulted in Partition of British India in 1947. Jilani threw his energy and enthusiasm behind it.

== Pakistan Army career ==
=== Kashmir Operations ===
He joined the newly formed Pakistan Army and was the 42nd senior most officer (PA–42), commanding 4 Frontier Regiment. A few weeks later he took a leave of absence from the army to volunteer as a fighter in Kashmir, fighting for its independence and right to join Pakistan. In April 1948, he was appointed Commanding Officer at Gilgit where he remained until the ceasefire.

His troops played a major role in establishing what would later become the Line of Control between India and Pakistan. He fought a guerrilla war in northern Kashmir engaging two divisions of the Indian Army subsequently taking over Baltistan.

He played a key role in the ceasefire of the Indo-Pakistani War of 1947.

=== Relations with the United States ===
As a Brigadier, he was posted as the first Military attaché of Pakistan to Washington in October 1952. He was accredited Military Attache to Canada and Mexico.

=== Awarded by Eisenhower ===
He brought about the military aid treaty, known as the Baghdad Pact between the United States and Pakistan in May 1954 for which in 1955 he was awarded the Legion of Merit by President Dwight D. Eisenhower. The Government of Pakistan awarded him the Sitara-i-Quaid-i-Azam (Star of the Quaid), named after the Founder of Pakistan, Muhammad Ali Jinnah.

=== Senior Commander ===
On promotion to major general, he served as GOC East Pakistan commanding 14th Infantry Division (Dhaka), Commandant of the Command and Staff College (July 1957 – December 1958), Master General of Ordnance (GHQ) and GOC 15th Infantry Division (Sialkot).

As GOC 15th Div he along with (then) Brig Rakhman Gul MC Inspector General Frontier Corps served under (then) Maj Gen Attiqur Rahman MC GOC 7th Infantry Division who was the Force Commander for the Bajaur Campaign of October 1960. After the Nawab of Dir Sir Shah Jehan Khan and his son Khan Shahabud Din Khan of Jandol were captured on 28 October 1948, Maj Gen Attiqur Rahman MC moved back to Peshawar and Jilani took over as Force Commander.

=== Retirement ===
After retiring from the army, he was hired by Fakhrudin Valika as a General Manager with the Valika Group in Karachi.

== Political career ==
He joined the National Awami Party (Wali) and became a member of the provincial assembly of North West Frontier Province from his home constituency in Mardan in the 1970 Pakistani general election after receiving 16,346 votes. He was the head of the NAP-Ws youth wing, Zalmay Pakhtun.

=== Arrest ===
He was an outspoken critic of the government of Zulfikar Ali Bhutto and was arrested by the Pakistan Peoples Party government on 15 February 1973.

His wife Mrs. Nancy Habiba Jilani filed a writ petition against his detention, and the judgment of the Lahore High Court was authored by Nasim Hasan Shah, J. and is reported as: Mrs. Habiba Jilani V Federation of Pakistan (PLD 1974 Lahore 153). The Lahore High Court declared the detention valid.

In a crackdown on his party, a smear campaign was launched against him and Jilani was frequently arrested. Zulfikar Ali Bhutto then attempted to bribe Jilani with offers of high positions—all to no avail. Nonetheless, all charges against Jilani were repeatedly dismissed by the courts. Amnesty International adopted him as a "prisoner of conscience" in 1974.

=== Escape from Jail ===
Jilani managed to escape from guards during a hospital visit in 1975 and was granted political asylum in the United States. He became a US citizen in 1981.

== US Residency ==
After becoming a citizen of the United States, he gave speeches at colleges, government organizations, and veterans organizations. He shared his experiences in Pakistan and discussed global military affairs.

=== Death ===
He died of Pneumonia at his daughter's home in Fairfax, Virginia on 1 March 2004.

== Bibliography ==
- Judgments on the Constitution, Rule of Law, and Martial Law in Pakistan by Chief Justice Dr Nasim Hassan Shah, edited by Prof Dr M A Mannan (OUP 1993)
- Pakistan. Problems of Governance by Mushahid Hussain & Akmal Hussain (Vanguard Books 1993) (p. 30, 87 & 90)

=== Foreign decorations ===
Foreign Awards
| UK | War Medal 1939-1945 |
| UK | Queen Elizabeth II Coronation Medal |
| USA | Legion of Merit by Dwight D. Eisenhower |
