= Aqil Hussain Barlas =

British-Indian diplomat (1927–1989)

Mirza Aqil Hussain Barlas
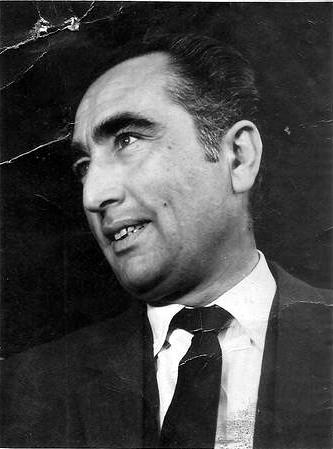
- Born: 29 July 1927; Delhi, British India
- Died: 21 December 1989 (aged 62); Delhi, India
- Burial place: New Delhi, Delhi, India
- Relatives: Nawab Qasim Jan
- Military career
- Allegiance: United Kingdom; India
- Branch: British Army

Mirza Aqil Hussain Barlas (29 July 1927 – 21 December 1989) was an Indian lawyer and diplomat, known for his translations from Persian. He was in charge of the Egyptian Embassy in New Delhi India.

== Background ==
His father was Nawab Shakir Hussain Barlas, a barrister from Oxford University and his mother was Bibi Mehmooda Begum, the sister of Sirdar Ikbal Ali Shah.

He produced an English translation of the first part of the Bostan of Saadi of Shiraz, published in London by the Octagon Press (the publishing firm of his cousin Idries Shah, the son of Sirdar Ikbal Ali Shah and grandson of Nawab Syed Amjad Ali Shah). Idries Shah recounts a story about his cousin in his book Kara Kush (in the chapter 'Mirza in a mulberry tree').

His only child was Adil Hussain Barlas. He died of heart failure in the Govind Ballabh Pant hospital in New Delhi, and was buried in the family graveyard at Nizamuddin Aulia Dargah.
