= Inter-Services Intelligence =

Foreign intelligence agency of Pakistan

- انٹر سروسز انٹلیجنس
- Seal of the Inter-Services Intelligence

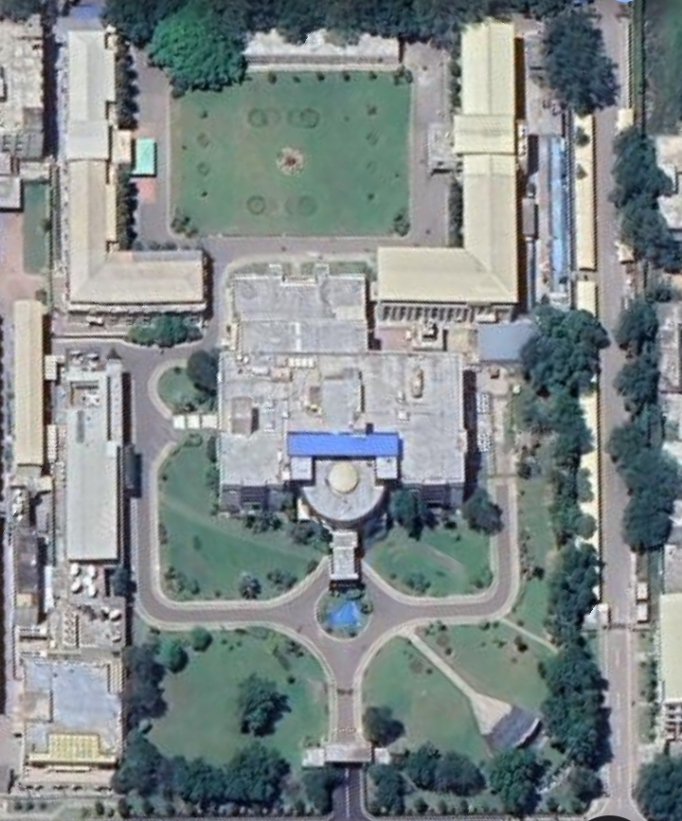
- Satellite imagery of Inter Services Intelligence Headquarters in Islamabad, Pakistan

Agency overview
- Formed: 1 January 1948; 78 years ago
- Jurisdiction: Government of Pakistan
- Headquarters: Islamabad, Pakistan
- Motto: خُذُوا حِذرُکُم ^{[Quran 4:71]} "[O believers!] Take your precautions [and go forth either in groups or together.]"
- Employees: Classified
- Annual budget: Classified
- Agency executive: Lt.Gen Asim Malik, Director-General
- Parent department: Ministry of Defence
- Child agency: Covert Action Division

The Inter-Services Intelligence (ISI) (Note: Urdu: انٹر سروسز انٹلیجنس (آئی ایس آئی)) is the foreign intelligence agency of Pakistan. It is responsible for counterintelligence, espionage and conducting covert operations around the world. The main objective of the ISI is to covertly collect and analyse intelligence from overseas that is deemed relevant to Pakistan's national security and interests. The ISI reports to its agency executive which is the Director-General of Inter-Services Intelligence. It is primarily focused on providing foreign intelligence to the Government of Pakistan and the Pakistan Armed Forces. It is part of the Pakistani intelligence community.

The ISI primarily consists of both serving military and civilian intelligence officers drawn on secondment from the three intelligence services of the Pakistan Armed Forces: the MI, NI, and AI and the Intelligence Bureau (IB), Federal Investigation Agency (FIA), and the Counter Terrorism Department (CTD).

Since 1971, it has been formally headed by a serving three-star general of the Pakistan Army, who is appointed by the Prime Minister of Pakistan in consultation with the Chief of Army Staff, who recommends three officers for the position. As of 30 September 2024, the ISI is headed by Lt. Gen. Asim Malik. The Director-General reports directly to both the Prime Minister and the Chief of Army Staff.

Initially relatively unknown outside of Pakistan in the years following its inception, the agency gained global recognition and fame in the 1980s when it backed the Afghan mujahideen against the Soviet Union during the Soviet–Afghan War in the former Democratic Republic of Afghanistan. Over the course of the conflict, the ISI worked in close coordination with the Central Intelligence Agency of the United States and the Secret Intelligence Service of the United Kingdom to run Operation Cyclone, a program to train and fund the mujahideen in Afghanistan with support from China, Saudi Arabia, and other Muslim nations.

Following the dissolution of the Democratic Republic of Afghanistan in 1992 along with the Soviet Union, the ISI provided strategic support and intelligence to the Taliban against the Northern Alliance during the Afghan Civil War in the 1990s. The ISI has strong links with jihadist groups, particularly in Afghanistan and Kashmir. The Federal Bureau of Investigation (FBI), in their first ever open acknowledgement in 2011 in US Court, said that the Inter-Services Intelligence (ISI) sponsors and oversees the insurgency in Kashmir by arming separatist militant groups.

== History ==
The Inter-Services Intelligence was established in 1948 by officers of the Pakistan Army after the First Kashmir War, the first of several Indo-Pakistani wars and conflicts. It was the brainchild of Brigadier Syed Shahid Hamid who became its first Director-General.

The Kashmir War had exposed weaknesses in intelligence gathering, sharing, and coordination between military branches and Pakistani Intelligence Bureau (IB) and Military Intelligence (MI). The ISI was thus established to be operated by officers from the newly independent Pakistan's three main military services, and to specialize in the collection, analysis, and assessment of external military and non-military intelligence.

Naval Commander S. M. Ahsan, who served as Deputy Director Naval Intelligence of Pakistan and helped formulate ISI procedure, undertook and managed the recruitment and expansion of the ISI. After the 1958 coup d'état, all national intelligence agencies were directly controlled by the president and Chief Martial Law Administrator. The maintenance of national security, which was the principal function of these agencies, resulted in the consolidation of the Ayub regime. Any criticism of the regime was seen as a threat to national security.

The ISI is headquartered in Pakistan's capital, Islamabad. The complex consists of various low-rise buildings separated by lawns and fountains. The entrance to the complex is next to a private hospital. Declan Walsh from The Guardian stated that the entrance is "suitably discreet: no sign, just a plainclothes officer packing a pistol who directs visitors through a chicane of barriers, soldiers, and sniffer dogs". Walsh noted that the complex "resembles a well-funded private university" and that the buildings are "neatly tended," the lawns are "smooth," and the fountains are "tinkling." He described the central building, which houses the director general's office on the top floor, as "a modern structure with a round, echoing lobby".

On 5 July 1977 through Operation Fair Play, the ISI began collecting intelligence on the Pakistan Communist Party and the Pakistan Peoples Party. The Soviet–Afghan War in the 1980s saw the enhancement of the ISI's covert operations. A special Afghanistan section known as the SS Directorate was created under the command of Brigadier Mohammed Yousaf to oversee day-to-day operations in Afghanistan. The ISI's black ops unit is the Covert Action Division. Officers from the Covert Action Division received training in the United States, and "many covert action experts of the CIA were attached to the ISI to guide it in its operations against Soviet troops by using the Afghan Mujahideen".

Many analysts (mainly Indian and American) believe that the ISI provides support to militant groups, though others think these allegations remain unsubstantiated.

The ISI has often been accused of playing a role in major terrorist attacks across India including militancy in Kashmir, the July 2006 Mumbai Train Bombings, the 2001 Indian Parliament attack, the 2006 Varanasi bombings, the August 2007 Hyderabad bombings, and the 2008 Mumbai attacks.

The ISI has been accused of supporting Taliban forces and recruiting and training mujahideen to fight in Afghanistan and Kashmir. Based on communication interceptions, US intelligence agencies concluded Pakistan's ISI was behind the attack on the Indian embassy in Kabul on 7 July 2008, a charge that the governments of India and Afghanistan had laid previously. It is believed to be aiding these organizations in eradicating perceived enemies or those opposed to their cause. Satellite imagery from the Federal Bureau of Investigation suggested the existence of several training camps in Pakistan, with at least one militant admitting to being trained in the country. As part of the ongoing Kashmir conflict, Pakistan is alleged to be backing separatist militias. Many nonpartisan sources believe that officials within Pakistan's military and the ISI sympathies with and aid Islamist militant and insurgent groups, saying that the ISI has provided covert, but well-documented support to separatist groups active in Kashmir, including Jaish-e-Mohammed.

General Javed Nasir confessed to assisting the besieged Bosnian Muslims. The National Intelligence Coordination Committee (NICC) of Pakistan is headed by the Director-General of Inter-Services Intelligence. The overarching intelligence coordination body was given assent by the Prime Minister of Pakistan in November 2020. It held its inaugural session on 24 June 2021, marking the date the committee became functional.

== Structure ==
A director-general, who is traditionally a serving lieutenant general in the Pakistan Army, heads the ISI. Three deputy director generals, who are serving two-star military officers, report directly to the director general with each deputy heading three wings respectively:

- Internal Wing – responsible for domestic intelligence, domestic counter-intelligence, counter-espionage, and counter-terrorism.
- External Wing – responsible for external intelligence, external counter-intelligence, and espionage.
- Foreign Relations Wing – responsible for diplomatic intelligence and foreign relations intelligence.

Military officers of the three branches of the Pakistan Armed Forces and paramilitary forces such as ANF, ASF, Pakistan Rangers, Frontier Corps, Gilgit-Baltistan Scouts and Maritime Security Agency as well as civilian officers from the Federal Investigation Agency (FIA), Federal Board of Revenue (FBR), Pakistan Customs, Police, Judiciary and Ministry of Defence make up ISI's general staff. They are recruited on deputations for three to four years and enhance the ISI's professional competence. According to some experts, the ISI is the largest intelligence agency in the world in terms of total staff. While the total number has never been made public, experts estimate around 10,000 officers and staff, which does not include informants or assets.

=== Directorates ===
The wings are further divided into various directorates, which are sub-divided into departments, each directorate is usually headed by a major general, air marshal, or rear admiral.

Directorates
Director-General, Security and Administration (DG S&A)
Director-General Analysis (DG A)
Director-General H (DG H)
Director-General Counter-Terrorism (DG CT)
Director-General Personnel (DG P)
Director-General, K (DG K)
Director-General X (DG X)
Director-General, F (DG F)
Director-General, Technical (DG T)
Director-General, Counter Intelligence (DG CI)
Director-General, Media (DG M)

=== Departments ===
- Covert Action Division: Its roles are similar to the Special Activities Division of the CIA and a handful of officers are trained by that division. The division has been active since the 1960s.
- Joint Intelligence X: Coordinates the other departments in the ISI. Intelligence and information gathered from the other departments are sent to JIX which prepares and processes the information and from there prepares reports which are presented.
- Joint Intelligence Bureau: Responsible for gathering anti-state intelligence and fake drugs, fake currency, and TTP.
- Joint Counterintelligence Bureau: Focused on foreign intelligence agencies.
- Joint Intelligence North: Exclusively responsible for the Jammu and Kashmir region and Gilgit-Baltistan.
- Joint Intelligence Miscellaneous: Responsible for espionage, including offensive intelligence operations, in other countries.
- Joint Signal Intelligence Bureau: Operates intelligence collections along the India-Pakistan border. The JSIB is the ELINT, COMINT, and SIGINT directorate that is charged with diverting attacks from foreign non-communications electromagnetic radiations emanating from sources other than nuclear detonations or radioactive sources.
- Joint Intelligence Technical: Deals with development of science and technology to advance Pakistani intelligence gathering. The directorate is charged with taking steps against electronic warfare attacks in Pakistan. Without any exception, officers from this division are reported to be engineer officers and military scientists who deal with the military promotion of science and technology. There are also separate explosives and chemical and biological warfare sections.
- SS Directorate: Comprises officers from the Special Services Group. It monitors the activities of terrorist groups that operate against Pakistan. It is comparable to the National Clandestine Service (NCS) of the CIA, and is responsible for special operations against terrorists.
- Political Internal Division: Monitors the financial funding of the right-wing political science sphere against left-wing political science circles. This department was involved in providing funds to anti-left wing forces during the general elections of 1965, 1977, 1985, 1988, and 1990. The department has been inactive since March 2012 with the new director general taking operational charge of the ISI.

== Director Generals ==
The Director General of the ISI is among the most powerful posts in Pakistan. For example, according to Mohammad Sohail, shares at the Pakistan Stock Exchange went down in October 2021 over concerns regarding the appointment of the ISI chief. The benchmark KSE-100 index fell 1.51%. According to retired air marshal Shahzad Chaudhry, three to four names are provided by the Chief of Army Staff, and the prime minister selects the director general from that list, and the appointed serves for two to three years. Before 2021, the appointment process of the Director-General followed no formal protocol other than verbal discussion between the Prime Minister and the head of the army.

Syed Shahid Hamid was the founder and first head of the ISI. He is said to have supported Ayub Khan's rise to power. After his retirement, he helped President Muhammed Zia-ul-Haq.

Director General		Start of term	End of term
1	Brigadier Syed Shahid Hamid; HJ	January 1948	22 August 1950
2	Brigadier Mirza Hamid Hussain	23 August 1950	May 1951
3	Colonel Muhammad Afzal Malik	May 1951	April 1953
4	Brigadier Syed Ghawas	April 1953	August 1955
5	Brigadier Malik Sher Bahadur	August 1955	September 1957
6	Brigadier Muhammad Hayat	September 1957	October 1959
7	Brigadier Riaz Hussain	October 1959	May 1966
8	Major General Muhammed Akbar Khan	May 1966	September 1971
9	Major General Ghulam Jilani Khan	September 1971	16 September 1978
10	Major General Muhammad Riaz Khan	17 September 1978	20 June 1979
11	Lieutenant General Akhtar Abdur Rahman; NI(M) HI(M)	21 June 1979	29 March 1987
12	Lieutenant General Hamid Gul; HI(M) SBt	29 March 1987	29 May 1989
13	Lieutenant General Shamsur Rahman Kallu; HI(M) TBt	30 May 1989	August 1990
14	Lieutenant General Asad Durrani; HI(M)	August 1990	13 March 1992
15	Lieutenant General Javed Nasir; HI(M) SBt	14 March 1992	13 May 1993
16	Lieutenant General Javed Ashraf Qazi; HI(M) SBt	14 May 1993	October 1995
17	Lieutenant General Naseem Rana	October 1995	October 1998
18	Lieutenant General Ziauddin Butt; HI(M)	October 1998	12 October 1999
19	Lieutenant General Mahmud Ahmed; HI(M)	20 October 1999	7 October 2001
20	Lieutenant General Ehsan ul Haq; HI(M)	7 October 2001	5 October 2004
21	Lieutenant General Ashfaq Parvez Kayani; HI(M) SI(M) TI(M)	5 October 2004	8 October 2007
22	Lieutenant General Nadeem Taj; HI(M) TBt	9 October 2007	29 September 2008
23	Lieutenant General Ahmad Shuja Pasha; HI(M)	1 October 2008	18 March 2012
24	Lieutenant General Zaheerul Islam; HI(M)	19 March 2012	7 November 2014
25	Lieutenant General Rizwan Akhtar	7 November 2014	11 December 2016
26	Lieutenant General Naveed Mukhtar	11 December 2016	25 October 2018
27	Lieutenant General Asim Munir; HI(M)	25 October 2018	16 June 2019
28	Lieutenant General Faiz Hameed; HI(M)	17 June 2019	19 November 2021
29	Lieutenant General Nadeem Anjum	20 November 2021	29 September 2024
30	Lieutenant General Asim Malik	30 September 2024	Incumbent

== Recruitment and training ==
Both civilians and members of the armed forces can join the ISI. For civilians, recruitment is advertised and handled by both the Federal Public Services Commission (FPSC); they are considered employees of the Ministry of Defence. The FPSC conducts examinations that test the candidate's knowledge of current affairs, English, and various analytical abilities. Based on the results, the FPSC shortlists the candidates and sends the list to the ISI who conduct the initial background checks. Selected candidates are then invited for an interview which is conducted by a joint committee comprising both ISI and FPSC officials, and are then sent to the Defence Services Intelligence Academy (DSIA) for six months of training. The candidates are transferred to different sections for open source information where they serve for five years. After five years of basic service, officers are entrusted with sensitive jobs and considered part of the core team.

== Operations ==
=== By country ===
==== Afghanistan ====
- 1982–1997: ISI is believed to have had access to Osama bin Laden in the past. B. Raman, former Research and Analysis Wing (R&AW) officer, claims that the Central Intelligence Agency through the ISI promoted the smuggling of heroin into Afghanistan to turn Soviet troops into heroin addicts and thus greatly reduce their fighting potential.
- 1986: Worrying that among the large influx of Afghan refugees who had come into Pakistan because of the Soviet–Afghan War were members of KHAD (Afghan Intelligence), the ISI convinced Mansoor Ahmed, who was the chargé d'affaires of the Afghan embassy in Islamabad, to turn his back on the Soviet-backed Afghan government. He and his family were secretly escorted out of their residence and given safe passage on a London-bound British Airways flight in exchange for classified information in regard to Afghan agents in Pakistan. The Soviet and Afghan diplomats did not find his family.
- 1990: According to Peter Tomsen, the United States Special Envoy to Afghanistan, neighboring Pakistan had tried to bring Gulbuddin Hekmatyar to power in Afghanistan against the opposition of all other mujahideen commanders and factions as early as 1990. In October 1990, the ISI had devised a plan for Hekmatyar to conduct a mass bombardment of the Afghan capital Kabul, then still under communist rule, with possible Pakistani troop reinforcements. This unilateral ISI-Hekmatyar plan was carried out, though the thirty most-important mujahideen commanders had agreed to hold a conference inclusive of all Afghan groups to decide on a common future strategy. The United States finally put pressure on Pakistan to stop the 1990 plan, which was subsequently called off until 1992.
- 1994: Former Pakistani president Pervez Musharraf admitted to supporting the Taliban until 9/11. According to Pakistani Afghanistan expert Ahmed Rashid, "between 1994 and 1999, an estimated 80,000 to 100,000 Pakistanis trained and fought in Afghanistan" on the side of the Taliban.
- 2008: Militants attacked the Indian Consulate General in Jalalabad in 2007. According to Afghanistan's National Directorate of Security, individuals arrested by the Afghan government stated that the ISI was behind the attack and had given them ₹120,000 for the operation.
- 2001 onwards: American officials believe members of the Pakistani intelligence service are alerting militants to imminent American missile strikes in Pakistan's tribal areas. In October 2009, Davood Moradian, a senior policy adviser to foreign minister Rangeen Dadfar Spanta, said the British and American governments were fully aware of the ISI's role but lacked the courage to confront Islamabad. He claimed that the Afghan government had given British and American intelligence agents evidence that proved ISI involvement in bombings.
- 2010: A new report by the London School of Economics (LSE) claimed to provide the most concrete evidence that the ISI is providing funding, training, and sanctuary to the Taliban insurgency on a scale much larger than previously thought. The report's author, Matt Waldman, spoke to nine Taliban field commanders in Afghanistan and concluded that Pakistan's relationship with the insurgents ran far deeper than previously realised. Some of those interviewed suggested that the organisation even attended meetings of the Taliban's supreme council, the Quetta Shura. A spokesman for the Pakistani military dismissed the report, describing it as "malicious". General David Petraeus, commander of the US Central Command, refused to endorse this report in a US congressional hearing and suggested that any contacts between ISI and extremists are for legitimate intelligence purposes; in his words, "you have to have contact with bad guys to get intelligence on bad guys".
- 2021: The Fall of Kabul was seen as a major strategic victory for ISI that has long been seeking a pro-Pakistan government in Kabul. The ISI has always aspired to see Islamists as the rulers of Afghanistan. The rise of Taliban in Kabul was considered as an achievement for ISI's strategic depth in Afghanistan.
- 2021: It was reported that ISI mediated talks between different factions of Taliban on the power sharing. ISI ensured Haqqani Network holds lion's share in the Taliban's Cabinet of Afghanistan.

==== Bosnia ====
- 1993: The ISI was involved in supplying arms to the Bosnian mujahideen in Bosnia-Herzegovina to prevent a total genocide of Muslims at the hands of the Serbs.

==== India ====
Indian intelligence agencies have claimed they have proof of ISI involvement with the Naxalites. ISI is also reportedly engaged in supporting Khalistani Separatism in India. A classified report accessed by the Indian newspaper Asian Age said "the ISI in particular wants Naxals to cause large-scale damage to infrastructure projects and industrial units operating in the interior parts of the country where ISI's own terror network is non-existent".

- 1965: The Indo-Pakistani War of 1965 in Kashmir provoked a major crisis in intelligence. When the war began, there was a complete collapse of operations across all intelligence agencies. They were unable to locate an Indian armored division because of their preoccupation with political affairs. Ayub Khan set up a committee headed by General Yahya Khan to examine the agencies' workings.
- 1969–1974: According to Indian spymaster B. Raman, the Central Intelligence Agency and ISI worked with the Nixon administration to assist the Khalistan movement in Punjab.
- 1980: An Indian agent captured by the PAF Field Intelligence Unit in Karachi said the leader of the spy ring was being headed by the food and beverages manager at the Intercontinental Hotel in Karachi and a number of serving Air Force officers and ratings were on his payroll. The ISI decided to question the manager to see who he was in contact with, but the former president of Pakistan, Zia-ul-Haq, intervened and wanted the manager and anyone else involved in the case arrested immediately. The manager was proven completely innocent afterwards.
- 1983: Ilam Din, also known as Ilmo, was an Indian spy working in Pakistan who had eluded capture multiple times. On 23 March at 3:00 a.m., Ilmo and two other Indian spies were apprehended by Pakistani Rangers as they illegally crossed into Pakistan from India. Their mission was to spy and report back on the new military equipment that Pakistan would be showing in their annual 23 March Pakistan Day Parade. After being thoroughly interrogated, ISI forced Ilmo to send false information to his Research and Analysis Wing handlers in India. This process continued and many more Indian spies in Pakistan, such as Roop Lal, were discovered.
- 1984: ISI uncovered a secret deal in which Indian prime minister Indira Gandhi granted naval base facilities to the USSR in Vizag and the Andaman and Nicobar Islands, and the alleged attachment of KGB advisers to then-Lieutenant General Sunderji who was the commander of Operation Blue Star in the Golden Temple in Amritsar in June 1984.
- 1984: ISI failed to perform a proper background check on the British company which supplied the Pakistan Army with its Arctic-weather gear. When Pakistan attempted to secure the top of the Siachen Glacier in 1984, it placed a large order for Arctic-weather gear with the same company that also supplied the Indian Army with its gear. The Indians were alerted to the large Pakistani purchase and deduced that this large purchase could be used to equip troops to capture the glacier. India mounted Operation Meghdoot and captured the entire glacier.
- 1988: The ISI implemented Operation Tupac, a three-part action plan for covertly supporting Kashmiri militants in their fight against Indian authorities in Kashmir, initiated by President Zia-ul-Haq in 1988 After the success of Operation Tupac, support of Kashmiri militants became Pakistan's state policy. ISI is widely believed to train and support militancy in the Kashmir region.
- 2014: In February (disclosed in March 2015), the then-Indian chief of army staff General Bikram Singh issued orders to deploy troops along the borders with Pakistan in the Rajasthan and Jammu-Kashmir regions, but the ISI got the information in a few hours and in reaction the Pakistan Army deployed its troops near the Indian borders, which alarmed Indian authorities.

2016: Home Minister Balochistan, Pakistan, Sarfraz Bugti stated on 26 March that a serving Indian Naval officer, Kulbhushan Yadav, was arrested in Balochistan by the ISI.

- 2026: On May 30, an Indian Air Force Wing Commander was arrested on accusations of spying for Pakistan and attempting to install malware on his colleague's phone. The officer was "honey-trapped by a Pakistani intelligence operative," the Delhi police said.

==== Pakistan ====
The ISI was accused of being involved in the Mehran bank scandal, in which high-ranking ISI and Army officers were allegedly given large sums of money by Yunus Habib, owner of the Mehran Bank, to deposit the ISI's foreign exchange reserves in his bank.

- 1980: The ISI became aware of a plot to assassinate Zia-ul-Haq and launch a coup to depose replace the government with an Islamic one. The attempted assassination and coup were planned for 23 March 1980, during the annual 23 March Pakistan Day Parade. The masterminds behind the coup were high-ranking military and intelligence officers, and were led by Major General Tajammal Hussain Malik; his son Captain Naveed; and his nephew Major Riaz, a former military intelligence officer. The ISI decided against arresting the men outright because they did not know how deep the conspiracy went, and kept them under strict surveillance. As the date of the annual parade approached, the ISI was satisfied that it had identified the major players in the conspiracy and arrested the men along with some high-ranking military officers.
- 1985: The ISI's Internal Political Division was accused by various members of the Pakistan People's Party of assassinating Shahnawaz Bhutto, one of Benazir Bhutto's two brothers, by poisoning in the French Riviera in the middle of 1985 as an attempt to intimidate her into not returning to Pakistan to direct the movement against Zia-ul-Haq's military government, but no proof has been found implicating the ISI.
- 1987: The ISI failed to prevent the KHAD/KGB terror campaign in Pakistan in 1987, which led to the deaths of about 324 Pakistanis in separate incidents.
- 1990: The 1990 elections were widely believed to have been rigged by the ISI in favor of the Islami Jamhoori Ittehad (IJI) party, a conglomerate of nine mainly rightist parties by the ISI under Lieutenant General Hameed Gul, to ensure the defeat of Bhutto's Pakistan Peoples Party (PPP) in the polls.
- 2000s: The ISI engaged with Pakistan armed forces in the War in North-West Pakistan against Tehrik-i-Taliban Pakistan, and is reported to have lost 78 ISI personnel.
- 2006: Rangzieb Ahmed brought a civil claim against MI5 for suggesting the ISI arrested him in 2006 and colluded in torturing him by submitting questions which were put to him under torture in Pakistan.
- 2011: The ISI arrested five Pakistanis who worked as CIA informants who passed information that led to the death of Osama bin Laden. However, among them in particular, the US was trying to seek the release of Shakil Afridi, who ran a fake vaccination campaign that provided critical intelligence for the raid on the bin Laden compound. However, the Pakistani government and military establishment refused to release Afridi, who has since been serving a 33-year prison sentence.

==== Libya ====
- 1978: The ISI spied on the residence of Colonel Hussain Imam Mabruk, who was a military attaché to the Libyan embassy in Islamabad, after he made some inflammatory statements about the military regime of Zia-ul-Haq. Mabruk was seen talking with two Pakistani men who entered and left the compound suspiciously. The ISI monitored the two men, who were later identified as Pakistani exiles who hated the current military regime and were Bhutto loyalists. They had received terrorist training in Libya and were ready to embark on a terrorist campaign in Pakistan to force the Army to step down from power. All members of the conspiracy were apprehended before any damage could be done.
- 1981: A Libyan security company called Al Murtaza Associates sent recruiters to Pakistan to entice former soldiers and servicemen to take high-paying security jobs in Libya. In reality, Libya was recruiting mercenaries to fight against Chad and Egypt, as it had border disputes with both nations. ISI became aware of the plot and the scheme was stopped. (See also CIA transnational anti-crime and anti-drug activities#Southwest Asia, Operation Cyclone, Badaber Uprising.)

==== Iran ====
- 2000s: ISI has been accused by Iran for supporting insurgency in Sistan-Baluchistan province by aiding groups like Jundallah which carried out score of terror attacks against Iranian forces.2010s.
- 2000s: ISI has been under repeated accusation of aiding Jaish-ul-Adl which is fighting for the separation of Sistan-Baluchistan from Iran.
- 2010s. ISI was locked into proxy war with IRGC of Iran to gain the maximum influence in the Southern Afghanistan.
- 2016: Uzair Baloch, a gangster of the Lyari Gang War who holds Iranian nationality, was arrested in an intelligence-based operation by Sindh Rangers. In his handwritten confession, Baloch stated that officials of Iran's Ministry of Intelligence offered him an all-expenses-paid residence in Tehran in exchange for providing sensitive information about the Pakistan Army's operations in Karachi. He says that the offer came through a third-party while he was staying in Iran's port city of Chabahar.
- 2021: Iranian Ministry of Intelligence also known as VAJA adopting ISI model to curb the internal dissent which Iranian regime is facing. It was believed that VAJA wants to promote same discipline as ISI to better fight with threats that Iran is facing from the internal chaos.

Qatar

- 2023: Qatar' State Security arrested eight former Indian Navy officials working for RAW who were spying on Qatar's stealth submarine programme at the behest of Israel. It was alleged by Indian media that Qatar was able to unearth spy network with the information provided by the ISI.

Iraq

- 2017: After ISIS's defeat in Mosul, Iraqi envoy to Pakistan, Ali Yasin Muhammad Karim, held a press conference where he expressed his government's appreciation for Pakistan's help during the fight against the terrorist organization. He praised the intelligence-sharing of the ISI and expressed interest in continuing the intelligence cooperation between the two countries.

==== France ====
- 1979: The ISI discovered a surveillance mission at the Kahuta Research Laboratories nuclear complex on 26 June 1979 by the French Ambassador to Pakistan Le Gourrierec and First Secretary Jean Forlot. Both were arrested and their cameras and other sensitive equipment were confiscated. Documents intercepted later showed that the two were recruited by the CIA.

==== Soviet Union and post-Soviet states ====
- 1980: The ISI had placed a mole in the Soviet Union's embassy in Islamabad. They reported that the Third Secretary in the Soviet Embassy was after information regarding the Karakoram Highway and was getting it from a middle-level employee, Ejaz, in the Northern Areas Transport Corporation (NATCO). The ISI contacted Ejaz, who confessed that a few months earlier a Soviet diplomat approached him and threatened his family unless he divulged sensitive information about the highway such as the road's alignment, bridge locations, and the number of Chinese personnel working on the highway. Instead of confronting the Soviet diplomat, the ISI gave him false information until the Soviet diplomat was satisfied that Ejaz had no further information and dropped him as a source.
- 1991–1993: Major General Sultan Habib, who was an operative of the ISI's Joint Intelligence Miscellaneous department, successfully procured nuclear material while being posted as the defence attaché in the Pakistani Embassy in Moscow from 1991 to 1993 and concurrently obtained other materials from Central Asian Republics, Poland and the former Czechoslovakia. After Moscow, Habib coordinated shipping missiles from North Korea and the training of Pakistani experts in missile production, both of which strengthened Pakistan's nuclear weapons program and their missile delivery systems.

==== United States ====
- 1980s: The ISI intercepted two American private-sector weapons dealers during the Soviet-Afghan war of the 1980s. One American diplomat lived in the F-7/4 sector of Islamabad and was spotted by an ISI agent in a seedy part of Rawalpindi, drawing attention because of his automobile's diplomatic plates. He was bugged and subsequently trailed and found to be in contact with tribal groups and supplying them with weapons for their fight against the Soviet Army in Afghanistan. The second American weapons dealer was Eugene Clegg, a teacher in the American International School. One American International School employee and undercover agent, Naeem, was arrested while waiting to clear a shipment from Islamabad customs. All of them were put out of business.
- 2000s: The ISI was suspicious about the CIA's attempted penetration of Pakistan nuclear assets and intelligence gathering in the Pakistani lawless tribal areas. Based on these suspicions, it was speculated that the ISI pursued a counter-intelligence program against CIA operations in Pakistan and Afghanistan. Former director general Ashfaq Parvez Kayani is also reported to have said, the "real aim of U.S. [war] strategy is to denuclearize Pakistan".
- 2011: In the aftermath of a shooting involving American CIA agent Raymond Davis, the ISI became more alert and suspicious about the CIA's spy network in Pakistan, which had disrupted ISI-CIA cooperation. At least 30 suspected covert American operatives have suspended their activities in Pakistan and 12 have reportedly left the country.

A Chinese woman believed to be an ISI agent, who headed the Chinese unit of a US manufacturer, was charged with illegally exporting high-performance coatings for Pakistan's nuclear power plants. Xun Wang, a former managing director of PPG Paints Trading in Shanghai, a Chinese subsidiary of United States-based PPG Industries, Inc., was indicted on a charge of conspiring to violate the International Emergency Economic Powers Act and related offences. Wang was accused of conspiring to export and re-export specially designed, high-performance epoxy coatings to the Chashma 2 Nuclear Power Plant in Pakistan via a third-party distributor in the People's Republic of China. Alleged ISI operative Mohammed Tasleem, an attaché in the New York consulate, was discovered to be issuing threats against Pakistanis living in the United States to prevent them from speaking openly about Pakistan's government in 2010 by the FBI. US officials and scholars say the ISI has a systematic campaign to threaten those who speak critically of the Pakistani military.

==== Sri Lanka ====
- 2000s: ISI played pivotal role in crushing Tamil Insurgency in Sri Lanka which was being supported by India's RAW to carve out separate Tamil country for the Tamils of Sri Lanka. ISI, in response to the RAW's machinations, started to equip, train and provide logistical support to the Sri Lankan Armed Forces in their war against Tamil rebels. ISI supplied multi-barrel rocket launcher systems and other weaponry, which halted the offensive. ISI, by supplying high-tech military equipment such as 22 Al-Khalid main battle tanks, 250,000 rounds of mortar ammunition and 150,000 hand grenades, and sending army officers to Sri Lanka, played a key role in the ultimate defeat of Tamil Tigers in May 2009. The victory of Sri Lankan Armed Forces on Tamil Tigers ultimately strengthened Pakistan-Sri Lanka ties.
- 2011: ISI started to train State Police of Sri Lanka and Sri Lankan State Intelligence Service on intelligence gathering.

=== Al Qaeda and Taliban militants captured ===
- Ramzi Yousef: One of the planners of the 1993 World Trade Center bombing and the Bojinka plot. Pakistani intelligence, and the Department of State – U.S. Diplomatic Security Service (DSS) Special Agents, captured Yousef in Islamabad, Pakistan. On 7 February 1995, they raided room number 16 in the Su-Casa Guest House in Islamabad and captured Yousef before he could move to Peshawar.
- Ibn al-Shaykh al-Libi: A Libyan paramilitary trainer for Al-Qaeda, attempted to flee Afghanistan in November 2001 following the collapse of the Taliban, precipitating the 2001 U.S. invasion of Afghanistan. He was captured by Pakistani forces.
- Ahmed Omar Saeed Sheikh: A British-born terrorist of Pakistani descent who was arrested by Pakistani police on 12 February 2002 in Lahore for his involvement with the Pearl kidnapping. Pearl had been kidnapped, had his throat slit, and then beheaded. He was named the chief suspect, but claimed he had surrendered to the ISI a week earlier.
- Abu Zubaydah: An Al-Qaeda terrorist responsible for conceiving multiple terrorist plots, including sending Ahmed Ressam to blow up the Los Angeles airport in 2000. He was captured on 28 March 2002, by ISI, CIA, and FBI agents after they raided several safe houses in Faisalabad, Pakistan.
- Ramzi bin al-Shibh: An Al-Qaeda terrorist responsible for planning the 9/11 terrorist attacks, the USS Cole bombing, and the 2002 Ghriba synagogue bombing in Tunisia. On 11 September 2002, the ISI captured Ramzi bin al-Shibh during a raid in Karachi.
- Khalid Sheikh Mohammed: The principal architect of the 9/11 attacks and other significant terrorist plots over the last twenty years, including the World Trade Center 1993 bombings, the Bojinka plot, an aborted 2002 attack on the U.S. Bank Tower in Los Angeles, the Bali nightclub bombings, the failed bombing of American Airlines Flight 63, the Millennium Plot, and the murder of Daniel Pearl. On 1 March 2003, the ISI captured him in a joint raid with the CIA's Special Activities Division paramilitary operatives and Diplomatic Security Service Special Agents in Rawalpindi, Pakistan.
- Abu Faraj Farj al-Liby: Mastermind of two failed attempts on President Pervez Musharraf's life in May 2005.
- Maulvi Omar: Senior aid to Baitullah Mehsud, who was captured by the ISI in August 2009.
- Abdul Ghani Baradar: The Taliban's deputy commander who was captured by Pakistani intelligence forces in or near Karachi, Pakistan, in early 2010.

== Reception ==
Critics of the ISI say that it has become a state within a state and not accountable enough. Some analysts say that it is because intelligence agencies around the world remain secretive. Critics argue the institution should be more accountable to the president or the prime minister. The Pakistani government disbanded the ISI's political wing in 2008 after its discovery.

=== U.S. government ===
During the Cold War, the ISI and the CIA worked together to send spy planes over the Soviet Union. The two organisations also worked closely during the Soviet–Afghan War supporting groups such as Gulbuddin Hekmatyar's Hezb-i Islami and Jalaluddin Haqqani, leader of the Haqqani network.

Some report the ISI and CIA stepped up cooperation in the aftermath of the 9/11 attacks to kill and capture senior Al Qaeda leaders such as Sheikh Younis Al Mauritan and Khalid Shaikh Mohammed, the planner of the 9/11 attacks who was residing in Pakistan. Pakistan claims that around 100 top level al-Qaeda leaders/operators were killed or arrested by the ISI. Secretary of State Hillary Clinton said Pakistan is paying a "big price for supporting the U.S. war against terror groups. [...] as they have made these adjustments in their own assessment of their national interests, they're paying a big price for it."

Other senior international officials maintain that senior Al Qaeda leaders such as bin Laden have been hidden by the ISI in major settled areas of Pakistan with the full knowledge of the Pakistani military leadership. A December 2011 analysis report by the Jamestown Foundation came to the conclusion that

In spite of denials by the Pakistani military, evidence is emerging that elements within the Pakistani military harbored Osama bin Laden with the knowledge of former army chief General Pervez Musharraf and possibly former Chief of Army Staff (COAS) General Ashfaq Pervez Kayani. Former Pakistani General Ziauddin Butt (a.k.a. General Ziauddin Khawaja) revealed at a conference on Pakistani-U.S. relations in October 2011 that according to his knowledge the then former Director-General of Intelligence Bureau of Pakistan (2004–2008), Brigadier Ijaz Shah (retd.), had kept Osama bin Laden in an Intelligence Bureau safe house in Abbottabad.

Pakistani general Ziauddin Butt said bin Laden had been hidden in Abbottabad by the ISI "with the full knowledge" of General Pervez Musharraf but later denied making any such statement, saying his words were altered by the media, he said: "It is the hobby of the Western media to distort the facts for their own purposes." U.S. military officials have increasingly said they do not notify Pakistani officials before conducting operations against the Afghan Taliban or Al Qaeda, because they fear Pakistani officials may tip them off. International officials have accused the ISI of continuing to support and even lead the Taliban during the 2001-2021 War in Afghanistan. As Chairman of the Joint Chiefs of Staff, Mike Mullen stated:

The fact remains that the Quetta Shura [Taliban] and the Haqqani Network operate from Pakistan with impunity ... Extremist organizations serving as proxies of the government of Pakistan are attacking Afghan troops and civilians as well as US soldiers. ... For example, we believe the Haqqani Network—which has long enjoyed the support and protection of the Pakistani government ... is, in many ways, a strategic arm of Pakistan's Inter-Services Intelligence Agency.

The Associated Press reported that "the president said Mullen's statement 'expressed frustration' over the insurgent safe havens in Pakistan. But Obama said 'the intelligence is not as clear as we might like in terms of what exactly that relationship is.' Obama added that whether Pakistan's ties with the Haqqani network are active or passive, Pakistan has to deal with it."

The Guantanamo Bay files leak showed that the US authorities unofficially consider the ISI a terrorist organization that was equally as dangerous as Al Qaeda and the Taliban, and many allegations of it supporting terrorist activities have been made.

In 2017, General Joseph Dunford, chairman of the Joint Chiefs of Staff, accused the ISI of having ties to terror groups. In a Senate hearing, Dunford told members of the U.S. Senate: "It is clear to me that the ISI has connections with terrorist groups."

=== Indian government ===
India has accused the ISI of plotting or funding/supporting many terrorist attacks in Indian territory. According to the United States diplomatic cables leak, the ISI had previously shared intelligence information with Israel regarding possible terrorist attacks against Jewish and Israeli sites in India in late 2008. The ISI is also accused of supporting pro independence militias in Jammu and Kashmir while Pakistan denies all such claims, or says it gives them moral support only.

India and SATP has claimed that ISI backed groups have carried out over 70,000 small incidents (such as grenade lobbying, IED blasts, sniper fire, etc.) in Jammu and Kashmir, resulting in the death of over 15,000+ civilians and 6,400+ Indian security personellel.

== Controversies ==
The ISI has been accused of using designated terrorist groups and militants to conduct proxy wars against its neighbors. According to Grant Holt and David H. Gray, "The agency specializes in utilizing terrorist organizations as proxies for Pakistani foreign policy, covert action abroad, and controlling domestic politics." James Forest says, "There has been increasing proof from counter-terrorism organizations that militants and the Taliban continue to receive assistance from the ISI, as well as the establishment of camps to train terrorists on Pakistani territory." All external operations are carried out under the supervision of the ISI's S Wing. Joint Intelligence/North is responsible for conducting operations in Jammu and Kashmir and Afghanistan. The Joint Signal Intelligence Bureau (JSIB) provides support with communications to groups in Jammu and Kashmir. According to Daniel Benjamin and Steven Simon, both former members of the United States National Security Council, the ISI acted as a "kind of terrorist conveyor belt" radicalizing young men in the Madrassas in Pakistan and delivering them to training camps affiliated with or run by Al-Qaeda and from there moving them into Jammu and Kashmir to launch attacks.

=== Support for militants ===
Since the 1990s, the ISI began communicating with the jihadists who emerged from the conflict against the Soviet Union in Afghanistan, and by 2000 most militant groups operating in Kashmir were based in Pakistan or were pro-Pakistan. These groups are used to conduct a low-intensity conflict against India. According to Stephen P. Cohen and John Wilson, the ISI's aid to and creation of designated terrorist groups and religious extremist groups is well-documented. The ISI has been accused of having close ties to Lashkar-e-Taiba, who carried out the attacks in Mumbai in 2008. The organisation has also given aid to Hizbul Mujahideen. Terrorism expert Gus Martin said, "The ISI has a long history of supporting designated terrorist groups and pro-Independence groups operating in Punjab and Jammu and Kashmir which fight against Indian interests." The ISI also helped with the founding of the group Jaish-e-Mohammed. In July 2010, David Cameron criticized Pakistan saying, "We cannot tolerate in any sense the idea that this country is allowed to look both ways and is able, in any way, to promote the export of terror, whether to India or whether to Afghanistan or anywhere else in the world." And also how Pakistan supported militant groups and their activities.

==== Hizbul Mujahideen ====
The group Hizbul Mujahideen was created as the Kashmiri branch of Jamaat-i-Islami. It was reported that JI founded Hizbul Mujahideen at the request of the ISI to counter the Jammu and Kashmir Liberation Front who are advocates for the independence of Kashmir. The failure of 1987 elections in Kashmir, and afterwards the arrest of Muhammad Yusuf, a.k.a. Syed Salahuddin, led to the events that created armed struggle in the valley.

==== Al-Badr ====
There have been three incarnations of Al-Badr. According to Tomsen, the ISI, in conjunction with Jamaat-e-Islami Pakistan, formed the first Al-Badr, who resisted the Indian-trained influx of Mukti Bahini in Bangladesh in the 1970s.

==== Al-Qaeda and bin Laden ====
The ISI supported Al-Qaeda during the war along with the CIA against the Soviet government, through the Taliban, and it is believed by some that there is still contact between Al-Qaeda and the ISI. An assessment by British Intelligence in 2000 into Al-Qaeda training camps in Afghanistan showed the ISI were playing an active role in some of them. In 2002, it was alleged that when the Egyptian investigators tracked down Al-Qaeda member Ahmed Said Khadr in Pakistan, the Egyptian authorities informed Pakistani authorities of his location. However, the Afghan Taliban at night came in a car and took Khadir along with them to Afghanistan. The next day, Pakistani authorities claimed they were unable to capture Khadir. The leak in 2012 of e-mails from Stratfor claimed papers captured during all the compounds during the raid in Abbottabad on Osama bin Laden's compound showed up to 12 ISI officials knew where he was and that Bin Laden had been in regular contact with the ISI.

Despite the allegations, Steve Coll stated that as of 2019 there is no direct evidence showing Pakistani knowledge of bin Laden's presence in Abbottabad, even by a rogue or compartmented faction within the government, other than the circumstantial fact of bin Laden's compound being located near (albeit not directly visible from) the Pakistan Military Academy. Documents captured from the Abbottabad compound generally show that bin Laden was wary of contact with ISI and Pakistani police, especially in light of Pakistan's role in the arrest of Khalid Sheikh Mohammed; it has also been suggested that the $25 million U.S. reward for information leading to bin Laden would have been enticing to Pakistani officers given their reputation for corruption. The compound itself, although unusually tall, was less conspicuous than sometimes envisaged by Americans, given the common local habit of walling off homes for protection against violence or to ensure the privacy of female family members.

Al-Qaeda has repeatedly labelled ISI their enemy, and claimed the Pakistani military and intelligence are their main targets in Pakistan. In 2019, Ayman al-Zawahari labelled ISI and the Pakistani military a "puppet" of the United States in a video message.

==== Harkat-ul-Mujahideen ====
The Harkat-ul-Mujahideen was founded in the 1980s by the ISI to fight against Indian interests.

==== Jammu and Kashmir ====
in 1984, under the orders of Zia-ul-Haq, the ISI prepared for a rebellion, which was to be set in motion in 1991.

==== Haqqani network ====
The ISI allegedly have links to the Haqqani network and contributed to their funding. It is widely believed the suicide attack on the Indian embassy in Kabul in 2008 was planned with the help of the ISI. A report in 2008 from the US director of National Intelligence stated that the ISI provides intelligence and funding to help with attacks against the International Security Assistance Force, the Afghan government, and Indian targets. On 5 November 2014, Lieutenant-General Joseph Anderson, a senior commander for US and NATO forces in Afghanistan, said that the Haqqani network is now "fractured" like the Taliban in a Pentagon-hosted video briefing from Afghanistan. "They are fractured. They are fractured like the Taliban is. That's based pretty much on Pakistan's operations in North Waziristan this entire summer-fall," he said, acknowledging the effectiveness of Pakistan's military offensive in North Waziristan. "That has very much disrupted their efforts in Afghanistan and has caused them to be less effective in terms of their ability to pull off an attack in Kabul," Anderson added.

=== Insubordination controversies ===
On 6 October 2016, the daily newspaper Dawn published a report about a government meeting allegedly arranged by Sharif. The article detailed a presentation by Foreign Secretary Aizaz Chaudhry about international pressure to crack down on Pakistan's extremist segments such as Masood Azhar, the Jaish-i-Mohmmad, Hafiz Saeed, the Lashkar-e-Taiba, and the Haqqani network. According to Ghazi Salahuddin of The News International, controversy ensued after the October meeting and the Dawn report, which lingered until May 2016. During the October 2016 meeting, Punjab chief minister Shehbaz Sharif allegedly revealed that, whenever action had been taken against certain extremist groups by civilian authorities, the security agency had worked secretly to free the arrested parties. According to Salahuddin Ghazi, information minister Pervaiz Rashid lost his portfolio over the Dawn news leak, and a government notification was released about the civilian government's decision after the meeting. On 29 April 2017, the director general released a tweet that said: "Notification on Dawn Leak is incomplete and not in line with recommendations by the Inquiry Board. Notification is rejected." Ghazi stated that a meeting was eventually held between the prime minister and the chief of army staff, and a press conference was held to announce the decision to withdraw the tweet.

==== 2021 disagreement over appointment of ISI Chief ====
Pakistan's mainstream media reported on the October 2021 constitutional rift between civil and armed wings over the appointment of the director general post only after ministers spoke on the matter. On 6 October 2021, the Pakistan military's media affairs wing announced the replacement of Faiz Hameed with Nadeem Anjum. After two days, it became apparent on social media that the federal government of Pakistan had yet to issue any formal notification for the appointment of the new director general. Rumors became more substantiated when Hameed attended the National Security Committee meeting instead of the expected new director general.

On 13 October 2021, Information Minister Fawad Chaudhry informed media that the process of appointing a new director general was in progress, and that the selection is Prime Minister Imran Khan's prerogative. He also noted that the army chief and the prime minister agreed on following correct procedures of appointment according to the Constitution.

=== Attacks on journalists ===
Amnesty International published a document concerning the investigation of ISI over the murder of Saleem Shahzad.

== See also ==
- Pakistani intelligence community
- Military Intelligence of Pakistan
- Air Intelligence of Pakistan
- Naval Intelligence of Pakistan
- Intelligence Bureau of Pakistan
- Inter Services Public Relations
