= Sayad Ghawas =

5th Pakistani Intelligence Chief and 11th Governor of the North-Western Frontier

Major General Sayad Ghawas SQA
- صیاد گواس
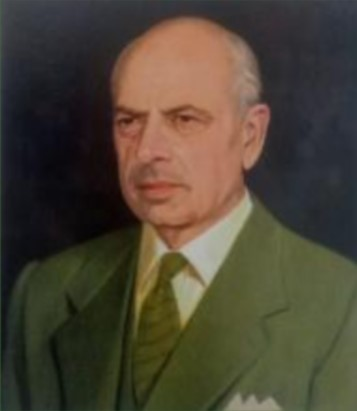
- Portrait, c. 1974

11th Governor of the North-West Frontier Province
- In office 24 May 1974 – 1 March 1976
- Prime Minister: Zulfikar Ali Bhutto
- Preceded by: Arbab Sikandar Khan
- Succeeded by: Naseerullah Khan Babar

6th Master General of Ordnance Pakistan Army
- In office 16 June 1961 – 31 March 1966
- Succeeded by: Khwaja Wasiuddin

5th Director General of the Inter-Services Intelligence
- In office April 1953 – August 1955
- Succeeded by: Malik Sher Bahadur
Preceding Commands
Colonel Commandant Baloch Regiment
In office 11 February 1961 – 12 October 1966
Succeeded by	General Abdul Hamid Khan
Martial Law Sub-Administrator Sector No. 3 Zone B (Lahore Garrison)
In office 14 October 1959 – 1 July 1960
Preceded by	Brigadier Sadiqullah Khan Orakzai
Commanding Officer 3rd Battalion Baloch Regiment
In office October 1947 – October 1948
Succeeded by	Abdul Hamid Khan

Personal details
- Born: 11 November 1909 Mardan, North-West Frontier Province
- Died: 5 October 1995 (aged 85) Pakistan
- Education: Indian Military Academy; Mons Officer Cadet School

Military service
- Branch/service: British Indian Army (1935-1947); Pakistan Army (1947-1966)
- Years of service: 1935-1966
- Rank: Major General
- Unit: East Yorkshire Regiment (1936); 10th Baluch Regiment (1937)
- Commands: MGO (Pakistan); Baloch Regiment; Inter-Services Intelligence
- Battles/wars: World War II; Indo-Pakistani War of 1947-1948; Indo-Pakistani War of 1965
- Awards: Sitara-e-Quaid-e-Azam (1958)

Sayad Ghawas (Note: Urdu: صیاد گواس Sometimes spelled as Syed Ghawas) (11 November 1909 — 5 October 1995) was a former Pakistani Major General who served as the fourth Director-General of Inter-Services Intelligence from 1953 and 1955, sixth Master General of Ordnance from 1961 to 1966, and the 11th Governor of the North-West Frontier Province from 1974 to 1976.

== Early life ==
Sayad Ghawas was born on 11 November 1909 into a Pashtun Muslim family in Mardan.

== Personal life ==
He was married and had daughters and one son, (retd) Colonel Khalid Ghawas. One of his daughters, Mariam Ghawas presented Queen Elizabeth II with a bouquet of flowers on her visit to Pakistan in 1961.

According to author Anwar S. Hussain, Ghawas was known as one of the largest landlords of the North-West Frontier Province.

According to General Musa Khan, Ghawas was an avid golfer.

== Military career ==
=== British Indian Army (1935-1947) ===
He was commissioned into the 5th Battalion of the Baluch Regiment on 1 September 1935. Under Officer Sayad Ghawas was among 30 gentlemen cadets who qualified at the final passing out examination of the Indian Military Academy in May 1936. He also commanded the end of term parade.

He was promoted to Second Lieutenant on 19 July 1936 and attached to the 1st Battalion of the East Yorkshire Regiment on 10 August 1936. As a Lieutenant, he joined the 10th Baluch Regiment on 24 August 1937. By 1942, he was serving as General Staff Officer Grade 3 Intelligence at Central Command headquartered in Agra.

Captain Ghawas was appointed as the Assistant Director Intelligence in Peshawar under the Government of British India on 1 June 1943.

=== Pakistan Army (1947-1966) ===
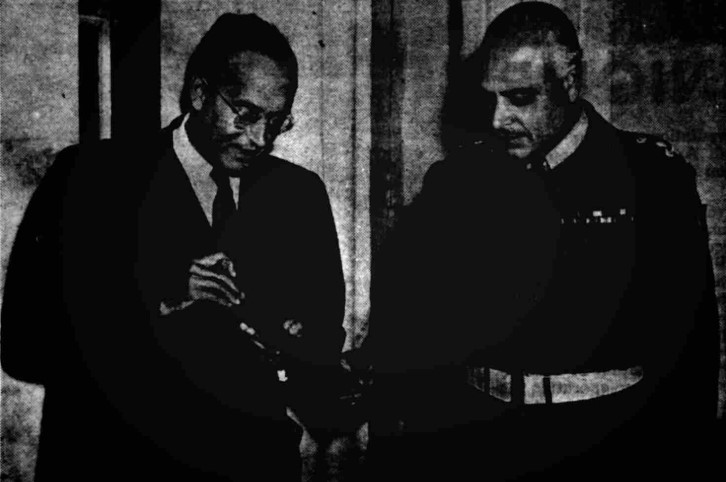
General Officer Commanding 11th Division Brig Ghawas presents his divisional tie to US Ambassador Horace Hildreth (left) during the latter's visit to Peshawar, 1957

After the Partition of British India in August 1947, Lieutenant Colonel Ghawas transferred his service to the Pakistan Army. He succeeded Lt. Col. R.H. Farrimond (MC) as the Commanding Officer of 3rd Battalion, Baloch Regiment in October 1947 and served until October 1948. He was succeeded by Lt. Col. Abdul Hamid Khan in November 1948.

In June 1950, Brigadier Ghawas was appointed as the Senior Military Liaison Officer of Pakistan to the United Kingdom. He attended a 10-day conference at the War Office in London starting on 25 July 1951, for an exchange of views and held initial talks on top-secret military matters with Chief of the Imperial General Staff Field Marshal Slim. Ghawas was later succeeded by his General Staff Officer Grade 3 (GSO3) J.T. Chopping.

(Retd) Brigadier A.R. Siddiqui recalled Brigadier Sayed Ghawas' involvement in an alleged transaction while serving as Pakistan's military attache in London during the mid-1950s. Ghawas had contacted and paid off an Indian brigadier to acquire a top-secret war plan for Rs20,000. By the time the 1965 war started, the purported war plan obtained by Ghawas would have been at least seven years old. Even though the plan was rechecked under the orders of Field Marshal Ayub Khan and apparently found satisfactory, Siddiqi argued that the plan had little operational value in 1965. He suggested that Ayub and his high command were likely deceived by the Indian agent.

In 1955, ISI Chief Brigadier Ghawas asked his counterparts in London for help in setting up Joint Intelligence Committee-style structures in Pakistan.

Major General Ghawas was appointed Martial Law Administrator Zone 'B', replacing Lieutenant General Bakhtiar Rana, effective 25 January 1961.

Major General Ghawas was appointed as the sixth Master General of Ordnance of the Pakistan Army on 16 June 1961. According to retired Brigadier Zahir Alam Khan, it was rumored that Major General Ghawas, as the Master General of Ordnance, was held responsible for negligence within the Ordnance Corps during the 1965 War. The issue involved ammunition supplied by the Americans which had been fused for anti-aircraft firing and a point detonating fuse for firing the ammunition from tanks had been supplied but Ordnance had not changed the fuse. Further inspection revealed that reserve ammunition contained HEAT (high-explosive anti-tank) rounds instead of the required armor-piercing rounds.

== Governor of the North-West Frontier Province (1974-1976) ==
Governor Ghawas (red tie and handkerchief), Governor Ra'ana Liaquat Ali Khan, Chief Minister Ghulam Mustafa Jatoi, and the law minister attended a meeting in Islamabad, where it was decided to ensure direct representation for Christians and other minorities in Pakistan and to establish a new medical center in Hazara. Although the video does not show them, two other governors and three additional chief ministers also attended the meeting. (1974)

Prime Minister Zulfikar Ali Bhutto appointed Ghawas as the Governor of the North-West Frontier Province on 24 May 1974. Upon being sworn in, he stated that his main concern was to enforce law and order, hoping that he would live up to the task and confidence vested in him by Bhutto. He was also granted absolute power.

Ghawas was not acquainted with Bhutto prior to his appointment as Governor. According to Farhatullah Babar, during one of Bhutto's visits to Peshawar, Ghawas received a call from the Aide-de-camp (ADC) to the Prime Minister, informing him of a meeting with Bhutto that evening. Although puzzled as he had not sought an appointment, Ghawas agreed to the meeting when he learned it was at Bhutto's request. In a meeting lasting less than half an hour, Bhutto informed him of the decision to appoint him as provincial governor. Ghawas remained curious about why Bhutto, whose path he had never crossed and whose politics he "did not admire," had selected him.

Babar also recounts an incident at the meeting, involving Inayatullah Khan Gandapur, the Chief Minister. After Bhutto announced the dismissal of Gandapur's ministry and the appointment of a new Chief Minister, Gandapur felt humiliated and accused Ghawas of keeping him in the dark about the decision. Ghawas stood up and placed his hand on Gandapur's shoulder and said, "I swear upon my God that I was also not privy to the decision and that the announcement has also shocked me." Gandapur felt betrayed and left the meeting immediately, vacated the Chief Minister's house the same night and left for his hometown, Kulachi, and plunged into "political oblivion for a long time."

During Prime Minister Bhutto's visits to the Frontier Province, Babar observed that Bhutto would get up from his seat when Ghawas entered a meeting room, prompting everyone else to do the same. Ghawas, often embarrassed, would quickly take his seat beside Bhutto, apologising and wondered aloud if the meeting had started ahead of schedule. His tenure as governor was marked by his "dignified conduct and the respect he commanded from Bhutto and others in the administration." Babar adds that Ghawas' leadership and presence were felt throughout his service, leaving a lasting impact on those who worked with him.

On 10 January 1975, Governor Ghawas issued an ordinance aimed at suppressing crime, "providing for measures to deal more effectively with offences against life and property in the province." The ordinance, titled "The North West Frontier Province Suppression of Crimes Ordinance 1975," "will come into force at once." Under this law, District Magistrates were granted the authority to impose collective fines of up to one lakh rupees on male adults or any of them in areas found to be involved in the commission or abetment of serious offences against persons or property, failure to assist in identifying offenders, or harboring those suspected of serious offences or withholding evidence.

The Pakistan Heart Foundation was inaugurated by Governor Ghawas at Muhammadi Hospital in Peshawar on 8 February 1975.

On 17 February 1975, Prime Minister Zulfikar Ali Bhutto's government imposed direct rule over the troubled North-West Frontier Province, accusing neighboring Afghanistan of inciting subversive activities. The government announced that Governor Ghawas would oversee the province on behalf of federal authorities for a period of 90 days.

Nearly a year after his appointment as Governor, a purported Wikileaks cable from the U.S. Embassy in Islamabad read that Ghawas had a mixed reputation. Some saw him as a "pleasant but weak-willed gentleman," while others as a "good administrator" with a "reputation for integrity." There were also differing opinions on his mental acuity.

== Legacy ==
Farhatullah Babar described Ghawas as "an upright octogenarian," who was "always impeccably dressed". Leading a quiet life in his hometown of Mardan, Ghawas was unexpectedly appointed as Governor by Bhutto. He also said that despite his age, Ghawas had "a dignified bearing and firm gait," making him an "inspiring figure".

(Retd) Brigadier John Randle wrote: "Ghawas was a most pleasant and courteous host".

== Notes ==
Military offices
Preceded by Muhammad Afzal Malik	Director General of Inter-Services Intelligence; 1953–1955	Succeeded by Malik Sher Bahadur
Political offices
Preceded by Aslam Khattak	Governor of the North-West Frontier Province; 1974—1976	Succeeded by Naseerullah Babar
