= Master-General of Ordnance (Pakistan) =

Principal officer in the Pakistan Army

The Master General of Ordnance (or MGO) of the Pakistan Army is one of the five principal officers assisting the Chief of Army Staff of the Pakistan Army (COAS) in his duties, operating from army headquarters in Rawalpindi. The other principal officers are the Chief of General Staff (CGS); the Quartermaster General (QMG); the Adjutant General (AG); and the Inspector General for Evaluation and Training (IGT&E).

Major General Syed Shahid Hamid was the first native Master General of Ordnance of the Pakistan Army.

== Master Generals of Ordnance ==
Term	Name	Took office	Left office
1	Major General; A. Whiteside	November 1947	11 February 1951
2	Major General; Syed Shahid Hamid	12 February 1951	December 1956
3	Major General; Mian Ghulam Jilani	January 1957	December 1957
4	Major General; Altaf Qadir	January 1958	November 1959
5	Major General; Fazal Muqeem Khan; SQA	12 November 1959	15 June 1961
6	Major General; Syed Ghawas; SQA	16 June 1961	31 March 1966
7	Major General; Khwaja Wasiuddin; SPk	1 April 1966	Unknown
