= Qasim Jan =

Courtier in the royal courts of Mughal Delhi

- Born: 18th century Samarkand (present-day Uzbekistan)
- Died: 19th century Delhi, Mughal Empire

Nawab Qasim Jan was a courtier in the royal courts of Mughal Delhi. According to some sources he came from Yarkand and first lived in Lahore, attached to the court of the Governor Moin-ul-Mulk in the 1750s, thereafter he moved to Delhi and joined the Mughal court under emperor, Shah Alam II (r. 1728–1806).

Soon he was given the title of Nawab and Khan, and given the region of Hateen near Gurgaon and thereafter he built his home close to Red Fort, in Ballimaran, Delhi, in the lane that is still known as Gali Qasim Jan, and also built mosque nearby known as Qasim Khani Mosque. He had two brothers, Alam Jan and Arif Jan, whose son, Ahmad Baksh Khan, later founded the princely state of Loharu (now in Bhiwani district) in 1806. Noted Urdu poet, Mirza Ghalib was married to Umrao Begum, daughter of Nawab Ilahi Bakhsh Khan (younger brother of the first Nawab of Loharu, Ahmad Baksh Khan); Ghalib ki Haveli, the poet's residence in Delhi, was in Gali Qasim Jan and is now a museum.

His son, Nawab Faizullah Beg, was a courtier during emperor Bahadur Shah Zafar's reign, and built a complex later known as Ahata Kaley Sahab, so named after saint Kaley Khan, who lived here for a while, after whom Delhi's Sarai Kale Khan is also named. The complex was later acquired by Bunyadi Begum, poet Mirza Ghalib's sister-in-law, and housed the poet after he was released from debtors' prison.

== Descendants ==
Some of the prominent people who are linked to Qasim Jan lineage are Nawab of Loharu, Fakhruddin Ali Ahmed and Mirza Ghalib, whereas his own descendants were:

- Son: Mirza Shakir Hussain Barlas (Barrister at Law)
  - Wife: Bibi Mehmooda Begum (daughter of Nawab Amjad Ali Shah of Sardhana, last Nawab of Sardhana, and sister of Sirdar Ikbal Ali Shah)
    - Daughter: Halima Barlas
    - Daughter: Nafisa Barlas (wife of M. Sultan Yar Khan, advocate and Member of Delhi Legislative Assembly (1952–56), their son Naved Yar Khan a well-known activist, demanded restoration of Kohinoor diamond to India from England and the Peacock Throne from Iran and has filed various public interest litigations including the sensitive Babri Masjid-Ram Janam Bhoomi case (Ayodhya dispute)
    - Daughter: Aquila Barlas, later known as Dr. Aquila Kiani
      - Son: Khalid Kiani
      - Son: Sohail Kiani
      - Daughter: Lina Kiani
    - Daughter: Naema Barlas, later known as Dr. N. B. Matuk
    - Son: Nawab Mirza Aqil Hussain Barlas
    - Wife: Bibi Mehtabunnisa Begum (daughter of the Grand Vizier of Alwar)
    - Wife: Nusrat Barlas
      - Son: Nawab Mirza Adil Hussain Barlas
      - Wife: Rukhsana Barlas
        - Daughter: Adila Barlas
        - Daughter: Ayat Barlas
          - Son: Nawab Mirza Danyaal Hussain Barlas
          - Son: Nawab Mirza Aahil Hussain Barlas
        - Daughter: Zeisha Barlas
