= Syed Shahid Hamid =

Pakistani major-general & Founder of Inter-Services-Intelligence (ISI), (1910–1993)

Syed Shahid Hamid HJ

Personal details
- Born: Syed Shahid Hamid; 17 September 1910 Lucknow, United Provinces of Agra and Oudh, British India
- Died: 12 March 1993 (aged 82) Rawalpindi, Punjab, Pakistan
- Relations: Altaf Fatima; Mishal Husain (granddaughter); Salman Rushdie (nephew)
- Education: Royal Military College, Sandhurst

Military service
- Allegiance: British India 1934–1947; Pakistan 1947–1964
- Branch/service: British Indian Army; Pakistan Army
- Years of service: 1934–1964
- Rank: Major-General
- Commands: Master General of Ordnance (MGO); Adjutant-General (AG); DG Military Intelligence
- Battles/wars: World War II; Japanese invasion of Burma; Burma Campaign (1944–1945); Indo-Pakistani War of 1947; Ladakh Military operations
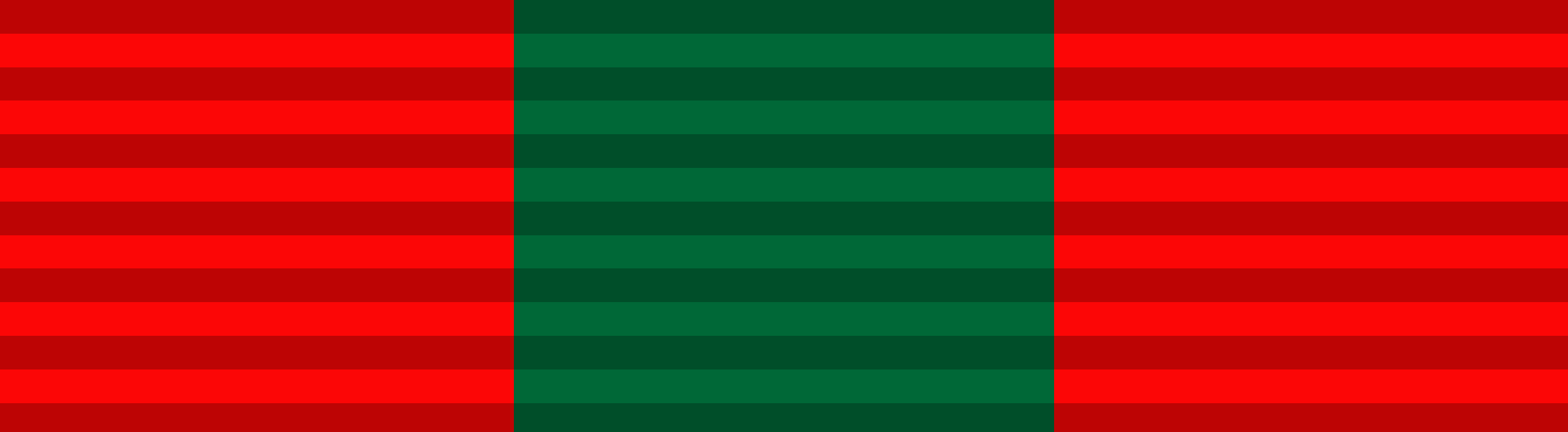
- Awards: Hilal-i-Jurat

Syed Shahid Hamid HJ (Urdu: سید شاهد حامد; 17 September 1910 – 12 March 1993) was a two-star general in the Pakistan Army, and the first Director-General of Inter-Services Intelligence.

Hamid was the first Master General of Ordnance (MGO) of the Pakistan Army before establishing the ISI in 1948. He also authored numerous books, most notably Disastrous Twilight - A Personal Record of the Partition of India 1946-1947, an eyewitness account of being on the staff of the last British Commander in Chief of the Indian Army, Field Marshal Sir Claude Auchinleck.

He was the grandfather of the British journalist, Mishal Husain.

== Early life ==
Hamid was born to a aristocratic Sayyid family in British India. He went to school at the Colvin Taluqdar school (Lucknow) in 1923 before going to the Aligarh Muslim University. He was accepted into the Royal Military College Sandhurst in 1932. During his time at Sandhurst, he excelled in tennis and represented the college in the sport.

He graduated and received a commission onto the Unattached List, Indian Army on 1 February 1934. He arrived in India on 16 February 1934 and was shortly afterwards attached to the 2nd battalion of the Prince of Wales Volunteers (South Lancashire) regiment at Allahabad.

On 12 March 1935, he was admitted into the Indian Army and was posted to the 3rd Cavalry at Meerut. His seniority as a Second Lieutenant was later antedated to on 31 August 1933. He was attached to the Royal Indian Army Service Corps in early 1940 and later permanently transferred. He served in Kohat, Fort Sandeman, and Risalpur. He was promoted to Lieutenant on 30 November 1935 and to Captain on 31 August 1941.

== Military career ==
Hamid fought in Burma in World War II, where his eyes were badly injured. He retreated from Rangoon and was evacuated from Shewbo to Calcutta. In 1943, after being declared fit for duty, he joined the Command and Staff College in Quetta for his Senior Instructor experience. Field Marshal Claude Auchinleck appointed Hamid his Private Secretary on 28 March 1946 and Hamid played an influential role in the decision making by Auchinleck.

His career led up to the Partition of India in 1947. He also worked both with Muhammad Ali Jinnah and Liaquat Ali Khan during the early years of ISI in Pakistan.

After one such intelligence briefing by Syed Shahid Hamid:

"Prime Minister Liaquat Ali Khan addressed a public rally in which he made his famous gesture of showing his clenched fist ('mukkah') to India. His clenched fist galvanized the nation and became a symbol of its defiance. Nehru was compelled to back down, claiming that India never had any war-like intentions and he also offered to sign a 'No War' pact with Pakistan. In those early years of Pakistan, it was probably the ISI's finest hour".

== Founding Inter-Services Intelligence ==
When Pakistan was created, he opted to join the Pakistan Army. Lieutenant-Colonel Hamid and former British Indian Army Major General Sir Walter Cawthorn, then Deputy Chief of Staff of the Pakistan Army, were Inter Services Intelligence co-creators. The Australian-born Cawthorn succeeded Hamid as head of the ISI after Lieutenant-Colonel Hamid's promotion.

== Post-ISI Senior appointments ==
Hamid retired during the imposition of martial law in 1958, later serving as a minister on the Cabinet of Pakistan from 1978 to 1981.

== Post-retirement ==
He became a patron of the Aligarh Old Boys Association and established Sir Syed School and Sir Syed Science College for boys and girls at Tipu Road, Rawalpindi. As an author, he wrote one of the early books on Hunza after first visiting in 1954 when the valley was only accessible on horseback or on foot.

Hamid spent his later years writing and researching books. He wrote six books on the Northern Areas, the politics of partition and the Pakistan army, and an autobiography. His son, Major General Syed Ali Hamid, continues his father's legacy as an author.

Shahid Hamid had numerous close friends in England, where he invariably spent the summer. 'Shaigan', his home in Rawalpindi, became very popular with foreign diplomats, journalists and military men. British cabinet ministers and US secretaries of state were also frequent visitors.

He maintained a close friendship with Field Marshal Sir Claude Auchinleck, whose mentorship and kindness he and other British Indian veterans enjoyed greatly.
