= Imtiaz Ahmed (brigadier) =

Pakistani military officer (1935–2025)

- Born: 4 June 1935; Gujranwala, Punjab, British India
- Died: 18 June 2025 (aged 90); CMH Rawalpindi
- Military career
- Branch: Pakistan Army
- Service years: 1960–1989
- Rank: Brigadier
- Nicknames: Cat (Dalla); Bobcat (Baghar Dalla); Green-eyed Jackal
- Service number: PA–6280
- Unit: Pakistan Army Corps of Engineers
- Commands: DG Intelligence Bureau; Director JCIB
- Conflicts: Indo-Pakistani War of 1965; Indo-Pakistani War of 1971; Operation Midnight Jackal; Operation Clean-up
- Awards: Tamgha-e-Imtiaz; Sitara-e-Basalat
- Other work: Intelligence commentator; Private Security Contractor; Chairman of the Network Television Marketing

Imtiaz Ahmed (Note: Urdu:امتیاز احمد) (4 June 1935 – 18 June 2025) commonly known as Imtiaz Billa, was a Pakistani retired military officer and spy who served as the director-general of the Intelligence Bureau from 1990 to 1993.

After a brief time in Combat Engineering in the Pakistan Army, his career was mostly spent at the Inter-Services Intelligence (ISI) agency, where he was responsible for running internal security before serving in the civilian Intelligence Bureau. In 1989, his military commission was discharged when he was implicated in the Operation Midnight Jackal political scandal in trying to sabotage then-Pakistani Prime Minister Benazir Bhutto's administration.

In 1993, General Asif Nawaz Janjua's widow accused Shehbaz Sharif, Chaudhary Nisar Ali Khan, and Brigadier Imtiaz of being behind her husband's death.

In 2001, Ahmed was convicted by the anti-corruption court when NAB prosecuted him on monetary embezzlement. Ahmed is a controversial figure in Pakistan, having been accused of involvement in the custodial death of Communist Party of Pakistan leader Nazeer Abbasi in 1980. He was later accused of having foreknowledge of the plane crash that resulted in the death of President Muhammad Zia-ul-Haq, CJCSC Gen. Akhtar Abdur Rahman and other dignitaries in 1988.

== Biography ==
Imtiaz Ahmed was born into a Kashmiri family in Gujranwala, Punjab in British India on 4 June 1935, according to the Indian author, P.C. Joshi. After matriculation, he joined the Pakistan Army and entered the Pakistan Military Academy in Kakul. He decided to attend the Military College of Engineering in Risalpur. He graduated with a Bachelor of Science (B.S.) in civil engineering, and earned a commission as a Second lieutenant (2nd-Lt.) in the Pakistan Army Corps of Engineers in 1960.

His career was largely spent in the Army Corps of Engineers, and he served on the combat engineering formations during the Indo-Pakistani War of 1965, Pakistan's second war with India, and Indo-Pakistani War of 1971 their third war with India. After 1971, Ahmed was directed to attend the staff course at the Command and Staff College in Quetta.

Due to his cunning and greenish 'feline' eye color, Ahmed was well known by his codename in the ISI as "billa" (the male cat).

In the late 1970s, he joined the Inter-Services Intelligence (ISI) as a security analyst and remained associated with Pakistan's intelligence community for many years. In 1979, as a Major, Ahmed was posted on a security assignment to the Karachi Nuclear Power Plant (KANUPP), involved in running background checks and providing covert security to the technicians working on the power plant. In 1979, he became aware of a Central Intelligence Agency (CIA) 'mole' working as an engineer, who was trying to seek security details on the commercial nuclear power plant for sabotage purposes.

After thoroughly running background checks, Ahmad identified the suspected mole, and that eventually led to 'Operation Rising Sun', a sting operation that resulted in the successful arrest and conviction of a local Pakistani CIA agent, declaration of a few undercover CIA agents and diplomats at the U.S. Consulate General in Karachi as persona non-grata, and their return to the United States.

The details and veracity of this assignment has been criticized in an editorial written in Dawn, whose investigations identified the engineer who was working for the Karachi Electric (KE) electric power transmission, and who had been a prominent member of the Pakistan Peoples Party, not working for the KANUPP nuclear power plant as claimed by Ahmed.

After the 1990 Pakistani general election was held, and Nawaz Sharif was forming his first ministry, Imtiaz Ahmed was re-appointed as the DG Intelligence Bureau. In 1992, he aided in launching of the Operation Clean-up armed operation to cleanse Karachi of "anti-social" elements, and ultimately targeting the Muttahida Qaumi Movement (MQM) once the Jinnahpur conspiracy to partition Karachi from Sindh was unearthed.

After the resignations of Prime Minister Sharif and President Ghulam Ishaq Khan, Ahmed resigned from the directorship of the Intelligence Bureau. He termed his resignation as "on principle" on 19 April 1992.

In 1997, Ahmed was appointed by Prime Minister Sharif as Director-General of the Federal Investigation Agency but the appointment did not come through. In October 1997, Ahmed took over the chairmanship of Network Television Marketing, appointed by its board of directors amid controversy when NTM's chairman Faisal Sher Jan was fired from the channel. He chaired the channel until 1999.

After the coup of General Musharraf in 1999, Brigadier Imtiaz kept a low profile until his death in 2025.

In 2001, he was sentenced to eight years imprisonment for corruption charges, and was released in 2008–09.

On 21 September 2010, Imtiaz Ahmed was again arrested along with Adnan Khawaja, the former chairman of the Oil & Gas Development Company (OGDC), and was shifted to Adiala Jail. In a Supreme Court bench headed by then-Chief Justice of Pakistan Iftikhar Muhammad Chaudhry, who heard the NRO implementation case, Ahmed was arrested from the court by order of the Supreme Court during the hearing of a case relating to the implementation of the National Reconciliation Ordinance (NRO).

On 25 September 2010, the Supreme Court eventually released Ahmed as he already had served his time. His release was given on grounds of his age and medical condition, as he reportedly suffered from coronary artery disease.

He died on 18 June 2025 in CMH Rawalpindi after a prolonged illness.

== Secrecy: policy and secrets ==
In 1980, Lieutenant-Colonel (Lt-Col.) Ahmed joined the Joint Counterintelligence Bureau (JCIB), mainly working in counterintelligence management and overseeing anti-communist operations in Sindh.

In 1981, he began investigating the militant Al-Zulfiqar group, after the 1981 Pakistan International Airlines hijacking, eventually expanding their spying on the leaders of the MRD led by Benazir Bhutto in 1982–85.

From 1983 to 1988, he also monitored the anti-communist judicial probe that implicated the journalists Jam Saqi and Sohail Sangi, and harboured doubts of foreign funding of the MRD alliance led by Benazir Bhutto. Over this judicial probe, the Communist Party of Pakistan politicians leveled accusations of Ahmed's CI Bureau in Sindh of wrongfully investigating communist Nazeer Abbasi's political ambitions, and whose custody resulted in his death at the hands of the Sindh Police.

In 1986–87, Col. Ahmed was appointed the Director-General of the Intelligence Bureau before being posted to take over the directorship of the JCIB in Islamabad when Lieutenant-General (Lt-Gen.) Akhtar Abdur Rahman became DG ISI

In 1988, Brig. Ahmed was appointed director of the Political Wing of the ISI in Islamabad, managing the country's internal security and tried uniting the Pakistan National Alliance conservative mass against the left-oriented Pakistan Peoples Party (PPP). Due to the complaints of Naseerullah Babar, Security Adviser at the Interior Ministry, Brig. Ahmad was rotated back to the Corps of Engineers on a construction engineering assignment in Risalpur, but his skills of intelligence management and extraction was valuable, so he eventually found a way to secretly serve in the Intelligence Bureau.

In 1989, Brig. Imtiaz, in a secret conversation with Major Amir Khan, talked on sponsoring the Members of Parliament (MPs) belonging to the PPP to bring about a vote of no-confidence movement to remove Prime Minister Benazir Bhutto in order to bring the Pakistan Muslim League (N) (PML(N)), led by its then-President Fida Mohammad Khan and his chief secretary Nawaz Sharif, into the administration. The plan backfired when the conversation was apparently videotaped by the IB and ISI, and was released to the public, which eventually led to General Mirza Aslam Beg, then-Army Chief, to allow Military Intelligence (MI) to conduct the inquiry in such manner.

Both Brig. Ahmed and Major Amir Khan were discharged from their military commissions in 1989. The inquiry remains classified since it is still unclear who the real culprit behind the plot was, or was it under the instructions of the DG ISI Shamsur Rahman Kallu.

After his discharge in 1989, Ahmed was reportedly employed by then-Chief Minister of Punjab, Nawaz Sharif, as his Additional Chief Secretary in the Government of Punjab, which he served as until 1990.

== Director of IB (1990–93) and Later work ==
After the 1990 Pakistani general election was held, and Nawaz Sharif was forming his first ministry, Imtiaz Ahmed was re-appointed as the DG Intelligence Bureau. In 1992, he aided in launching of the Operation Clean-up armed operation to cleanse Karachi of "anti-social" elements, and ultimately targeting the Muttahida Qaumi Movement (MQM) once the Jinnahpur conspiracy to partition Karachi from Sindh was unearthed.

After the resignations of Prime Minister Sharif and President Ghulam Ishaq Khan, Ahmed resigned from the directorship of the Intelligence Bureau. He termed his resignation as "on principle" on 19 April 1992.

In 1997, Ahmed was appointed by Prime Minister Sharif as Director-General of the Federal Investigation Agency but the appointment did not come through. In October 1997, Ahmed took over the chairmanship of Network Television Marketing, appointed by its board of directors amid controversy when NTM's chairman Faisal Sher Jan was fired from the channel. He chaired the channel until 1999.

After the coup of General Musharraf in 1999, Brigadier Imtiaz kept a low profile until his death in 2025.

In 2001, he was sentenced to eight years imprisonment for corruption charges, and was released in 2008–09.

On 21 September 2010, Imtiaz Ahmed was again arrested along with Adnan Khawaja, the former chairman of the Oil & Gas Development Company (OGDC), and was shifted to Adiala Jail. In a Supreme Court bench headed by then-Chief Justice of Pakistan Iftikhar Muhammad Chaudhry, who heard the NRO implementation case, Ahmed was arrested from the court by order of the Supreme Court during the hearing of a case relating to the implementation of the National Reconciliation Ordinance (NRO).

On 25 September 2010, the Supreme Court eventually released Ahmed as he already had served his time. His release was given on grounds of his age and medical condition, as he reportedly suffered from coronary artery disease.

== Controversies and allegations ==
The Pakistan Peoples Party (PPP) secured the plurality after the 1993 Pakistani general election, and Prime Minister Bhutto opened the investigation and inquiry when authorizing the arrest warrants of Imtiaz Ahmed on charges of indulging in illegal activities in 1994. The case against him was marked on the political motives, and he was later released due to lack of evidences.

After the 1999 Pakistani coup d'état by General Pervez Musharraf, the inquiries led by NAB indicted Ahmed on large-scale corruption and misappropriation of funds while serving as the Director of IB, eventually finding him guilty in 2001. He was sentenced to eight years imprisonment for corruption, and was released in 2008–09.

On 21 September 2010, Imtiaz Ahmed was again arrested along with Adnan Khawaja, the former chairman of the Oil & Gas Development Company (OGDC), and was shifted to Adiala Jail. In a Supreme Court bench headed by then-Chief Justice of Pakistan Iftikhar Muhammad Chaudhry, who heard the NRO implementation case, Ahmed was arrested from the court by order of the Supreme Court during the hearing of a case relating to the implementation of the National Reconciliation Ordinance (NRO).

On 25 September 2010, the Supreme Court eventually released Ahmed as he already had served his time. His release was given on grounds of his age and medical condition, as he reportedly suffered from coronary artery disease.

=== Foreknowledge of Bahawalpur incident ===
In 2009 Humayun Akhtar Khan, the former Commerce Minister and son of Gen. Akhtar Abdur Rahman, had leveled accusations when he reportedly marked: Brig. Imtiaz is the man who encouraged my father to board on the C-130 aircraft which later met an accident. I ask Brig. Imtiaz to explain what led him to play a role in my father's killing, Humayun Akhtar maintained.

=== Jinnahpur plan controversy ===
After his release in 2009, Ahmed became an intelligence commentator and gave several television interviews on intelligence management. He revealed that the Jinnahpur conspiracy was fabricated while giving more information on the Operation Midnight Jackal secret funding of political parties against the PPP.

== See also ==
- Hyderabad tribunal
- Mehran bank scandal
