= Asghar Khan legal case =

Air Marshal (Retd.) Asghar Khan vs General (Retd.) Mirza Aslam Beg & others
- Emblem of the Supreme Court
- Court: Supreme Court of Pakistan
- Full case name: Human Rights Case No. 19 of 1996: Application by Air Marshal (Retd.) Muhammad Asghar Khan
- Argued: 8 March 2012
- Started: 1996; 30 years ago
- Decided: 19 October 2012

Case history
- Prior action: Petition filed in 1996 by Air Marshal (Retd.) Asghar Khan under Article 184(3) of the Constitution of Pakistan
- Subsequent actions: Federal government directed to take action against Gen (Retd.) Aslam Beg and Lt-Gen (Retd.) Asad Durrani; case referred to FIA and NAB

Holding
- Military officers unlawfully distributed funds to influence the 1990 general elections by creating the IJI and appointing Nawaz Sharif as its leader.; Superior officers who gave or failed to prevent unlawful orders are culpable.; President Ghulam Ishaq Khan had no constitutional authority to direct such actions or form an election cell.; All politicians who received the illegal payments must be prosecuted

Court membership
- Judges sitting: Chief Justice Iftikhar Chaudhry; Justice Jawwad S. Khawaja; Justice Khilji Arif Hussain

Case opinions
- Decision by: Chief Justice Iftikhar Chaudhry
- Majority: 3
- Dissent: None

Laws applied
- Constitution of Pakistan (Articles 184(3), 243, 244); precedent: Sindh High Court Bar Association case (2009)

Keywords
- Election interference, ISI, military accountability, civilian supremacy, constitutional law, 1990 general elections, unlawful orders

Air Marshal (Retd.) Asghar Khan vs General (Retd.) Mirza Aslam Beg & others, simply known as the Asghar Khan Case, was a landmark decision of the Supreme Court of Pakistan in which the court ruled that former chief of Army Staff General Mirza Aslam Beg and former director general of inter-services intelligence Asad Durrani, defamed the Pakistan Armed Forces by rigging the 1990 general election in favour of Nawaz Sharif, adding that doling out money to a group of politicians was an individual act rather than of the institution itself. The verdict also said that the duty of secret agencies was to protect the borders instead of forming election cells.

== Background ==
On 20 April 1994, Interior Minister of Pakistan Naseerullah Babar disclosed in the National Assembly that Yunus Habib, the chief operator of Mehran Bank Limited, misappropriated Rs2.10 billion through fake accounts. He explained how large amounts of money were taken from intelligence funds and then routed through Younus Habib, the owner of the private Mehran Bank, to different conservative politicians and military officials to create the Islami Jamhoori Ittehad (IJI) alliance and appoint Nawaz Sharif as its leader against Prime Minister Benazir Bhutto to ensure she would not get re-elected in the 1990 Pakistani general election. Babar stated that the principal recipient was former chief of Army Staff General Mirza Aslam Beg, who received PKR 140 million.

The scandal was uncovered when the new director-general of the ISI, Lt. General Javed Ashraf Qazi, decided to transfer the intelligence funds back to private banks owned by the government and Mehran Bank could not return the money because of the bank's poor financial condition. Babar's public comments supported the growing media investigation, which led to a lawsuit by retired Air Marshal Asghar Khan in the Supreme Court.

The trial lasted for nearly two decades, leading to a 2012 judgment from the Supreme Court of Pakistan, which ruled that General Mirza Aslam Beg and Lt. General Asad Durrani had violated the constitution for misusing funds during their tenure, and that Younus Habib was guilty of fraud and embezzlement.

== Proceedings (1996–2012) ==
The case dragged on for 16 years, cycling through multiple benches and Chief Justices. In May 1998, the court prepared a sealed report on the functioning of the Inter-Services Intelligence (ISI) and the affidavits of Generals Beg and Durrani. However, the report was subsequently sealed and became difficult to access. When the case was revived in earnest under Chief Justice Iftikhar Chaudhry's tenure, accessing these sealed records became one of the bench's early procedural concerns. Over the course of proceedings, the court sent repeated notices to key respondents, including Asad Durrani, who was intermittently abroad or unresponsive. The court also sought the unsealing of the 1998 inquiry and obtained military and intelligence records relating to the accounts through which funds had allegedly passed, including Account No. 313, titled "Survey and Construction Group Karachi," maintained by Military Intelligence.

In a March 2012 hearing, the Supreme Court looked into an earlier directive where they directed the Attorney General to provide the inquiry commission reports of Habib Bank and Mehran Bank. It was reported that both inquiry commission reports, the Mehran Bank report dated June 17, 1994, and the Habib Bank commission dated January 11, 1996, had both gone missing, despite both banks' playing a significant part in financing the 1990 elections. Justice Khilji Arif Hussain remarked, "it seems that the quarters concerned are deliberately hiding these reports."

Younus Habib testified in front of Chief Justice Iftikhar Chaudhry on 8 March 2012, that he handed over Rs3.5 million in cash directly to Nawaz Sharif at his residence in Lahore after the 1990 general elections. He also claimed that on 27 September 1993, Rs2.5 million were sent to Shahbaz Sharif through a Telegraphic Transfer by Asif Jamshed. The Sharif brothers deny the veracity of Younus Habib's testimony, however, both Gen. Aslam Beg and Lt. Gen Asad Durrani have, in their separate affidavits, corroborated the claim made by Habib that Nawaz Sharif was one of the individuals who received the funding organised by him and disbursed on the orders of the Inter-Services Intelligence (ISI) and President Ghulam Ishaq. Additionally, Habib had spent approximately four years in jail at this time and has also testified that he was contacted and asked to facilitate the transfer of Rs350 million for the former Army Chief prior to the 1990 General Elections.

== Detailed judgment ==
The detailed judgment of the Supreme Court was read by Dr. Faqir Hussain, Registrar of the Court, on 8 November 2012. It explained why the three-judge bench had ruled that the 1990 general elections were "polluted by the dishing out of Rs140 million to a particular group of politicians only to deprive the people of being represented by people chosen by them."

== Public statements ==
In a 2012 interview with Dawn, retired Lieutenant General Hamid Gul, who served as the Director-General of the Inter-Services Intelligence (ISI) at the time the Islami Jamhuri Ittihad (IJI) was formed in 1988, admitted his role in creating the alliance and credited General Mirza Aslam Beg with assisting in its formation. Gul also said that he was not afraid if any charges were brought against him and said he did not fear being hanged.
