= Younis Habib =

Pakistani banker (c. 1940–2019)

- یونس حبیب
- Born: 1940; British India
- Died: April 24, 2019 (aged 79); Karachi, Pakistan
- Resting place: Gizri Graveyard, Karachi
- Occupation: Banker
- Years active: 1963–1994
- Employer(s): Habib Bank Limited (1963–1991); Mehran Bank (1991–1994)
- Known for: Mehran Bank scandal Asghar Khan case
- Children: 4 (including Tariq Habib)

Younis Habib (c. 1940 – 24 April 2019) was a Pakistani banker who founded the now-defunct Mehran Bank and was a central figure in the Mehran Bank scandal and the related Asghar Khan case, two of the largest political-financial scandals in the history of Pakistan. He admitted before the Supreme Court of Pakistan in 2012 that, at the direction of the military and intelligence establishment, he had arranged the disbursement of funds to politicians of the Islami Jamhoori Ittehad (IJI) to defeat the Pakistan Peoples Party (PPP) led by Benazir Bhutto in the 1990 Pakistani general election.

== Career ==
=== Early career ===
Habib began his career in 1963 as a clerk at Habib Bank Limited (HBL), then Pakistan's largest commercial bank, and rose through the ranks over nearly three decades to become its zonal chief for Sindh and eventually its provincial head, retiring from HBL in 1991. In 1991, the State Bank of Pakistan received a report from HBL alleging that Habib's banking practices as Sindh zonal chief had exposed the bank to potential losses of between Rs. 4 billion and Rs. 6 billion, although no immediate disciplinary action was taken.

=== Mehran Bank ===
In November 1991, with the support of the then Chief Minister of Sindh Jam Sadiq Ali, Habib obtained a banking licence to establish Mehran Bank, of which he became the founding chief operating officer (COO). The bank opened branches in Karachi, Lahore, Mirpurkhas, Peshawar, Quetta and Rawalpindi.

Mehran Bank quickly became embroiled in financial irregularities. In 1994, the then Interior Minister Naseerullah Babar told the National Assembly that Habib had misappropriated approximately Rs. 5 billion from the bank, including through transfers to fictitious accounts and against fraudulent loans. Habib was arrested on 7 April 1994 on charges of misappropriating the sale proceeds of Dollar Bearer Certificates amounting to approximately US$36.7 million.

On 14 December 1995, the Special Court for Offences in Banks in Sindh convicted him of fraud and embezzlement and sentenced him to ten years of rigorous imprisonment along with a fine of Rs. 36.7 billion. In 1995, the State Bank of Pakistan ordered Mehran Bank's amalgamation with the National Bank of Pakistan (NBP); in 1996 NBP had to make full provision for Mehran's liabilities, resulting in a net loss of Rs. 1.26 billion for the year.

== Asghar Khan case ==
In June 1996, Tehrik-e-Istiqlal chief Air Marshal (retired) Asghar Khan filed a human rights petition in the Supreme Court of Pakistan alleging that the army chief General Mirza Aslam Beg, the Director-General of Inter-Services Intelligence Lt. General Asad Durrani and the then President Ghulam Ishaq Khan had used funds arranged through Habib to finance the Islami Jamhoori Ittehad ahead of the 1990 general election in order to defeat the Pakistan Peoples Party. Habib, along with Beg and Durrani, was named as a respondent.

After more than two decades in which he largely lived out of the public eye, Habib was summoned by the Supreme Court in March 2012 to record his statement. Before the court, Habib admitted that he had arranged Rs. 350–400 million from Habib Bank Limited at the direction of senior military officials, and that the funds were distributed among politicians opposing the PPP. Among those he named as beneficiaries were Nawaz Sharif, Pir Pagara, Ghulam Mustafa Jatoi, Malik Meraj Khalid, Muhammad Khan Junejo, Jam Sadiq Ali and Farooq Leghari; several of those named subsequently denied the allegations.

On 19 October 2012, the Supreme Court issued a 141-page verdict declaring that the Inter-Services Intelligence had unlawfully manipulated the 1990 election and ordering legal proceedings against Beg, Durrani and others. The Chief Justice noted that Rs. 140 million had been disbursed through Habib and asked who bore responsibility for the operation, observing that prima facie it had been carried out at the behest of the presidency. In June 2019, weeks after Habib's death, the Federal Investigation Agency (FIA) reported to the Supreme Court that, owing to the death of the principal accused and several other respondents, the allegations regarding receipt of funds by politicians could not be substantiated to evidentiary standards.

== Imprisonment ==
Habib served three years of his ten-year sentence before being released. In 2006, the National Accountability Bureau (NAB) announced that Habib had agreed to settle Rs. 1.6 billion of his outstanding liability through the sale of his benami property, a plot in the Blue Area of Islamabad that was sold to the National Logistics Cell for Rs. 2.2 billion, with the proceeds transferred to NBP to help resolve the loan defaults of the defunct Mehran Bank.
