= Operation Midnight Jackal =

Pakistani political scandal

Operation Midnight Jackal, or simply known as Midnight Jackal, was a first of two major political scandals that took place in the first term of Pakistani Prime Minister Benazir Bhutto in 1988–89 that was a plot of ISI's Internal Wing to assist the vote of no-confidence movement in the Parliament to pave the way for new elections in favor of conservative politicians.

== Background ==
Following the death and state funeral of President Zia-ul-Haq, Benazir Bhutto was elected as the Prime Minister of Pakistan after successfully campaigning in the nationwide general elections held in 1988.

As early as 1989, the army staff under General Aslam Beg, then–Chief of Army Staff, had been at odds on the policy matters relating the handling of the security situation in Afghanistan, immediately after Prime Minister Bhutto removed Hamid Gul from the intelligence agency over his failure to sustain Pakistan's national interests in the country. According to the ISI's insider information, it was President Ghulam Ishaq Khan and Gen. Mirza Aslam Beg who wanted the administrative changes in the civilian government to control the government in their favor.

In September 1989, the Internal Wing of the ISI, allegedly working under the directions from Gen. Aslam Beg, attempted to mount an effort to bring the vote of no-confidence movement in the Parliament in order to remove Benazir Bhutto, which would force new nationwide elections in 1990. This covert military intelligence program actively ran under Brig. Imtiaz Ahmad, then Additional Director General of the Internal Wing, who oversaw with Major Amir (the FIA agent on counterintelligence).

== Counterintelligence and exposure ==
Despite its covert nature and secrecy, the Intelligence Bureau (IB) under its director Masood Khan was able to track the program based on the benefitted secret information on the activities of the Internal Wing on political matters. Eventually, the Intelligence Bureau was able to tapped the telephones and further videotaping the conversation of Brig. Imtiaz Ahmad and Major Amir trying to financially influence and convince the two senior parliamentarians belonging on the platform of the Pakistan Peoples Party (PPP).

When the scandal exposed in the civil society by the IB through the news media, the major allegations were directed toward Gen. Aslam Beg, then-army chief, and also implicating President Ghulam Ishaq Khan and S. R. Kallu, then-Director ISI.

Efforts to authorize the court martial of the Gen. Beg failed due to lack of evidence as Gen. Beg denied his involvement but authorized the Pakistan Army's JAG Corps to establish the court martial hearings of Brig. Imtiaz, who was dismissed from his one-star general rank in the Army. Military investigations and prosecution leveled charges and held Amir Khan responsible of this scandal, who later testified in his court hearings that the primary objective were to support Nawaz Sharif as the establishment was said to have "liked" or preferred Sharif as a country's prime minister, and was a part of his political camp.

As Amir Khan told his military lawyers that: "Nawaz Sharif was more acceptable to the [Pakistan] Army than Benazir Bhutto, and the establishment was against every leader who had people's mandate behind them. They prefer weak leaders like Sharif, which the Army could control".

Despite the fact the scandal was exposed, the conspiracies against Prime Minister Benazir Bhutto continued until another political scandal was reported in 1990.

== See also ==
- Mehran Bank scandal
