= Mehrangate =

1990 political scandal in Pakistan

Mehrangate, also known as the Mehran bank scandal, was a major political scandal that took place during the government of Prime Minister Benazir Bhutto in 1990. It led to the filing of the Supreme Court case Air Marshal (Retd.) Asghar Khan vs General (Retd.) Mirza Aslam Beg & others.

Leading up to the 1990 Pakistani general election, the Chief of Army Staff General Mirza Aslam Beg, Director-General of Inter-Services Intelligence Lt. General Asad Durrani, and Lt. General Hamid Gul conspired against the election campaign of Benazir Bhutto. Using taxpayers' money, they formed the Islami Jamhoori Ittehad (IJI), appointed Nawaz Sharif as its leader and bribed politicians to prevent Bhutto's reelection. From the official bank accounts of the Ministry of Defence (MoD), taxpayer funds were directed and transferred to purchase the loyalty of politicians to compete with the Pakistan Peoples Party, which was much organized at that time.

The nature of the Sharif-Beg collusion was discovered by Javed Ashraf Qazi, then-Director ISI, who wanted to move the taxpayers' funds into another account but the banks failed to meet the requests, leading the new director of opening the investigation on missing funds. With media investigation in this matter further grew, the scandal became public with Asghar Khan filing a lawsuit at the Supreme Court of Pakistan against the IDA and the Pakistan Peoples Party in 1994. The case hearings and investigations went on for several years until 2012 when the Supreme Court of Pakistan eventually found Nawaz Sharif, Aslam Beg, Asad Durrani, bankers, and other conservative politicians from the PML(N) responsible and guilty of their acts.

== Background ==
After the exposure of the first scandal by the Intelligence Bureau (IB) in 1989, President Ghulam Ishaq Khan eventually used his constitutional reserve powers that dismissed the first administration of Prime Minister Benazir Bhutto, charging the Benazir's administration of nepotism, political corruption, poor economic growth, law and order, and foreign affairs, in 1990.

After the Election Commission (ECP) announced the timeline schedule of nationwide general elections, the ISI methodically and systematically released taxpayer's funds to the IDA's conservative politicians. The authorization for the taxpayer's funds came from Lt-Gen. Asad Durrani, then-Director ISI, who enjoyed the support from President Ghulam Ishaq Khan and, allegedly Gen. Beg, the army chief at that time. During this time, the monetary embezzlement took place was reported around of the sum of ₨. 5.6Bn (approx. € 160 million at that time), and US$ 39 million was later additionally deposited in the intelligence funds.

Initiated by Pakistan Army's Chief of Army Staff General Mirza Aslam Beg with the alleged support of President Ghulam Ishaq Khan, payments of up to PKR 140 million were made by the Inter-Services Intelligence (ISI) Director-General Lieutenant-General Asad Durrani via the owner of Mehran Bank, Yunus Habib. Intelligence funds were deposited in Mehran bank in 1992 propping up what was an insolvent bank as a favor to its owner for help in loaning money to the Inter-Services Intelligence in 1990 that was used in the creation of the right wing alliance Islami Jamhoori Ittehad (IJI) and bankrolling the campaigns of many opponents of the PPP.

The scandal subsequently broke after the new ISI Director-General Lieutenant-General Javed Ashraf Qazi decided to transfer the intelligence fund back to state owned banks as per official rules. Mehran Bank was unable to return the money due to its poor financial state and collapsed. It was later discovered that large sums had been siphoned off to 39 fictitious parties.

In 1995, Mehran Bank was amalgamated with the National Bank and in 1996 the NBP had to make full provision for Mehran's liabilities which resulted in a net loss that year to the bank of Rs 1.260 billion.

Yunus Habib was arrested on 7 April 1994 for misappropriation in the sale proceeds of the Dollar Bearer Certificates. On Dec 14, 1995, Younus Habib was convicted of fraud and embezzlement and given a sentence of 10 years rigorous imprisonment by the Special Court for Offences in Banks in Sindh. On April 20, 1994, giving details about the payments made by Habib to generals, politicians and political parties, the then Interior Minister, Naseerullah Babar, told the National Assembly that the main beneficiary of his largess was former army chief General Mirza Aslam Beg who received Rs140 million.

== Convictions ==
In March 2012, Pakistan's Supreme Court summoned Younis Habib, (Mirza Aslam Beg), and Asad Durrani to testify in response to a lawsuit filed by Air Marshall Asghar Khan in 1996. On 19 October 2012, the Supreme Court tribunal found Beg and Durrani guilty of violating the Constitution for their roles in the bribery. Beg has evaded testifying before the court, arguing his constitutional rights were violated by the court's finding before he could testify.

== See also ==
- Operation Midnight Jackal
