= Hamid Gul =

Pakistani director of Intelligence (1936–2015)

Hamid Gul HI(M) SI(M) SBt
- حمید گل
- Official military portrait as DGISI

12th Director-General of Inter-Services Intelligence
- In office 29 March 1987 – 27 May 1989
- Preceded by: Akhtar Abdur Rahman
- Succeeded by: Shamsur Rahman Kallu

Corps Commander II Corps
- In office May 1989 – January 1992

Director General Military Intelligence of Pakistan
- In office 1983–1987

Personal details
- Born: 20 November 1936 Sargodha, Punjab Province (British India)
- Died: 15 August 2015 (aged 78) Murree, Punjab, Pakistan
- Relatives: Ahmad Awais (brother-in-law)
- Education: Government College Lahore; Pakistan Military Academy

Military service
- Allegiance: Pakistan
- Branch/service: Pakistan Army
- Years of service: 1956–1993
- Rank: Lieutenant General
- Unit: 19th Lancers
- Commands: II Corps (Pakistan); Military Intelligence of Pakistan; Inter-Services Intelligence
- Battles/wars: Indo-Pakistani War of 1965; Indo-Pakistani War of 1971; Soviet–Afghan War; Afghan Civil War (1989-1992); Battle of Jalalabad (1989); Insurgency in Punjab; Insurgency in Jammu and Kashmir
- Awards: Hilal-i-Imtiaz (Military); Sitara-i-Imtiaz (Military); Sitara-e-Basalat

Hamid Gul (Urdu: حمید گل, 20 November 1936 – 15 August 2015) was a Pakistani military officer and defence analyst. A three-star general, Gul was notable for serving as the Director-General of the Inter-Services Intelligence (ISI), Pakistan's premier intelligence agency, between 1987 and 1989. During his tenure, Gul played an instrumental role in directing ISI support to the Afghan mujahideen against Soviet forces in return for funds and weapons from the US, during the Soviet–Afghan War, in co-operation with the CIA.

In addition, Gul is widely credited for expanding covert support to Kashmiri militants operating in Indian-administered Kashmir from 1989 onwards, diverting focus from the fallout of the Soviet war. Gul earned a reputation as a "godfather" of Pakistani geostrategic policies. For his role against India, he has been considered by A. S. Dulat, former director of R&AW, as "the most dangerous and infamous ISI chief in Indian eyes." He later turned against the United States and following an escalation of the Kashmir militancy in India and the Taliban insurgency in Afghanistan, the United States accused him of having ties to Islamic terrorist groups, notably Al-Qaeda and the Lashkar-e-Taiba. One of his nicknames was "Father of the Taliban".

In 1988, Gul, with the support of general's Aslam Beg and Asad Durrani, played a key role in forming the Islami Jamhoori Ittehad (IJI), a conservative political alliance created to prevent the Pakistan Peoples Party (PPP) led by Prime Minister Benazir Bhutto from winning the 1990 Pakistani general election. He appointed Nawaz Sharif as the leader of the IJI, who would later win the election with the help of the ISI.

On 15 August 2015, he died after suffering a brain haemorrhage.

== Early life and education ==
Hamid Gul was born on 20 November 1936 in Sargodha in the Punjab Province, British India into a Punjabi-Pashtun family to parents Muhammad Khan and his wife, who originated from Buner Tehsil in Swat District.

Gul ancestrally descended from the Yusufzai tribe of Pashtuns. His father, who was a Subedar-major in the British Indian Army, moved from Swat to Lahore before settling down in Sargodha, where he got arable land, his grandfather was a Khilafat Movement activist while his great-grandfather Faiz Khan participated in the jihad of Syed Ahmad Barelvi and Shah Ismail Dehlvi.

He got his early education from a school in his village. He then received admission into Government College Lahore, before being admitted to Pakistan Military Academy Kakul.

== Army career ==
Hamid Gul was commissioned in the Pakistan Army in October 1956 with the 18th PMA Long Course in the 19th Lancers regiment of the Armoured Corps. He was a squadron commander during the 1965 war with India. He attended the Command and Staff College Quetta in 1968–69. During 1972–1976, Gul directly served under General Muhammad Zia-ul-Haq as a battalion commander, and then as Staff Colonel, when General Zia was GOC, 1st Armoured Division and Commander II Corps at Multan. Thus, Gul had already cemented his ties with General Zia by serving under him when both were officers in the Armoured regiments of the II Corps. Gul was promoted to Brigadier in 1978 and steadily rose to be the Martial Law Administrator of Bahawalpur and then the Commander of the 1st Armoured Division, Multan in 1982, his appointments expressly wished by Zia himself.

Gul was then sent to GHQ as the Director-General Military Intelligence (DGMI) under General Zia, who then nominated him to be the ISI chief succeeding General Akhtar Abdur Rahman in March 1987. He was later replaced as the ISI commander by PM Benazir Bhutto in May 1989 and Gul was transferred as the commander, II Corps in Multan. In this capacity, Gul conducted the Zarb-e-Momin military exercise in November–December 1989, the biggest Pakistan Armed Forces show of muscle since the 1971 Indo-Pakistani War.

General Asif Nawaz upon taking the reins of Pakistan Army in August 1991, transferred Gul as the DG Heavy Industries Taxila. A menial job compared to Gul's stature, Gul refused to take the assignment, an act for which he was retired from the army.

== Director-General of the ISI (1987–1989) ==
=== Afghanistan and the Soviet war ===
During his time as head of the ISI amid the Soviet–Afghan War, Gul planned and executed the operation to capture Jalalabad from the Soviet-backed Afghan army in the spring of 1989 immediately after the Soviet withdrawal. This switch to conventional warfare was seen as a mistake by some since the mujahideen did not have the capacity to capture a major city, and the battle did not yield expected ground results.

However, the Pakistani army was intent on installing a resistance-backed government in Afghanistan, with Jalalabad as their provisional capital, Abdul Rasul Sayyaf as Prime Minister, and Gulbuddin Hekmatyar as Foreign Minister.

Contrary to Pakistani expectations, this battle proved that the Afghan army could fight without Soviet help, and greatly increased the confidence of government supporters. Conversely, the morale of the mujahideen involved in the attack slumped and many local commanders of Hekmatyar and Sayyaf concluded truces with the government. In the words of Brigadier Mohammad Yousef, an officer of the ISI, "the jihad [meaning the plans for Hekmatyar to be installed as prime minister] never recovered from Jalalabad". As a result of this failure, Hamid Gul was sacked by PM Benazir Bhutto and replaced by Shamsur Rahman Kallu, who pursued a more classical policy of support to the rebels fighting in Afghanistan.

=== Domestic politics ===
After the death of General Zia, Gul as ISI chief successfully gathered conservative politicians and helped them create the Nawaz Sharif-led Islami Jamhoori Ittehad (IJI), a centre-right conservative coalition united against the left-leaning Pakistan People's Party (PPP) before the 1988 Pakistani general election. Gul later acknowledged his role in IJI's formation in various interviews for which he was harshly rebuked in one of the editorials of a major Pakistani newspaper, which asked the general to apologise first to the PPP for having done so and after that, apologising for a lack of intelligence because the IJI could not maintain its two-thirds majority for long. After General Zia's death, Sharif's political party – Pakistan Muslim League – split into two factions: the Nawaz led the Zia-loyalist Fida Group against PM Junejo's Pakistan Muslim League (J). The Fida Group later took on the mantle of the PML while the Junejo Group became known as the JIP. The two parties along with seven other right-wing conservative and religious parties united with encouragement and funding from the ISI to form the IJI. The IJI received ₨15 million from Zia loyalists in the ISI, with a substantial role played by Nawaz's ally Gul. The alliance was led by Nawaz and Ghulam Mustafa Jatoi and opposed Benazir Bhutto's PPP in the elections. The IJI gained a majority in Punjab, and Nawaz was elected as the chief minister. Nawaz Sharif became the 12th Prime Minister of Pakistan on 6 November 1990, succeeding Benazir Bhutto, securing a majority in the National Assembly after the 1990 Pakistani general election. His rise to power was the result of an election marred with controversy, with his victory orchestrated with the backing of President Ghulam Ishaq Khan and senior military officials—including Gul and generals Aslam Beg and Asad Durrani (the then head of ISI) who worked to buy the loyalties of politicians using funds from the country's foreign exchange reserves. Support also came from powerful drug barons such as Haji Ayub Afridi, Haji Mirza Iqbal Beg, and Sharif's own brother-in-law, Sohail Zia Butt. Sharif continued to maintain his ties with Iqbal Beg, who was arrested and subsequently released on bail as a result of his association with Sharif. In 1996, Asghar Khan filed a lawsuit challenging the results of the 1990 elections, following the discovery of the Mehran bank scandal. Nearly two decades later in 2012, Beg, Durrani, and Gul, along with banker Yunus Habib, admitted their involvement in manipulating the election. Later that year the Supreme Court, ruling in favour of petitioner Asghar Khan, agreed that the election was rigged and ordered legal action against those responsible. As of 2025, no one has been held accountable.

In late 1994, Gul, Imran Khan and Muhammad Ali Durrani launched Pasban, a breakaway faction of Jamaat-e-Islami, as a "pressure group" in the form of a civil society watchdog. According to Christopher Clary, Assistant Professor of Political Science at the State University of New York-Albany, Khan entered politics in the mid-1990s in open alliance with Gul.

=== Kashmir and Punjab insurgency ===
Gul actively backed Khalistani militants in Indian Punjab. After PM Benazir Bhutto came to power in 1988 and asked him to stop supporting the insurgency in Punjab, he told ger that "keeping Punjab destabilized is equivalent to the Pakistan army having an extra division at no cost to the taxpayers."

Gul was a staunch supporter of the insurgency in Indian-administered Kashmir. He stated, "I am not anti-India. I am against the imperial streak in the Indian psyche. The 1947 riots had a deep impact on my mind. The Indians always lean towards imperial powers. India will give its land when it will be divided into many pieces. India will have to break. If India does not give us our land we will go to war and divide India." He claimed that the only reason that Pakistan has not dismembered India already is because of the possible consequences for Indian Muslims. He explicated the strategy as:

"We have gained a lot because of our offensive in Kashmir. This is a psychological and political offensive that is designed to make India bleed through a thousand cuts."

In mid January 2010, a United Jihad Council meeting in Muzaffarabad chaired by Gul called for reinvigorated jihad until Kashmir was free of "Indian occupation".

=== Pan-Islamism ===
Even if the ISI, under General Akhtar Abdur Rahman, was already aiming beyond the region, for instance establishing contacts with jihadi groups like the Abu Sayyaf in the Philippines, it was under Hamid Gul that the ISI definitely took a pan-Islamist turn, as he not only wished for a Pakistan-led Islamic coalition against India, in his own words "a strategic depth concept that links Pakistan, Iran, Turkey, and Afghanistan in an alliance" which "would be a jeweled Mughal dagger pointed at the Hindu heart", but also called for what he perceived as the liberation of persecuted Muslim groups all over the world, such as the Eritreans, the Bosniaks, the Rohingyas, the Uzbeks and the Uighurs.

At the time of his death, journalist Abbas Nasir, while offering a critical review of his life and career, said that "commitment to jihad - to an Islamic revolution transcending national boundaries, was such that he dreamed one day the "green Islamic flag" would flutter not just over Pakistan and Afghanistan, but also over territories represented by the (former Soviet Union) Central Asian republics."

== Fallout with United States ==
General Gul worked closely with the CIA during the Soviet occupation of Afghanistan, when he was the ISI head. However, he became dispassionate with the United States after it turned its back on Afghanistan following the 1989 Soviet withdrawal, as the United States had promised to help build a prosperous Afghanistan. He was further disconcerted when the US began punishing Pakistan with economic and military sanctions for its secret nuclear program. Gul then went on to declare that "the Muslim world must stand united to confront the U.S. in its so-called war on terrorism, which is in reality a war against Muslims. Let's destroy America wherever its troops are trapped." He said that "I turned against America because they betrayed the Afghan nation", adding "We are not afraid of the Americans, they can't fight on the ground. We are only concerned about their high-altitude bombers.

Originally unnamed in the 9/11 Commission Report, U.S. officials suspected that Gul had warned the Taliban and Osama bin Laden of the impending cruise missile strike (Operation Infinite Reach) on al-Qaeda's training camps in eastern Afghanistan. In a 1998 broadcast interview with Al Jazeera, bin Laden expressed gratitude for the Pakistani government tip-off stating "As for what was said about information reaching us, we, with the help of God, found in Pakistan sympathetic and generous people... We get information from our beloved ones and supporters of jihad against the Americans for the sake of God." When asked if the warning came from official sources, bin Laden responded "I mean the government; groups within the government." U.S. officials also stated that Taliban leaders were told by Gul that he would provide them advanced warning of U.S. missile attacks.

=== 9/11 conspiracy theories ===
General Gul personally met Osama bin Laden in 1993 and refused to label him a terrorist unless and until irrefutable evidence was provided linking him to alleged acts of terrorism. Only days after the September 11 attacks, Gul also stated his belief that the attacks were "clearly an inside job". He later stated that the attacks were the work of the Israeli intelligence agency Mossad to give the United States an excuse to invade the Arab world. and said that "I don't believe it. Within 10 minutes of the second twin tower being hit in the World Trade Center CNN said Osama bin Laden had done it. That was a planned piece of disinformation by the real perpetrators".

In an interview with the Qatar-based English news channel Al Jazeera English, Gul further alleged that the September 11th attacks were planned by the United States government, that al-Qaeda's role was uncertain, and that confidence should be taken in bin Laden's denial of responsibility.

The Americans took my name to the United Nations Security Council sanctions committee but the Chinese intervened and they stopped my name [from] being on the terrorist list. They [the United States] did their best. They have not allowed me, in the year 2000 they did not allow me. That means they were planning at the time 2001. 2001 in my opinion, there is a mystery, it's an enigma. It needs to be resolved, and this is the very basic question: 'Was it al-Qaeda that carried it out?' Osama bin Laden is on record to have twice said that he didn't do that, although he said I pray for the people who carried it out, but [he said] 'I didn't do it'. So that mystery has still to be resolved.

— Hamid Gul, Al Jazeera interview in February 2010

According to The Daily Telegraph, following the killing of Osama bin Laden, Gul opined that US forces had killed him in Afghanistan and moved the body to Abbottabad to humiliate Pakistan.

== Post-retirement career ==
According to Zahid Hussain, in his book Frontline Pakistan, Gul and former army chief General Mirza Aslam Beg were part of the 9 January 2001 Darul Uloom Haqqania Islamic conference held near Peshawar, which was also attended by 300 leaders representing various Islamic groups. The meeting declared it a religious duty of Muslims all over the world to protect the Taliban government of the Islamic Emirate of Afghanistan and Osama bin Laden who was hosted by the Taliban, whom they considered as a 'great Muslim warrior'.

On 12 March 2007, Gul marched alongside activists from the liberal democratic parties and retired former senior military officers against General Pervez Musharraf. General Gul faced down riot police when they tried to arrest him at a rally outside the Supreme Court in Islamabad protesting against attempts to dismiss Chief Justice Iftikhar Muhammad Chaudhry. He turned against the restored Supreme Court chief justice after a bench allowed Musharraf to contest the elections in uniform.

Days after the 2007 Karachi bombing former PM Benazir Bhutto, who survived the attack, in a letter to President Musharaf written on 16 October 2007 named Hamid Gul as one of the four persons including the current Intelligence Bureau (IB) Chief Ijaz Shah, the then chief minister of Punjab Chaudhry Pervaiz Elahi, then chief minister of Sindh Arbab Ghulam Rahim, she suspected were behind the attacks. Gul responded furiously to these claims. He was arrested on 4 November by the military police in Islamabad during President Pervez Musharraf's declared state of emergency. Bhutto was killed two months later in another attack in Rawalpindi.

Gul acknowledged his affiliation with Ummah Tameer-e-Nau, a group suspected of having passed nuclear weapons information to Al Qaeda and Osama bin Laden. The United States government proposed Gul's name in a list of 4 former ISI officers for inclusion in the list of international terrorists that was sent to United Nations Security Council, but China vetoed the proposal.

After the 2008 Mumbai attacks, Gul was informed by a senior official in Pakistan's foreign ministry that he had been placed on a U.S. watch list of "global terrorists", along with several others. He was shown a U.S. document that detailed several charges against him, including allegations that he had ties to al-Qaeda and the Taliban. Gul rejected these allegations. According to Bill Roggio, Gul was present along with other handlers, at the control room during the Mumbai attacks. The handlers included Gul, Zabiuddin Ansari, Sajid Mir and Syed Salahuddin among others.

On 14 December 2008, President Asif Ali Zardari in an interview with Newsweek described Hamid Gul as a "political ideologue" of terror rather than a physical supporter.

== Family ==
His father was a farmer who served in the British Army. He was survived by his wife, who died in October 2019. He has two sons Umar and Abdullah and a daughter Uzma. His son Abdullah Gul, holds the office of Chairman Tehreek-e-Jawanan Pakistan and Kashmir (TJP). His daughter Uzma is the Chairperson Jammu Kashmir Solidarity Movement & Pak Kashmir Women Alliance.

== Death ==
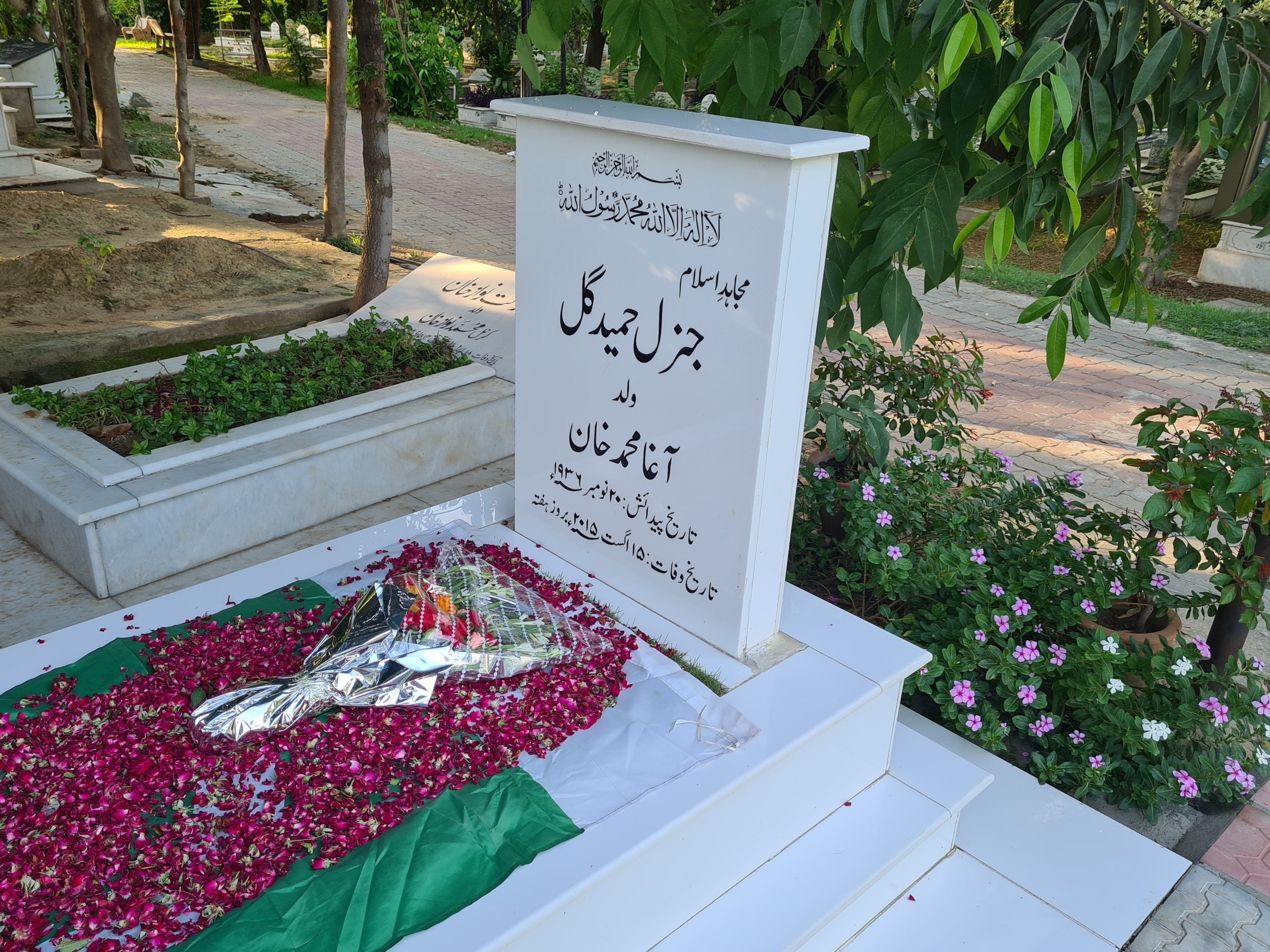
Gul's grave located at the army graveyard in Rawalpindi.

Hamid Gul suffered a haemorrhagic stroke in Murree. According to reports, he had been suffering from high blood pressure and headaches for some time. His death was condoled by Prime Minister Nawaz Sharif, Chief of Army Staff Raheel Sharif, Former General Kayani, Imran Khan and other high officials. Gul is buried at the army cemetery in Westridge, Rawalpindi.

Among his possessions was a piece of the Berlin Wall, gifted to him by the Germans for "delivering the first blow" to the Soviet Union.

== Books ==
- Īfāʼe ʻAhd (ايفائے عهد), Lahore : ʻIlm va ʻIrfān Publishers, 2012, 192 p. An account of various political changes and security challenges in Pakistan. Arranged by Mubīn G̲h̲aznavī.
- Ek Janral Se Inṭarviyū (ايک جنرل سے انٹرويو), Lahore : ʻIlm va ʻIrfān Publishers, 2013, 200 p. Collection of interviews arranged by Mubīn G̲h̲aznavī.

== Awards and decorations ==

Hilal-i-Imtiaz (Military) (Crescent of Excellence)		Sitara-i-Imtiaz (Military) (Star of Excellence)	
Sitara-e-Basalat (Star of Valour)	Sitara-e-Harb 1965 War (War Star 1965)	Sitara-e-Harb 1971 War (War Star 1971)	Tamgha-e-Jang 1965 War (War Medal 1965)
Tamgha-e-Jang 1971 War (War Medal 1971)	10 Years Service Medal	20 Years Service Medal	30 Years Service Medal
Tamgha-e-Sad Saala Jashan-e-Wiladat-e-Quaid-e-Azam (100th Birth Anniversary of Muhammad Ali Jinnah) 1976	Hijri Tamgha (Hijri Medal) 1979	Tamgha-e-Jamhuriat (Democracy Medal) 1988	Qarardad-e-Pakistan Tamgha (Resolution Day Golden Jubilee Medal) 1990

== Bibliography ==
- Zahid Hussain. Frontline Pakistan: The Struggle with Militant Islam, New York: Columbia University Press, 2007.
- Husain Haqqani. Pakistan: Between Mosque and Military, Washington, D.C.: Carnegie Endowment for International Peace, 2005.

Military offices
Preceded by Akhtar Abdur Rahman	Director General of the Inter-Services Intelligence; 1987–1989	Succeeded by Shamsur Rahman Kallu
