= Asif Nawaz Janjua =

Pakistan army general (1937–1993)

General Asif Nawaz Janjua NI(M), HI(M), SBt, psc
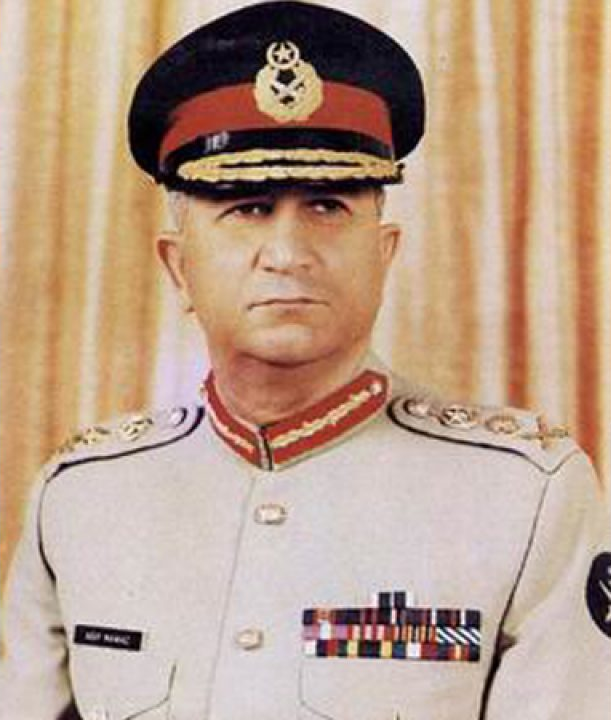
- Born: Asif Nawaz Janjua; 3 January 1937; Chakri Rajgan, Jhelum District, Punjab Province
- Died: 8 January 1993 (aged 56); Rawalpindi Cantonment, Punjab, Pakistan
- Education: Pakistan Military Academy, National Defence University; (MSc in War studies)
- Military career
- Branch: Pakistan Army
- Service years: 1955–1993
- Rank: General
- Nickname: Soldier's Soldier
- Unit: 5th Punjab Regiment
- Commands: Chief of General Staff (Pakistan); V Corps (Pakistan); Commandant PMA Kakul; 7th Infantry Division (Pakistan); Chief of Staff II Corps (Pakistan)
- Conflicts: Indo-Pakistani War of 1965; Indo-Pakistani War of 1971; Battle of Chamb; Political violence in Karachi; Operation Blue Fox; Somali Civil War; UNOSOM I
- Awards: Nishan-e-Imtiaz (Military); Hilal-i-Imtiaz (Military); Sitara-e-Basalat with BAR; Sword of Honour

General Asif Nawaz Janjua (Note: Urdu: آصف نواز جنجوعہ) (3 January 1937 – 8 January 1993) was an officer in the Pakistan Army, serving as its fourth Chief of Army Staff from 16 August 1991 until his death in 1993. His tenure is regarded as contributing to civilian control over the Pakistan Armed Forces. Janjua was one of only four high-ranking officers to have died in active service, alongside Admiral Hasan Hafeez Ahmed (1975), General Zia-ul-Haq (1988), and Air Chief Marshal Mushaf Ali Mir (2002).

His unexpected death was initially surrounded by uncertainty, with some speculating foul play after high levels of arsenic were detected in his hair. His family requested for further investigation, including the exhumation of his body and an autopsy conducted with the assistance of international experts from France, Britain, and the United States. The cause of death was supposedly a heart attack. In April 1993, Janjua's widow Nuzhat, publicly alleged that her husband had been poisoned. She claimed that the assassins were Director General Intelligence Bureau Brigadier Imtiaz Ahmed, Shahbaz Sharif, and Chaudhary Nisar Ali Khan.

Born in the Jhelum District of Punjab Province, Janjua came from a Punjabi Janjua Rajput family. He was educated at St Mary's Cambridge School and later received military training at the Pakistan Military Academy and the Royal Military Academy Sandhurst. Throughout his career, he was recognised for his discipline and leadership.

During his military career, Janjua participated in the Indo-Pakistani War of 1965 and the Indo-Pakistani War of 1971, where he was involved in key battles such as the Battle of Chamb. He progressed through the ranks, holding various significant positions, including Chief of General Staff and Corps Commander of V Corps. He played a role in overseeing military operations, particularly in Karachi and Sindh, during a period of rising instability in the country.

== Biography ==
=== Early life, and between the Indo-Pakistani wars (1965–71) ===
Asif Nawaz Janjua was born in a small village, called Chakri Rajgan, which is located in the Jhelum District in Punjab in Pakistan into a Punjabi Janjua Rajput clan, on 31 January 1937. He was a military brat and his father, Raja Abdul Ghafoor Khan, had served as an officer in the British Indian Army, retiring at the rank of Major.

He was educated at the St Mary's Cambridge School on Murree Road in Rawalpindi. Two Irish teachers there who taught him the value of life and humanity, Father Francis and May Flanagan, had a significant influence on his upbringing and future career. After his matriculation, he went to join the Pakistan Military Academy in 1954, and was one of very few cadets to be selected to attend the Royal Military Academy at Sandhurst in the United Kingdom. After completing his initial military training, he passed out from the academy in 1957 as one of the foreign cadets.

Upon returning to Pakistan, 2nd-Lt. Janjua joined the 5th Sherdils Battalion of the Punjab Regiment on 31 March 1957.

In 1965, Captain Nawaz saw action in the second war with India in 1965 on the northern front. In 1971, Major Janjua fought in the third war with India in 1971 after taking over the command of his 5th Battalion and saw combat in the Chamb sector against the Indian Army.

After the third war with India in 1971, Major Janjua continued his military service and graduated from the Command and Staff College in Quetta, where he excelled in his studies. In 1976–77, Col. Janjua attended the National Defence University where he attained his MSc in War Studies.

=== War and command appointments in the military ===
In 1977, Brigadier Janjua was appointed Chief of Staff of the II Corps stationed in Multan under the command of its field commander, Lt-Gen. M. Shariff. In 1982, he was promoted as two-star rank army general, and escaped from martial law appointments by President Zia-ul-Haq. From 1982 to 1985, Major-General Janjua was posted in Peshawar and served as the GOC of the 7th Infantry Division, posted with the XI Corps.

In 1985, Maj-Gen. Janjua was appointed Commandant of the Pakistan Military Academy in Kakul which he served until 1988. In 1988, he was among the last army generals who were approved for the three-star rank promotion by Prime Minister Mohammad Junejo, and was appointed Corps Commander of the Sindh-based V Corps by then-Chief of Army Staff Gen. Mirza Aslam Beg.

When General Nawaz took command of his Corps in Karachi it had begun to be embroiled in operations against MQM militants in the city. He would soon come to oversee law and order operations by his Corps in the disturbed city of Karachi. As V Corps was also responsible for security in all of Sindh, it had been embroiled in anti-dacoity and law and order operations in Sindh since the early 1980s. The province had destabilised in the wake of the anti-Zia-ul-Haq Movement for the Restoration of Democracy.

In April 1991, Lt-Gen. Janjua was moved to Rawalpindi when he was appointed at the Army GHQ as the Chief of General Staff (CGS), the second-in-command of the army, under the army chief Gen. Mirza Aslam Beg.

== Chief of Army Staff ==
In 1991, Prime Minister Nawaz Sharif approved the timely retirement of Gen. Mirza Aslam Beg, and there were four senior army generals who were in the race for promotion to four-star appointment in the Pakistani military, included with seniority:

- Lt-Gen. Asif Nawaz, the Chief of General Staff at the Army GHQ based in Rawalpindi.
- Lt-Gen. Shamim Alam Khan, the field commander of the XXXI Corps, stationed in Bahawalpur, Punjab.
- Lt-Gen. Zulfiqar Akhtar Naz, the field commander of the I Corps, stationed in Mangla, Punjab.
- Lt-Gen. Hamid Gul, the field commander of the II Corps, Multan, Punjab.

The senior most military officer in the military, Lt-Gen. Janjua's recommendation came from the former Chairman joint chiefs Gen. Rahimuddin Khan when the second most senior military officer, Lt-Gen. Shamim Alam was eventually elevated as the Chairman Joint Chiefs of Staff Committee. Lt Gen. Janjua was confirmed to this four-star promotion by President Ghulam Ishaq Khan on 11 June 1991.

His command over the army came when the military embargo had been placed by the United States due to the suspicion about his country's clandestine atomic bomb program. Gen. Janjua immediately made a press release through the ISPR where he committed to preventing military interference in national politics when he noted that the "army's image had been tarnished and its officers corrupted in Pakistan's 25 years of martial law." Gen. Janjua, who had pro-western views, worked together with Chairman joint chiefs Gen. Shamim and his JS HQ to improve bilateral relations between Pakistan and the United States when he agreed to deploy the combat brigades of the Pakistan Army in Somalia as part of the UN Mission to end the civil war in the country.

His political views reflected political liberalism and he tried to improve the military-to-military relations with the Indian Army when he successfully took Pakistan out of what he saw as the dead-end policy of Islamism by former conservative President Zia. During Nawaz's tenure, the army took on the surprising role of becoming a protector of a free press and the liberal values of criticism.

As an army chief, Gen. Janjua played a crucial role in providing military aid to the civilian Government of Pakistan when he deployed the Pakistan Army Rangers to aid the Sindh Police against the dacoits and gangs in Karachi and rural Sindh.

== Death ==
Janjua died on 8 January 1993, while he was jogging near his home in Rawalpindi. The death was ruled a heart attack and no autopsy was conducted before the burial, in line with Muslim customs.

In April 1993, Janjua's widow Nuzhat, claimed that her husband had been poisoned by Brigadier Imtiaz Ahmed, head of the Intelligence Bureau, Shahbaz Sharif, and Chaudhary Nisar Ali Khan.

His family commissioned a private forensic test on hair from his hairbrush, which was conducted in the United States. The tests revealed 67 micrograms of arsenic in his hair, significantly higher than the normal level of 4 micrograms. According to the lab report, "The arsenic... falls within the range considered toxic," indicating elevated levels of arsenic in the hair. The forensic toxicologist stated that the arsenic level by itself is not enough to determine the cause of death but raises a flag that further analysis is warranted. Initially, the government deployed police at his grave to prevent his body from being exhumed. There were rumours that Janjua's stomach was removed prior to his burial. It was later reported that Janjua's relatives had hired private security guards to protect his grave, fearing his body would be tampered with.

As a result, his body was exhumed, and an autopsy was conducted by French, British, and American doctors. The cause of death was determined to be a heart attack. A Supreme Court investigation also ruled that Janjua died of natural causes, without performing an autopsy.

Janjua was among just four senior officers to have died while in active service, alongside Admiral Hasan Hafeez Ahmed (1975), General Zia-ul-Haq (1988), and Air Chief Marshal Mushaf Ali Mir (2002).

== Legacy ==
Former Prime Minister Benazir Bhutto, then described Asif Nawaz as "a true professional soldier," and further stated that "he did what he said he would do – he kept the army out of politics." Unlike many of his predecessors, Asif Nawaz was incorruptible and often talked of how he would relax when he retired, unlike other generals who plunged into politics.

== Awards and decorations ==

Nishan-e-Imtiaz (Military) (Order of Excellence)		Hilal-i-Imtiaz (Military) (Crescent of Excellence)	
Sitara-e-Basalat (Star of Valour) with BAR	Sitara-e-Harb 1971 War (War Star 1971)	Tamgha-e-Jang 1965 War (War Medal 1965)	Tamgha-e-Jang 1971 War (War Medal 1971)
10 Years Service Medal	20 Years Service Medal	30 Years Service Medal	Tamgha-e-Sad Saala Jashan-e-Wiladat-e-Quaid-e-Azam (100th Birth Anniversary of Muhammad Ali Jinnah) 1976
Tamgha-e-Qayam-e-Jamhuria (Republic Commemoration Medal) 1956	Hijri Tamgha (Hijri Medal) 1979	Tamgha-e-Jamhuriat (Democracy Medal) 1988	Qarardad-e-Pakistan Tamgha (Resolution Day Golden Jubilee Medal) 1990

== Notes ==
Military offices
Preceded by Shamim Alam Khan	Chief of General Staff; 1991	Succeeded by Farrakh Khan
Preceded by Mirza Aslam Beg	Chief of Army Staff; 1991–1993	Succeeded by Abdul Waheed Kakar
