= Major Amir =

Pakistani Army officer

Major (R) Mohammad Aamir Khan
- Born: Panjpir, Swabi District, Pakistan
- Occupations: Analyst, Afghan affairs specialist, former officer of ISI
- Known for: Operation Midnight Jackal
- Father: Tahir Panjpiri

Mohammad Aamir Khan better known as Major Amir, is a Pakistani analyst, Afghan affairs specialist and former officer of a secret agency ISI. He is known for the Operation Midnight Jackal.

== Early life ==
Amir was born to Muhammad Tahir Panjpiri in a religious family of Panjpir a town in Swabi District.

== Operation Midnight Jackal ==
Both Brig. Ahmed and Major Amir were discharged from their military commissions in 1989. The inquiry remains classified since it is still unclear who the real culprit behind the plot was, or was it under the instructions of the DG ISI Shamsur Rahman Kallu.
