= Operation Rising Sun =

1970s Cold War military intelligence program

Operation Sun Rising was a Cold War military intelligence program run by the ISI of Pakistan during the late 1970s. In the 1970s, the program was launched when the ISI believed the President Jimmy Carter's administration was planning of sabotaging and infiltrating the highly clandestine atomic bomb projects. The program's purpose was to collect intelligence cycle on potential contingency plans of Carter administration sabotaging of certain bomb-related installations and facilities. The program was initiated in 1979 by Imtiaz Ahmed, then chief of Intelligence Bureau.

The Sun Rising was downscaled with the arrest and conviction of an agent working for CIA and the declaration of a few undercover CIA agents and US diplomats as personae non gratae and their return. The program remained highly secretive for several years after its operational activities activated since 1979. The program's existence was discovered by espionage investigative journalist, Ansar Abbasi of the News International in 2009. Since its discovery, the exact notion and nature of the program has been criticized by prominent news media of Pakistan.
