= Zahid Hussain (journalist) =

Pakistani journalist, writer and analyst

- Born: 1949 (age 76–77); Hyderabad, Sindh, Pakistan
- Education: University of Karachi
- Occupations: Journalist, writer Television commentator and analyst
- Website: zahidhussain.com.pk

Zahid Hussain (Urdu: زاہد حسین) is a Pakistani journalist, writer and television analyst.

Hussain is a correspondent covering Pakistan and Afghanistan for The Times of London and The Wall Street Journal. His work has included assignments for Newsweek, the Associated Press, The Economist and several other international publications.

Hussain also writes regularly for Pakistani daily newspaper Dawn and the magazine Newsline.

== Early life and education ==
Zahid Hussain was born in Hyderabad, Sindh in 1949 to a family that migrated to Pakistan in 1948. He received his Bachelors in Chemistry from the University of Karachi.

== Books and other works ==
=== Frontline Pakistan: The Struggle with Militant Islam (2007) ===
In 2007, Hussain published Frontline Pakistan: The Struggle with Militant Islam. One major Pakistani English-language newspaper says in its review that the book "has been widely appreciated by the academic, political and diplomatic circles of Britons because it is for the first time that a Pakistani has written a book on the issues of terrorism, jihad, role of the Pakistani military in politics and failure of the establishment in tackling the issue of radical Islam."

One of Hussain's critics at the 2007 book launching ceremony defended the role of religious parties in Pakistan, including the role of Muttahida Majlis-e-Amal, and said that religio-political parties are part of a democratic process and that people need to clearly know the difference between terrorist groups and the legitimate religio-political parties.

One official from the High Commission of Pakistan, London attending the same book ceremony criticised the contents of the above book and termed it a one-sided and biased view against Pakistan and its institutions. He wondered why Hussain had not covered the role of the Western countries in fuelling terrorism.

Hussain claimed that a proxy war between the Shia-majority Iran and the Sunni-majority Saudi Arabia was being fought on the Pakistani streets for some years and hundreds of people had already lost their lives in this bloody war. He said that this kind of sectarian violence was equally threatening to the Pakistani State and its institutions.

=== The Scorpion's Tail: The Relentless Rise of Islamic Militants in Pakistan (2010) ===
In 2010, Hussain published The Scorpion's Tail: The Relentless Rise of Islamic Militants in Pakistan. In its review, The Express Tribune says that the book is an expanded timeline of major terrorist attacks and military operations in Pakistan in the past few years before 2010. It covers the two military operations in 2009 by the Pakistani military, Operation Black Thunderstorm and Operation Rah-e-Rast to take back control of Swat District and its surrounding areas from Tehrik-e-Taliban Pakistan and other terrorist organisations.

Lal Masjid Conflict and Benazir Bhutto's assassination in 2007 are also covered in this book.

=== Pakistan's Tribal Areas and Regional Security ===
Hussain worked on this project for the Woodrow Wilson International Center for Scholars from 2011 to 2012.

=== No-Win War: The Paradox of US-Pakistan Relations in Afghanistans Shadow ===
Published by the OUP in 2021, the book takes a look at Pakistan-US relations post 9/11 in the context of the War in Afghanistan.
