= Chakri Rajgan =

Village in Punjab Province, Pakistan

- Village
- Union Council: Nakka Khurd
- Region: Punjab Province
- District: Jhelum
- Tehsil: Jhelum
- Country: Pakistan
- Tribes: Janjua Rajput
- Founder: Raja Dhuman Khan
- Time zone: UTC+5 (PST)
- Website: http://www.chakri-rajgan.org

Chakri Rajgan is a village in union council 2 (UC-2, Nakka Khurd) of Jhelum District in the Punjab Province of Pakistan. It is part of Jhelum Tehsil.
