= Okara Cantonment =

Coordinates: 30.74058°N 73.35667°E

Okara Cantonment is a cantonment adjacent to the city of Okara in the Punjab province, of Pakistan. It is roughly equidistant from Lahore and Multan and approximately 25 km from Sahiwal.

== Location ==
Okara Cantonment is 10 km away from Okara city, and is located on the Grand Trunk Road. Okara Cantonment has three main entrance gates. The small town of Gamber is situated near the first gate, which is also referred to as the Al-Jehad check post. The total area of Okara Cantonment is about 6,070 hectares (15,010 acres) .

== History ==
Okara Cantt was established during 1967 in the district of Okara which is a district of Punjab situated on south-west to the city of Lahore. On 29 October 2008 the Chief of Army Staff (COAS), General Ashfaq Parvez Kayani visited Okara Garrison.
