= Mirza Aslam Beg =

3rd Chief of the Army Staff of the Pakistan Army (1988–1991)

Mirza Aslam Beg NI(M) HI(M) Sbt LoM
- مرزا اسلم بیگ
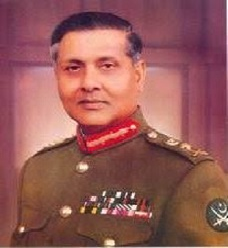
- General Beg inspecting a Pakistan Army unit (1991)

3rd Chief of the Army Staff
- In office 17 August 1988 – 16 August 1991
- President: Ghulam Ishaq Khan
- Prime Minister: Benazir Bhutto (1988–1990); Nawaz Sharif (1990–1991)
- Preceded by: Muhammad Zia-ul-Haq
- Succeeded by: Asif Nawaz

Vice Chief of the Army Staff
- In office 29 March 1987 – 17 August 1988
- President: Muhammad Zia-ul-Haq
- Prime Minister: Muhammad Khan Junejo
- Preceded by: Khalid Mahmud Arif

Personal details
- Born: 2 August 1931 (age 95) Azamgarh district, United Provinces of British India
- Education: Shibli National College, Azamgarh (B.A.); Pakistan Military Academy; National Defence University, Islamabad (MSc)
- Awards: Nishan-e-Imtiaz (Military); Hilal-i-Imtiaz (Military); Sitara-e-Basalat; Legion of Merit (United States); Tamgha-e-Diffa; Tamgha-e-Jang 1965; Tamgha-e-Jang 1971

Military service
- Allegiance: Pakistan (1947–1991)
- Branch/service: Pakistan Army
- Years of service: 1949–1991
- Rank: General
- Unit: Baloch Regiment
- Commands: Adjutant General at Army GHQ; Chief of General Staff (CGS); XI Corps (Pakistan); Chief Instructor (CI) at NDU; 14th Infantry Division, Okara
- Battles/wars: Indo-Pakistani War of 1965; Bangladesh Liberation War; Indo-Pakistani War of 1971; Siachen War; Gulf War; Operation Desert Storm; First Afghan Civil War; Battle of Jalalabad

Mirza Aslam Beg (Note: Urdu: مرزا اسلم بیگ) (born 2 August 1931), often referred to as M. A. Beg, is a retired Pakistani four-star rank general who served as the third Chief of the Army Staff of the Pakistan Army from August 1988 until his retirement in August 1991. His ascension to the army chief post followed the death of his predecessor, President General Zia-ul-Haq, in a mysterious aircraft crash on August 1988.

== Early life in India and education ==
Mirza Aslam Beg was born in the small village, Muslimpatti, in Azamgarh district, Uttar Pradesh in British India, to the Urdu speaking Muhajir family of eleven children (eight sons, three daughters) that was well known for its Mughal nobility, on 15 February 1928.

His father, Mirza Murtaza Beg, was an advocate and practicing lawyer who had held a well known prestige and respected name in the law circles of the Allahabad High Court. The Baig's family had traced a long ancestral roots of the Mughal royal family who once were emperors of India from the early 15th century to the early 18th century.

He was educated at the Azamgarh where he graduated from a local high school and enrolled at the Shibli National College, Azamgarh for his undergraduate studies, in 1945. Subsequently, he earned Bachelor of Arts (BA) degree in Liberal Arts from Shibli National College in 1949.

During his college years, Mirza played collegiate field hockey and was vital member of his hockey team which consisted of mainly Muslims. According to his memories, Beg sought revenge on a Hindu politician belonging to Congress Party after the politician had beaten up a member of his hockey team. Egged on by a mob of students, Beg used his hockey stick to beat up the politician at a public meeting. This incident came after his graduation from college in 1949, and Beg's family decided to move to Pakistan in 1949 after the Indian partition in 1947.

== Military career ==
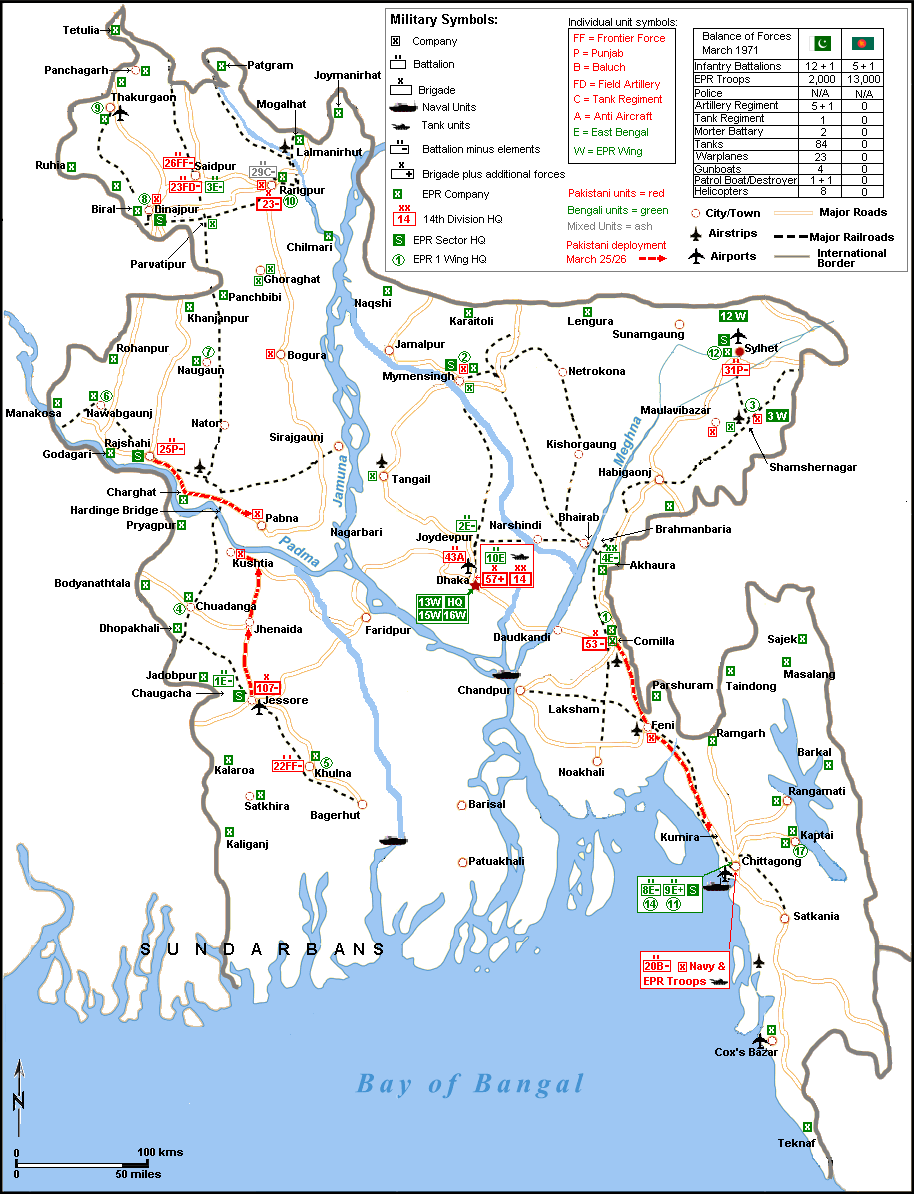
MI's Map of East Pakistan in 1971. Beg, then-Lt-Col., had been very critical of Eastern Command's interference in the Govt. of East Pakistan.

The Beg family set sailed for Karachi from Bombay via Royal Pakistan Navy ship in 1949. His elder brother was already a commissioned officer in the Pakistan Army and encouraged young Beg to follow his path to seek a career in the army. Beg recalled his memoirs to his Indian interviewer and called Pakistan as "my dream country". In 1950, Beg was accepted at the Pakistan Military Academy (PMA) in Kakul, graduating from a class of 6th PMA Long Course in 1952.

In 1952, he gained a commission as 2Lt. in the 6 Baloch Regiment of the Pakistan Army and initially assisted the command of an infantry platoon. From 1952 to 1958, he progressed well toward the military ranks, having been promoted to army lieutenant in 1956; and army captain in 1958. He received recommendations from his field commanding officer for the selection by the special branch to join the special forces, and departed to the United States in 1958 to complete the special forces training with the U.S. Army Special Forces in Fort Bragg, North Carolina.

In 1960, Major Beg returned to Pakistan and joined the elite Army Special Service Group (SSG), initially commanding a company that specialized in military infiltration. Major Beg was deployed in Western Pakistan, in areas adjacent to Afghanistan, where his first combat experience took place when he led his company in removing the Nawab of Dir in Chitral in North-West Frontier Province. In 1965, Major Beg served well in the second war with India and led the Special Forces team against the Indian Army.

=== Academia and professorship ===
In 1967, Major Beg was promoted as Lieutenant-Colonel, eventually sent to attend the National Defence University (NDU) to continue his higher education, alongside then-Lieutenant-Colonel Zahid Ali Akbar, an engineering officer from the Corps of Engineers.

After attending the Armed Forces War College and graduated with MSc in Strategic studies in 1971, Lt.Col. Beg was stationed in East-Pakistan to serve as a military adviser to the Eastern Command led by its GOC-in-C, Lieutenant-General A.A.K. Niazi. Upon arriving and observing the military deployments and actions, Lt.Col. Beg became very critical of Gen. Niazi's strategy and eventually became involved in acrimonious argument with his Gen. Niazi's staff in Dacca, having been very critical of armed forces interference in the political events in East. His open mindedness and arguments with his senior officer eventually led his transfer back to Pakistan and was threatened with facing the court martial.

In 1971, he commanded an infantry regiment in third war with India but was sent back to attend the National Defence University where he became even more involved with his studies. In 1971–72, he earned his MSc in War Studies, defending and publishing his thesis, entitled: "A journey of pain and fear" which provide critical analysis of state sponsored terrorism and its effects on geo-military positions of the countries. Lt. Col. Beg left the special forces, and accepted the professorship on war studies at the NDU in 1975. Brig. Beg tenured as the professor on the war studies and remained Chief Instructor of Armed Forces War College at the then National Defence University until January 1978.

About the 1971 war, Beg maintained that the Pakistan Armed Forces "learned a valuable strategic lesson", and that quoted that the government also learned that "there is no point in going to war unless you are absolutely certain you have the capability to win".

From 1994 to 1999, Beg continued his teaching at NDU and published his two books on national security, nuclear weapons development, defence diplomacy and international relations.

=== War and Command appointments ===
In 1978, Brig. Beg left the professorship at the university and was promoted into the two-star command appointment in the army. Major-General Beg was appointed the GOC of the 14th Army Division, stationed at the Okara Military District of Punjab Province in Pakistan.

In March 1979, chief of army staff, General Zia-ul-Haq, directed the II Strike Corps' "to ascertain the likely reaction of the Pakistan Armed Forces officers if Bhutto was hanged", in accordance to the Supreme Court's verdict. During this meeting, Major-General Beg objected to the hanging of Bhutto and maintained to his senior commanders that: "The hanging of Bhutto would be an unwise act, as it could cause very serious "political aberrations" that will be difficult to correct. In 1979, Major-General Beg was moved at Army GHQ, taking over the staff appointment as an Adjutant-General, which he served until 1980. He was later elevated as the Chief of General Staff (CGS), remained in charge of operational planning of the counter-offensive to the Indian invasion of Siachen marking the beginnings of the ongoing Siachen conflict in 1984.

In 1985, Major-General Beg was elevated to three-star promotion and was appointed Corp's Commander of the XI Corps, that stationed in Peshawar, which had role in the indirect war with the Soviet Army in Afghanistan, since 1980.

According to the military authors and Pakistani historians' accounts, Lieutenant-General Beg was extremely distrusted by President Zia-ul-Haq, mainly due to his open-mindedness and his pro-democracy views, at one point, advising President Zia to "rendezvous with the nation's history and democratize the country."

In 1987, Lieutenant-General Beg was in the race for the promotion of four-star appointment, along with Lieutenant-General Zahid Ali Akbar, but was overlooked by President Zia who wanted Lt.Gen. Akbar for the four-star appointment as chief of army staff. Prime Minister M.K. Junejo eventually used his prerogative to appoint Lieutenant-General Mirza Aslam Beg as vice-army chief on merit, despite President Zia wanting Lieutenant-General Zahid Ali Akbar who was sent to DESTO.

=== Chief of Army Staff ===
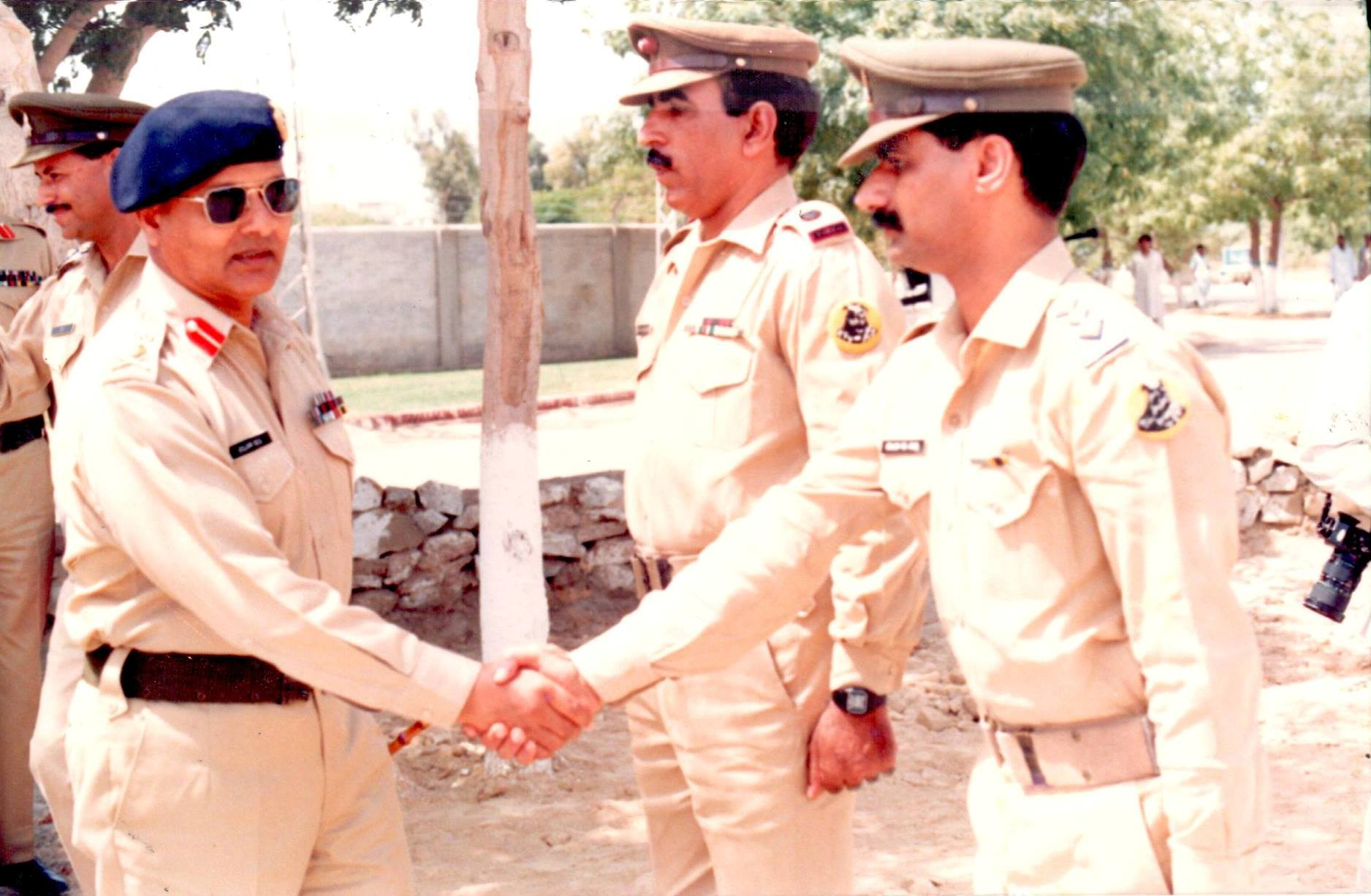
Gen. Mirza Aslam Beg, COAS, visiting Pakistan Army formation in 1991.

In March 1987, Prime Minister Mohammad Junejo announced in the news media of appointing Lieutenant-General Beg as a Vice Chief of Army Staff, promoting him as the four-star rank general in the army.

Though, General Beg did not supersede anyone and was the most senior, the promotion was notable due to the opposition shown by President Zia-ul-Haq who wanted Lieutenant-General Zahid Ali Akbar, an engineer, as vice army chief.

Despite his four-star command assignment, General Beg had to report his duties and decisions to President Zia who had been army chief since 1976. Eventually, General Beg succeeded President Zia as the new army chief and the command of the army when the latter died in an accidental plane crash on 17 August 1988. American military authors regarded Beg as "mild but bookish general" keen to drive the country towards the tracks of democracy.

The United States military regarded Beg as an "Unpredictable General" could not be counted on to continue close military cooperation with the United States as Zia did in the 1980s. The Pentagon had commented on Beg as "a professional soldier" with no political ambitions, but independent-minded and unpredictable. In 1988, one Pentagon military official added that "Beg is hard to figure out and difficult to read his mindset unlike other Pakistan army generals, he hasn't been particularly friendly with the US."

Against the popular perception to take over, Beg endorsed Ghulam Ishaq Khan as president and ultimately called for new general elections which resulted in a peaceful democratic transfer of government to the Pakistan Peoples Party (PPP) with Benazir Bhutto as the Prime minister. Beg did not consult any of his corps commanders or principal staff officers (PSOs) and called on the Chief of Naval Staff, Admiral Iftikhar Sirohey, and Chief of Air Staff Air Chief Marshal Hakimullah, to discuss the matter briefly and within three hours of General Zia-ul-Haq's death, restored the Constitution and handed over power to Ghulam Ishaq Khan. It was an unprecedented decision in favour of democracy and the rule of law.

Mirza Aslam Beg was endorsed by Prime Minister Benazir Bhutto who confirmed his four-star appointment as chief of army staff until 1991, when he was replaced by General Asif Nawaz. Unlike General Zia, Beg initiated a massive re-evaluation and education training program for the inter-services officers. In 1988, Beg's personal initiatives led to sending of hundreds of inter-services officers to Western universities for advanced degrees. By 1991, several of the inter-services officers had gained post-graduate degree in operational and technical training.

In 1988, Prime Minister Benazir Bhutto conferred Beg with a specially designated civil award for Mirza Aslam Beg for restoring democracy in Pakistan, Tamgha-e-Jamhuriat (lit. Medal of Democracy). In fact, Beg is the only one in Pakistan, and yet the only four-star army general to have been decorated with such an honour. Although Prime Minister Benazir Bhutto was criticized for decorating a four-star general with a civilian award, she used to justify her decision, saying that Beg deserved this honour because he refrained from indulging in yet another military adventure like Zia and instead helped Pakistan to a peaceful transition of power through general elections.

On 16 August 1991, General Beg retired from his military serving, completing 41 years of service, and handing over command to General Asif Nawaz. As an army chief, General Beg is credited by an Australian Army expert for encouraging "wider thinking about tactics" within the Pakistan Army, particularly for establishing a much improved logistics chain and "contributed immensely to the army's warfighting capabilities".

=== Soviet withdrawal and Afghan war ===
As chief of army staff, Beg determinately retained the military's control over the policies regarding the national security of Pakistan, and dictated Prime Minister Benazir Bhutto's role in formulating the national security policies. Beg testified that the "real causes behind the 'Pressler amendment' was significant as long as Pakistan was considered an important entity of weakening Soviet Union's influence in South Asia". Various writers greatly questioned his idea of "strategic depth", which aim to transfer of Pakistan's military science command in dense Afghanistan, against the war with India.

Beg endorsed the role of his deputy, Lieutenant-General Hamid Gul in Afghanistan war who masterminded the Jalalabad operation which failed brutally; Gul was deposed by Prime Minister Bhutto soon after this action. Beg's role remained vital during and after the Soviet Union's troop withdrawal from Afghanistan and showed no intention to coordinate joint efforts with the U.S. to end the war in the country. In late 1989, Pakistan and U.S. propagated the message of departing of communist government in order to bring the clerical government instead. Authors and media reporters maintained that Beg controversially proposed an intelligence contingency plan between the agencies of Afghanistan, Pakistan and Iran that would grow into the "core of the Muslim world". Such idea was met with hostility in the government and Foreign Minister Yacob Khan and Prime Minister Benazir Bhutto were the ones who objected and opposed to this idea.

=== Gulf War in Iraq ===
Contingency map of Iraq War in 1990. Gen. Mirza was instrument in deploying and leading the Pakistan Army against Iraq as part of the U.N. Coalition.

In 1989, Beg drafted a contingency plan and organized a massive military exercise, Exercise Zarb-e-Momin, to prove the military solidarity contentions. One of the notable events as a stint as a chief of army staff during the end of Cold War took place in 1990, when Iraq invaded Kuwait amidst political tensions between two Arab countries. Beg fully endorsed the United States-led military campaign against Iraq. In a briefing given to Prime Minister Benazir Bhutto and President Ghulam Ishaq Khan, Beg maintained the assessment that once the ground battle with the Iraqi Army was joined, the Iraqi Army would comprehensively defeat and repel the American Army.

Ironically, Beg accused the Western countries for encouraging Iraq to invade Kuwait, though he kept his armed forces fighting against Iraq in support to Saudi Arabia. In 1990, he held state dinner for United States Central Command (SCENTCOM) commander General Norman Schwarzkopf where, together with Chairman Joint Chiefs Admiral Iftikhar Sirohey, brief the USCENTCOM on Pakistan Armed Forces battle preparations and military operational capabilities of Pakistan armed forces in Saudi contingent.

The Iraq war with Kuwait was a polarizing political issue in Pakistan and Beg carefully commanded and deployed the Pakistan Armed Forces' contingent forces during Operation Desert Storm in 1991. Beg calculated that the popular opinion would be in favor of Iraq, as the anti-American sentiment in the Middle East began to grow at that time.

But neither did Beg's strategic prediction come true nor did he get an extension. Soon after the end of Gulf war, Beg proceeded towards his retirement on 18 August 1991.

== Post-military career ==
After failing to persuade the government of his extension, Beg's later political ambitions forced then-president Ghulam Ishaq Khan to nominate General Asif Nawaz as the designated chief of army staff three months prior to his retirement. After Beg's retirement he continued the professorship at National Defence University in Islamabad, and remained active in country's political and military affairs.

=== Funding of conservative politicians ===
Soon after retiring from his military service in 1991, Beg earned the public criticism when the Pakistan Peoples Party's politicians went on aired on several news channels of being charged on personally authorizing the intelligence funds to be released to the conservative politicians. A lawsuit was filed by Asghar Khan at the Supreme Court of Pakistan against him, the former Director ISI Asad Durrani, and Younis Habib, the accountant with the Ministry of Defence in 1992, and official court inquiries began when the local Pakistani newspaper, alleging that the conservatives had received as much as ₨. 140 million to win over the "for-sale" leftists politicians.

In 1994, the official government investigations pursued further when Interior minister Naseerullah Babar in Benazir administration disclosed this matter at the Parliament while maintaining that "it was the ISI that had disbursed funds to purchase the loyalty of conservative mass and nationalist public figures to manipulate the general elections held in 1990 and to bring the conservatives in race to compete with left-wing politicians in the country." It was reported that Gen. Beg had the Younis Habib released and deposited around ₨. 140 million in the Survey Section 202 account of Military Intelligence (MI), with ₨. 6 million were channeled to accounts of President Ghulam Ishaq Khan including the bureaucracts: Syed Refaqat Hussain, Roedad Khan, and Ijlal Zaidi. In 2017, the second lawsuit filed against Prime Minister Nawaz Sharif has connected him when Just. Gulzar, in his final verdict, reads:

[Late] Ghulam Ishaq Khan, the then-President of Pakistan, General Aslam Beg and General Asad Durrani acted in violation of the Constitution by facilitating a group of politicians and political parties, etc., to ensure their success against the rival candidates in the general election of 1990, for which they secured funds from Mr. Yunus Habib. Their acts have brought a bad name to Pakistan and professionality of the Armed Forces as well as intelligence agencies in the eyes of the nation, therefore, notwithstanding that they may have retired from service, the [Federal] Government shall take necessary steps under the Constitution and Law against them.

=== Nuclear proliferation controversy ===
Internationally, Beg was widely criticised for his alleged involvement with the nuclear program of Iran. A report in The Friday Times contends that after taking over as Chief of Army Staff, General Aslam Beg began lobbying about "such cooperation with Iran" on nuclear technology as a part of his "strategy of defiance" of the United States. As chief of army staff, Beg had initiated lectureship programs on physics, chemistry, mathematics and engineering for inter-services officers, by the Pakistani scientists serving their professors, to have better understanding on nuclear policy matters and policy development.

Earlier, Beg had calculated that such cooperation with Iran was popular and that, Saudi Arabia and the Persian Gulf Arabs were less popular as American clients in the region. General Beg had encouraged dr. Abdul Qadeer Khan to proliferate technology to Iran and North Korea.

The speed with which he maintained the "new nuclear policy" leads one to speculate whether he simply wanted the "obstacle" of General Zia to disappear from the scene. General Zia did not know or received any payments of such agreement; in fact, Zia did not know if Beg was in act with Iran. Zia was deeply committed to the Arabs, especially to Saudi Arabia, to create a restraint to contain the Iranian influence. According to Ahmad, Prime minister Nawaz Sharif was shocked that Beg had signed a secret nuclear deal with Iran without telling him; therefore, the Prime minister abrogated the cooperation and tightened the security watch on A.Q. Khan. However, in 2004 interview to PBS, Beg clearly denied of his involvement with Iranian program and quoted:

If [Benazir] government wasn't aware, how was I aware? I was army chief from 1988 to 1991. If we were never told what was happening beneath the surface when the Americans knew, when the British agencies knew, when they have claimed they have penetrated the entire system including Pakistan— so are they not guilty?

— Mirza Aslam Beg, 2004, source

In 2005 interview to NBC, Beg defended his and A.Q. Khan's ground and maintained to the NBC that "Nuclear Proliferators can't be stopped." Beg added that the Americans and Europeans have been engaged in nuclear proliferation as part of a concept, called "outsourcing nuclear capability", to friendly countries as a measure of defense against nuclear strike. Beg pointed out that the "nuclear non-proliferation regime, therefore, is dying its natural death at the hands of those who are the exponents of the nuclear non-proliferation regime". Beg also theorized that "nuclear deterrent is what holds the strategic balance between the two or more belligerents".

=== Accusation of role in Zia's death ===
According to an article in the Express Tribune, Beg was in contact with senior scientist, Dr. Abdul Qadeer Khan, about bringing Iran into the fold of "nuclear prowess" much to the annoyance of his superior and senior officer, General Muhammad Zia-ul-Haq. At this point, without a green signal from President Zia-ul-Haq, Beg got acquainted with Dr. A.Q. Khan to secretly proliferate the technology crucial to master the nuclear fuel.

On 1 December 2012, President Zia's son Ijaz-ul-Haq maintained that it was Beg who conspired in the death of his father. Earlier in 1988, the Shafiur Rehman Commission that was to establish the cause of the crash of Muhammad Zia-ul-Haq's plane concluded that because of Army's obstruction in the investigation, the real perpetrators behind the attack cannot be brought forward.

=== Political activism ===
Upon returning to civilian life, General Beg founded and established a policy think-tank institute in Islamabad, known as Foundation for Research on International Environment National Development and Security (Friends). He is the current founding chairman of the Friends think-tank since its foundations.

Beg later founded the nationalist political party, the Awami Qaiyadat Party (lit. National Leadership Party) which continued to be a part of right-wing sphere. Though his party gained no political prominence and failed to compete in national general elections, his party remains registered in the Election Commission with Gun as its election symbol.

=== Musharraf on Beg ===
General Beg was one of many professors under whom Musharraf had studied at National Defence University. Musharraf had high regards for Beg as one of his "significant professors" in his university years, but after 11 September 2001 they became estranged. Beg was labelled as one of many professors at NDU who were called "pseudo-intellectuals" by Musharraf.

== Written works ==
=== Books ===
- Beg, Mirzā Aslam (1999). National security: diplomacy and defence. Rawalpindi: FRIENDS Publication. p. 93. ISBN 969-8199-13-6.
- Beg, Mirza Aslam (1994). Development and security: thoughts and reflections. Rawalpindi, Pakistan: Foundation for Research and National Development and Security, FRIENDS. p. 252. ISBN 969-8199-01-2.

=== Articles ===
- Beg, Mirza Aslam (28 May 1997). "Gen. Mirza Aslam Beg - From UP's Azamgarh, he called democratic polls after Zia's death; yet retains a sense of dissatisfaction". Outlook India.
- Beg, Mirza A. (10 July 2011). "The superpower under siege". The Nation. Archived from the original on 17 February 2013.
- Beg, Mirza A. (21 August 2011). "Pak-US relations: Terms of engagement". The Nation. Archived from the original on 17 February 2013.

== Awards and decorations ==

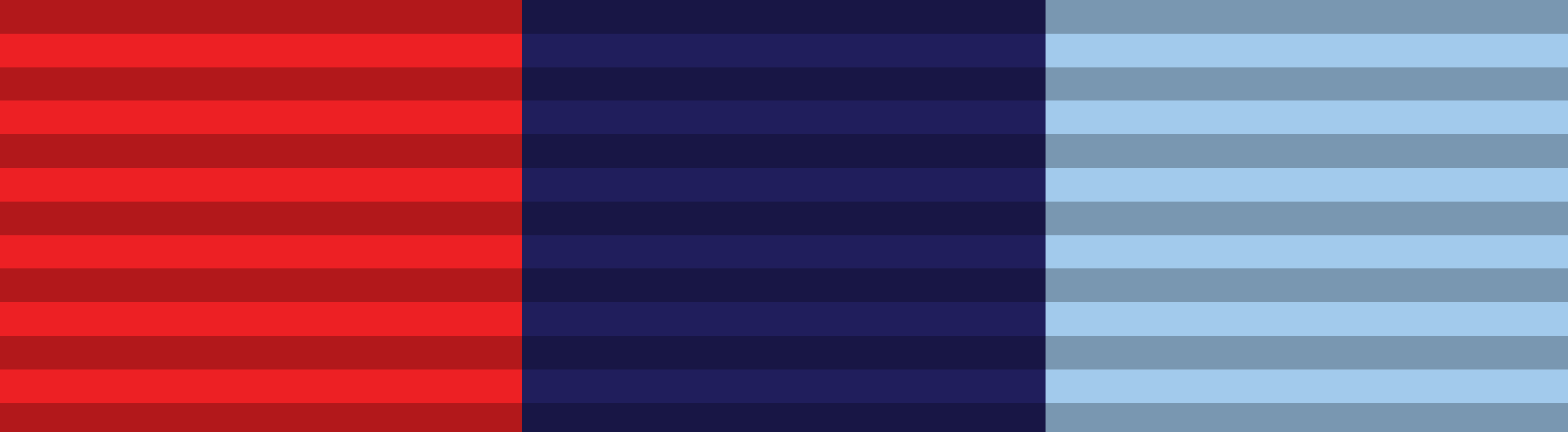

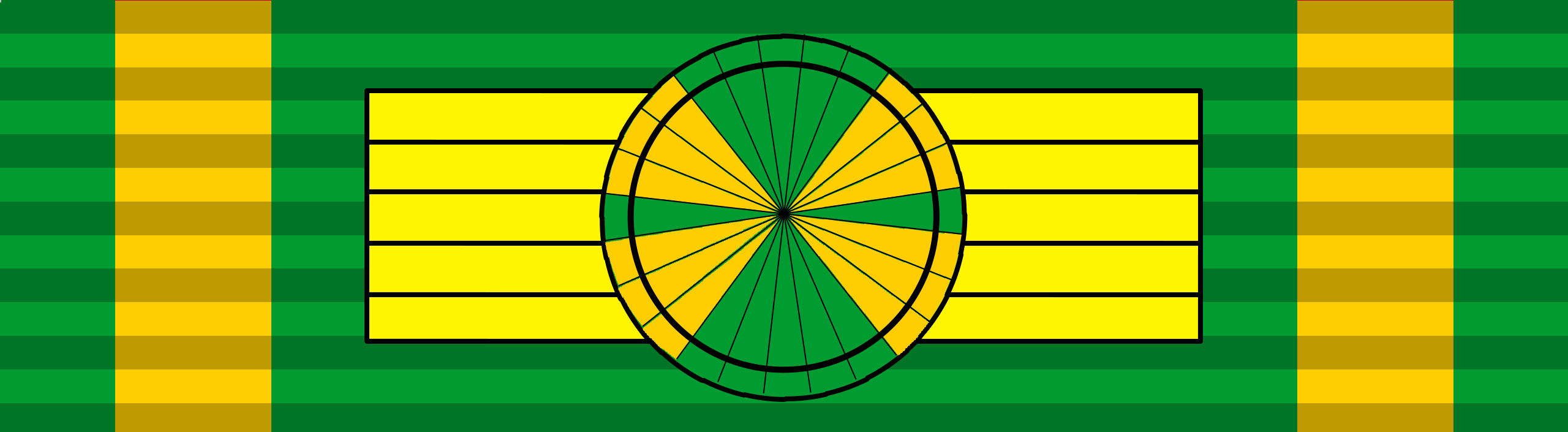

Nishan-e-Imtiaz (Military) (Order of Excellence)	Hilal-i-Imtiaz (Military) (Crescent of Excellence)	Sitara-e-Basalat (Star of Valour)	Tamgha-e-Diffa (Defence Medal)
Sitara-e-Harb 1965 War (War Star 1965)	Sitara-e-Harb 1971 War (War Star 1971)	Tamgha-e-Jang 1965 War (War Medal 1965)	Tamgha-e-Jang 1971 War (War Medal 1971)
10 Years Service Medal	20 Years Service Medal	30 Years Service Medal	40 Years Service Medal
Tamgha-e-Sad Saala Jashan-e-e-Quaid-e-Azam (100th Birth Anniversary of Muhammad Ali Jinnah) 1976	Tamgha-e-Qayam-e-Jamhuria (Republic Commemoration Medal) 1956	Hijri Tamgha (Hijri Medal) 1979	Jamhuriat Tamgha (Democracy Medal) 1988
Qarardad-e-Pakistan Tamgha (Resolution Day Golden Jubilee Medal) 1990	Tong il Order of National Security Merit (South Korea)	The Legion of Merit (Degree of Commander) (United States)	Order of King Abdul Aziz (1st Class) (Saudi Arabia)

=== Foreign decorations ===
Foreign Awards
South Korea	Tong il Order of National Security Merit
USA	The Legion of Merit (Degree of Commander)
Saudi Arabia	Order of King Abdul Aziz - Class I

== Bibliography ==
- Zahid Hussain. Frontline Pakistan: The Struggle with Militant Islam, New York: Columbia University Press, 2007.
- Hussain, Ashfaq (2021). Iqtidar Ki Majbooriyan (اقتدار کی مجبوریاں) [The compulsions of power].

Military offices
Preceded by Sirdar Farooq Shaukat Khan Lodi	Chief of General Staff; 1980–1985	Succeeded by Muhammad Safdar
Preceded by Khalid Mahmud Arif	Vice Chief of Army Staff; 1987–1988	Succeeded by post abolished
Preceded by Muhammad Zia-ul-Haq	Chief of Army Staff; 1988–1991	Succeeded by Asif Nawaz
