= Shamsur Rahman Kallue =

Pakistani general (1932–1995)

Shamsur Rahman Kallue HI(M) TBt
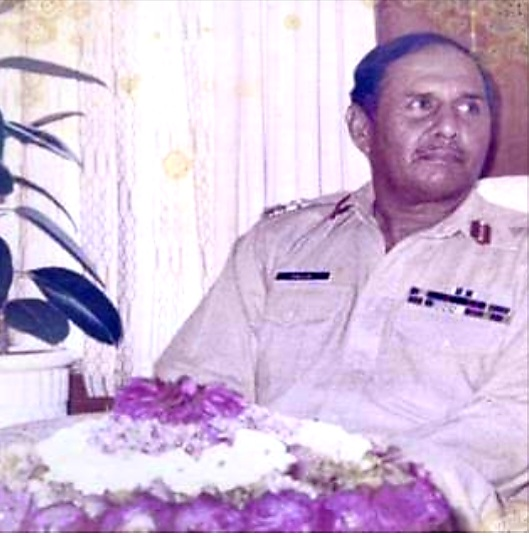

14th Director General of the Inter-Services Intelligence
- In office 27 May 1989 – August 1990
- Preceded by: Hamid Gul
- Succeeded by: Asad Durrani

Personal details
- Born: 28 February 1932 Multan, British India
- Died: 19 December 1995 (aged 63) Rawalpindi, Pakistan
- Awards: Hilal-e-Imtiaz (Military); Tamgha-e-Basalat

Military service
- Allegiance: Pakistan
- Branch/service: Pakistan Army
- Years of service: 1951–1985; 1988–1990 (second stint)
- Rank: Lt. Gen.
- Unit: 5 Horse Armoured Corps
- Commands: Commander 23rd Division; Commander I Corps; DG ISI
- Battles/wars: Indo-Pakistani War of 1965; Indo-Pakistan War of 1971; Soviet–Afghan War

Shamsur Rahman Kallue (Urdu: شمس الرحمان کلو; 28 February 1932 – 19 December 1995) was the fourteenth Director General of the ISI and was in office from May 1989 – August 1990. He retired as a lieutenant general from the Pakistan Army.

== Early life and career ==
Shams ur Rehman Kallue was the only surviving son of Brigadier Haji F. R. Kallue and Zubeda Begum (11 May 1910 - 5 March 1997). His father Brigadier Fazal ur Rehman (F.R.) Kallue graduated from Royal Military College, Sandhurst in 1927. He was commissioned in 5th Battalion of 5th Marhatta Light Infantry (MLI). Later, he became the first Indian Commanding Officer (CO) of 5th Battalion of the 8th Punjab Regiment.

Shamsur Rehman attended Doon's School, Dhera Doon from where he completed his senior Cambridge. Later he received his education from Gordon College, Rawalpindi. After that he joined 5th Pakistan Military Academy (PMA) long course and was commissioned in 1951 in 5 Probyn's Horse regiment. Kallue served as the ninth DG ISI after Hamid Gul.

The American intelligence agency CIA wanted him to meet Massoud to put forward U.S. interests in the region. Insight wrote (ibid):

The next day Massoud headed off through the Hindu Kush mountain range to the border of Pakistan for a secret meeting scheduled on another mountain side with Gen. Shamsur Rahman Kallue, whose orders the fiercely independent Massoud has consistently refused to follow. After crossing two mountain passes deep in snow on his way to The Rendezvous, Massoud received a message asking him to move up the appointment. He radioed back that it was impossible and he might be a day late because of weather. Gen. Kallue said he could not wait and returned to Islamabad, offering to leave a helicopter to bring Massoud to Islamabad... He declined the offer.

== Death ==
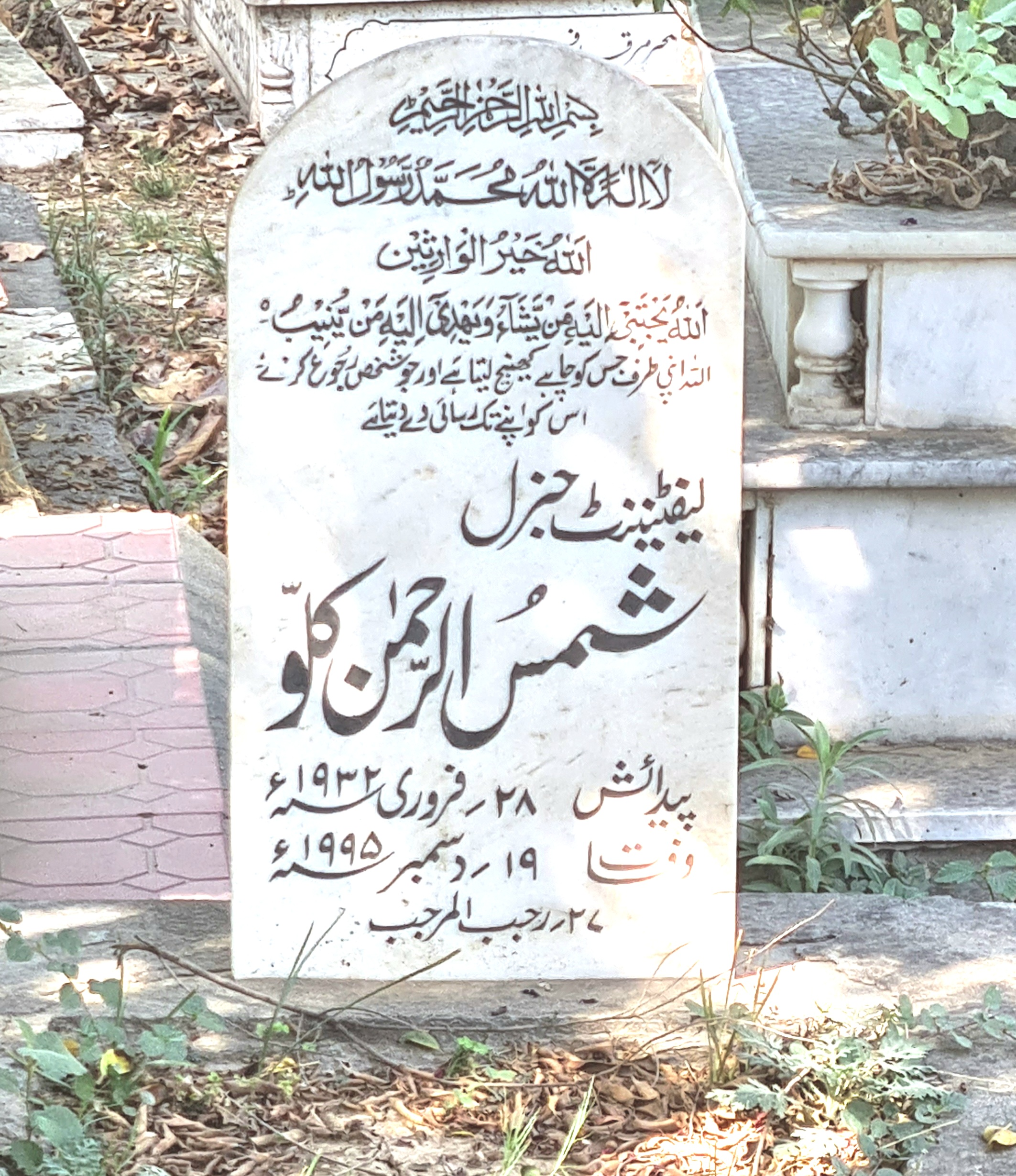
Kallue's grave at army cemetery Westridge, Rawalpindi

Shamsur Rahman Kallue died on December 19, 1995, in Rawalpindi and is buried at the army cemetery in Westridge, Rawalpindi. He is one of a few officers who did not own any property. The plot that was given to him during his service was given to the needy soldiers. A loner and a lifelong bachelor, he rented half portion of a house, where he lived with his mother until his death in 1995. His mother, Zubeda Begum, also died two years later on 5 March 1997 and was buried alongside her son in Army cemetery Westridge, Rawalpindi.

Military offices
Preceded by Hamid Gul	Director General of the Inter-Services Intelligence; 1987–1990	Succeeded by Asad Durrani
