= 1990 Pakistani general election =

- 24 October 1990

All 217 seats in National Assembly 109 seats seats needed for a majority
- Registered: 48,952,991
- Turnout: 45.17% (▲2.42pp)
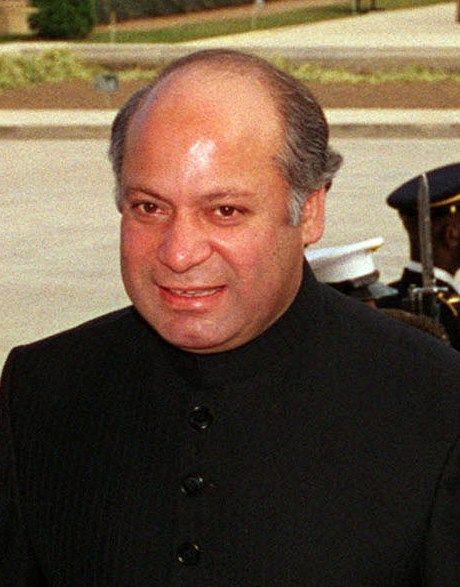

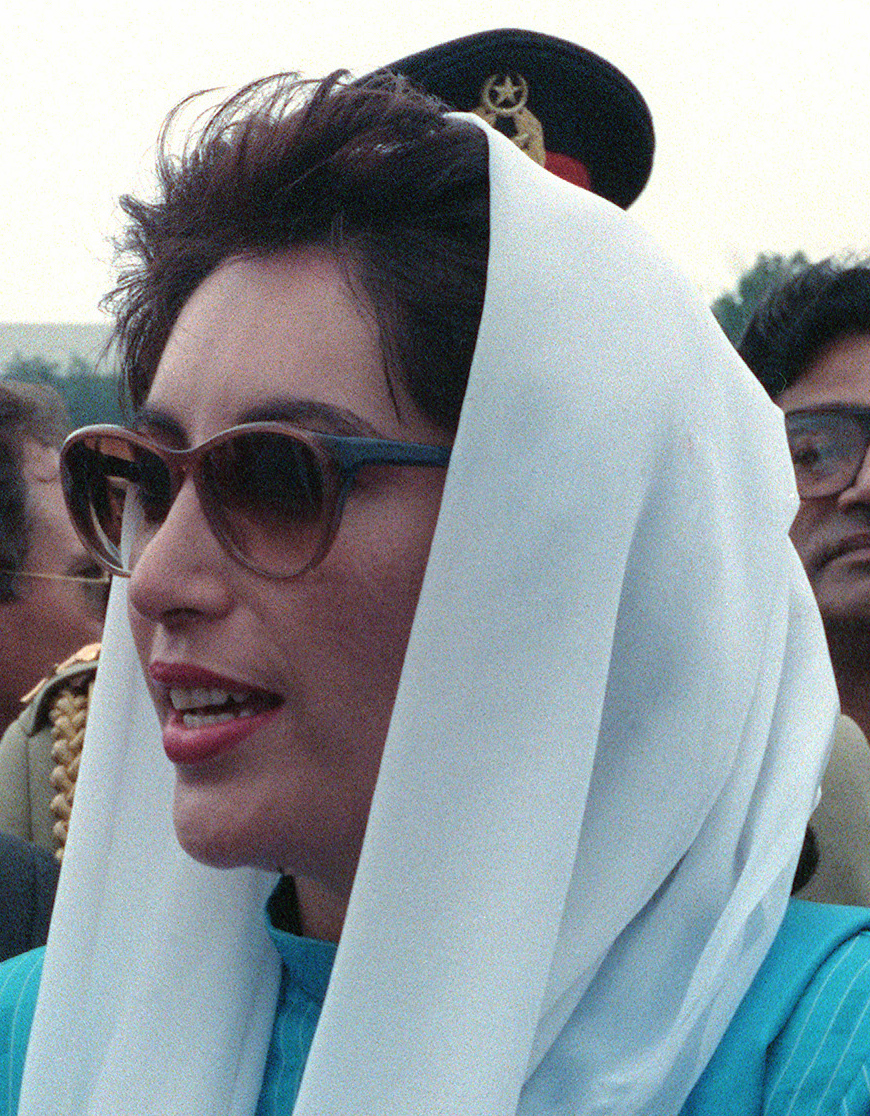
| | First party | Second party |
|---|---|---|
| Leader | Nawaz Sharif | Benazir Bhutto |
| Party | PML | PPP |
| Alliance | IJI | PDA |
| Last election | 56 | 94 |
| Seats after | 106 | 44 |
| Seat change | ▲50 | ▼50 |
| Popular vote | 7,908,513 | 7,795,218 |
| Percentage | 36.54% | 36.01% |
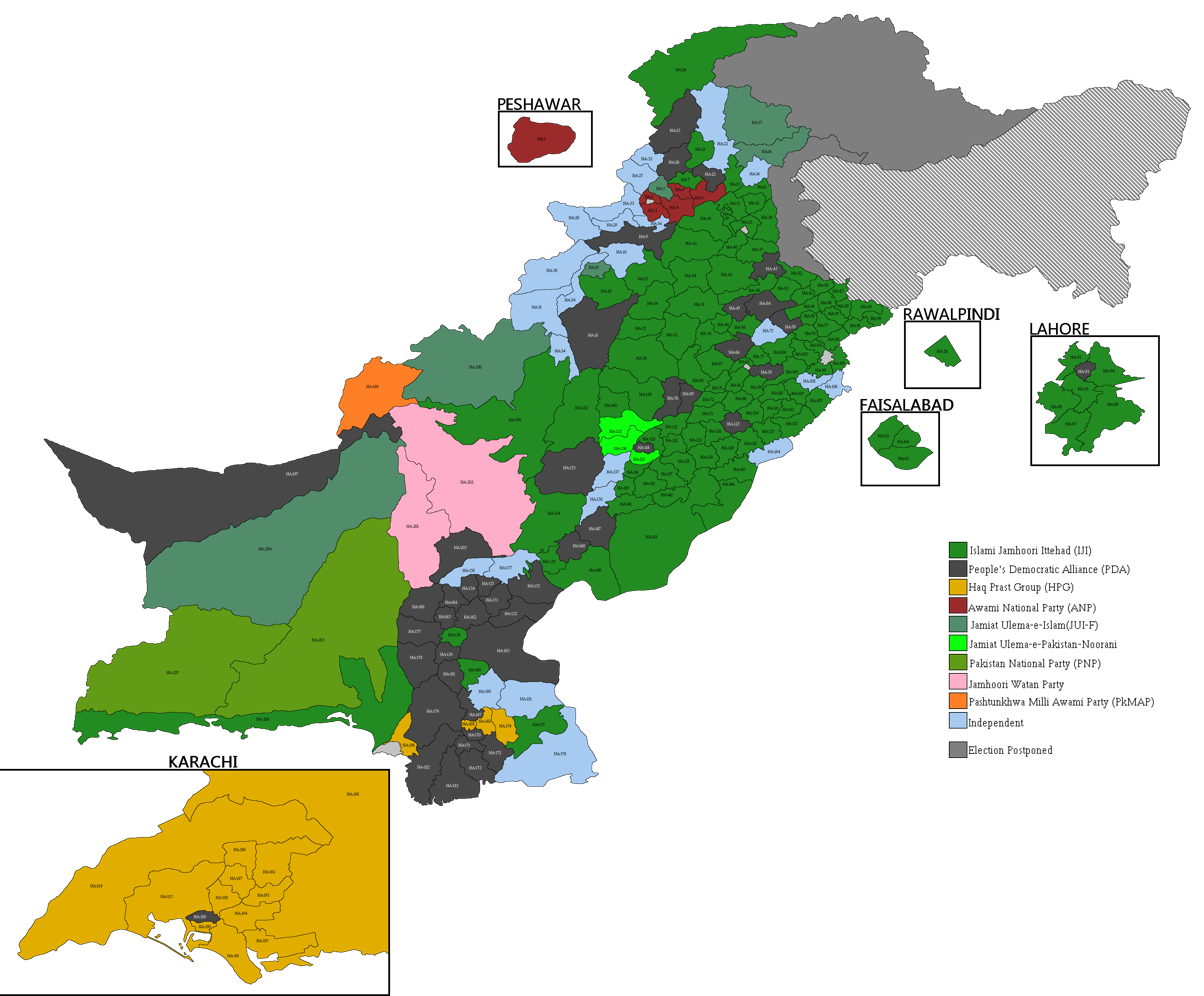
- Results constituency
Prime minister before election
Benazir Bhutto
PPP
Elected Prime minister
Nawaz Sharif
IJI

General elections were held in Pakistan on 24 October 1990 to elect the members of the National Assembly. The elections were primarily a contest between the People's Democratic Alliance (PDA, a four party alliance led by the ruling Pakistan Peoples Party (PPP) of Benazir Bhutto) and the conservative nine-party alliance, Islami Jamhoori Ittehad (IJI) headed by Nawaz Sharif.

President Ghulam Ishaq Khan dissolved the National Assembly and dismissed Bhutto's government in August 1990 on charges of corruption and maladministration. However, the PPP was still extremely popular and there was a fear amongst anti-PPP forces that it might be re-elected. Numerous steps were taken by Ishaq with help of the military establishment to sway the results in favour of the IJI, including the appointment of IJI chairman Ghulam Mustafa Jatoi as caretaker Prime Minister. Despite their efforts, the PPP remained ahead in opinion polls.

However, the result was a surprise victory for the IJI, which won 111 of the 207 general seats (a further ten were reserved for minority voters). The PDA won just 44 seats amidst a voter turnout of only 45%. The IJI's parliamentary leader Sharif became Prime Minister while Bhutto became the Opposition Leader. In 2012 the Supreme Court ruled that the elections had been rigged.

== Background ==
The PPP led by Benazir Bhutto had won a plurality of seats in the 1988 election and Bhutto became Prime Minister. However by 1990 there was discontent over rising lawlessness, allegations of corruption and the failure of the government to fulfill the promises it had made during the 1988 campaign.

== Parties ==
The PPP formed an alliance with three other parties, Tehreek-e-Nifaz-e-Fiqh-e-Jafariya, Tehreek-e-Istiqlal and the Pakistan Muslim League (Chatta), running under the name People's Democratic Alliance.

== Campaign ==
By the start of the campaign reports suggested that Bhutto and the PDA were in a stronger position as the caretaker government failed to produce sufficient evidence to prove any charges against her.

At the end of the campaign Bhutto led hundreds of thousands of supporters in a procession in Lahore, while Sharif held a rally for about ten thousand nearby.

== Electoral fraud ==
On 19 October 2012, the Supreme Court of Pakistan ruled on a petition by Asghar Khan, requesting that the court probe allegations that the 1990 elections had been rigged. The court officially ruled that two Army Generals – Mirza Aslam Baig and Asad Durrani (head of the ISI) – along with President Ghulam Ishaq Khan – had provided financial assistance to favoured parties. The motive was to deliberately weaken the mandate of the Pakistan Peoples Party. It was believed that the PPP, led by Benazir Bhutto, was a liability to the nation.

== Results ==
IJI won the popular vote by a very narrow margin of only around 100,000 votes, but the narrow victory in the popular vote translated into 106 seats for IJI against the PDA's 44 seats. The popular argument regarding PDA's huge loss of seats is that the PDA's vote, despite being almost equal to that of IJI, was much more spread out whereas IJI's vote bank was more concentrated. This resulted in PDA candidates losing to IJI candidates by narrow margins on many seats.

| Party | Votes | % | Seats | +/– |
|---|---|---|---|---|
| Islami Jamhoori Ittehad | 7,908,492 | 36.54 | 106 | +50 |
| People's Democratic Alliance | 7,796,238 | 36.02 | 44 | –50 |
| Haq Parast | 1,171,525 | 5.41 | 15 | New |
| Jamiat Ulema-e-Islam (F) | 622,214 | 2.87 | 6 | −1 |
| Awami National Party | 356,160 | 1.65 | 6 | +4 |
| Jamiat Ulema-e-Pakistan (Noorani) | 310,953 | 1.44 | 3 | New |
| Pakistan Awami Tehrik | 237,492 | 1.10 | 0 | New |
| Jamhoori Wattan Party | 129,431 | 0.60 | 2 | New |
| Pakistan National Party | 127,287 | 0.59 | 2 | +2 |
| Pashtunkhwa Milli Awami Party | 73,635 | 0.34 | 1 | New |
| Sindh National Front | 51,990 | 0.24 | 0 | New |
| Pakistan Democratic Party | 51,645 | 0.24 | 0 | 0 |
| Balochistan National Movement | 51,297 | 0.24 | 0 | New |
| Pakistan Hindu Party | 33,847 | 0.16 | 1 | New |
| Sindh National Alliance | 31,125 | 0.14 | 0 | New |
| Pakistan Masihi Party | 23,050 | 0.11 | 1 | New |
| Pakistan Masihi Ittehad | 19,534 | 0.09 | 1 | New |
| Punjabi Pakhtun Ittehad (Sarwar Awan Group) | 17,967 | 0.08 | 0 | New |
| United Christians Front | 14,594 | 0.07 | 0 | –1 |
| Awami Tehreek (Paleejo Group) | 14,307 | 0.07 | 0 | New |
| Pakistan Christian Association | 14,271 | 0.07 | 0 | New |
| Qaumi Inqilab Party | 12,931 | 0.06 | 0 | New |
| Pakistan Muslim League (Qayyum) | 8,521 | 0.04 | 0 | 0 |
| Punjabi Pakhtun Ittehad (Mir Hazar Khan) | 2,489 | 0.01 | 0 | New |
| Pakistan Seriaki Party | 2,160 | 0.01 | 0 | New |
| Saraiki Qaumi Ittehad | 2,023 | 0.01 | 0 | New |
| Jamaat-e-Ahl-e-Sunnat Pakistan | 1,992 | 0.01 | 0 | 0 |
| Pakistan Aqiliati Ittehad | 1,969 | 0.01 | 0 | New |
| Pakistan Christian Congress | 835 | 0.00 | 0 | New |
| Hazara Front (Mahaz-e-Hazara) | 678 | 0.00 | 0 | 0 |
| Pakistan Mazdoor Kissan Party (Fatehyab Group) | 647 | 0.00 | 0 | New |
| Jamiat Ulema-e-Pakistan (Niazi) | 412 | 0.00 | 0 | New |
| National Democratic Party | 204 | 0.00 | 0 | 0 |
| Sindh National Alliance (Hamida Khuro Group) | 139 | 0.00 | 0 | New |
| Independents | 2,554,201 | 11.80 | 29 | −19 |
| Total | 21,646,255 | 100.00 | 217 | 0 |
| Valid votes | 21,646,255 | 98.92 | | |
| Invalid/blank votes | 235,849 | 1.08 | | |
| Total votes | 21,882,104 | 100.00 | | |
| Registered voters/turnout | 48,952,991 | 44.70 | | |
Source: CLEA
