= Islami Jamhuri Ittihad =

Political coalition in Pakistan (1988–1993)

Islami Jamhuri Ittihad Islamic Democratic Alliance اسلامی جمہوری اتحاد
- Abbreviation: IJI; IDA
- Leader: Manzoor Wattoo
- President: Ghulam Mustafa Jatoi
- Secretary-General: Abdul Ghafoor Ahmed
- Founder: Ghulam Mustafa Jatoi; Muhammad Khan Junejo
- Founded: November 8, 1988; 38 years ago
- Dissolved: July 18, 1993; 33 years ago
- Succeeded by: PML-N
- Headquarters: Islamabad
- Ideology: Conservatism; Factions: Ziaism
- Political position: Right-wing
- Religion: Islam
- Slogan: نو ستارے بھائی بھائ بے نظیر کی شامت آئی "Nau Sitāre Bhā'ī Bhā'ī Benazīr kī Shāmat Ā'ī" (lit. 'Nine Stars are brothers, here comes Benazir's trouble')
- Seats in the National Assembly (before dissolution): 111 / 207

Party flag

The Islami Jamhuri Ittihad (IJI), (Note: Urdu: اسلامی جمہوری اتحاد) also known by its English name Islamic Democratic Alliance (IDA), was a Pakistani political alliance existing between 1988 and 1993, consisting of nine right-wing conservative parties that opposed the democratic socialist and liberal Pakistan People's Party led by Benazir Bhutto. The alliance comprised nine parties, of which the major components were the Pakistan Muslim League (PML), National Peoples Party (NPP) and Jamaat-e-Islami (JI), with PML accounting for 80% of the IJI's electoral candidates. The Inter-Services Intelligence (ISI) agency, under director Hamid Gul, had a major role in forming the right-of-centre political alliance. Care had been taken to ensure that the alliance comprised nine parties to generate comparison with the nine-party Pakistan National Alliance (PNA) that had campaigned against Zulfikar Ali Bhutto-led PPP in 1977. The IJI was considered a Zia ul-Haq loyalist alliance.

The head of the party was Ghulam Mustafa Jatoi, but its most resourceful leader was Nawaz Sharif, a young industrialist whom Zia ul-Haq had appointed chief minister of Punjab. Sharif was vying for control of the Pakistan Muslim League, which was headed at that time by former Prime Minister Muhammad Khan Junejo.

It won only fifty-three seats in the National Assembly, compared with ninety-two won by the PPP. Most IJI seats were won in Punjab. Nawaz Sharif emerged from the 1988 elections as the most powerful politician outside the PPP. In December 1988, he succeeded in forming an IJI administration in Punjab and became the province's chief minister. It was from this power base that he waged the political battles that eventually led to his becoming prime minister in 1990. In the supercharged atmosphere of the 1990 elections, the electorate surprised observers. Neither the IJI nor the PPP was expected to come up with a firm mandate to rule. Yet the IJI received a strong mandate to govern, winning 105 seats versus forty-five seats for the Pakistan Democratic Alliance (PDA), of which the PPP was the main component in the National Assembly. Opposition groups alleged large scale selective rigging of seats to not just ensure an IJI victory but also prevent those opposed to Military influence from being elected.

In the 1993 national elections, the IJI coalition no longer existed to bring together all the anti-PPP forces. The religious parties expended most of their energies trying to form a workable electoral alliance rather than bolstering the candidacy of Nawaz Sharif, the only person capable of challenging Benazir Bhutto.

== List of Allied Parties ==
The following is a list of the nine allied political parties.

Party name	Date Joined	Date Left	Reason
Pakistan Muslim League (PML)			
National People's Party (NPP)		March 1992	Dismissed
Jamaat Islami		5 May 1992	Left in protest over the government's support of the Mujahidin government in Kabul, Afghanistan.
Jamiat Ulema-e-Islam			
Nizam-i-Mustafa Group			
Markazi Jamiat Ahle Hadith (Lakhvi group)			
Jamaat-ul Mashaikh (Sahebzada Fazle Haq Group)			
Azad Group			
Hizbullah Jihad		September 1991	Expelled due to association with opposition parties.

== Controversies ==
Islami Jamhuri Ittihad was an establishment-backed political alliance against the Benazir Bhutto-led PPP, formed after doling out money to the politicians, which caused the PPP's defeat in the said general elections. In 1993, former Air Chief Asghar Khan had moved SC against foul play in the 1990 general elections. The case is also known as Mehrangate scandal.

== Bibliography ==
- Husain Haqqani. Pakistan: Between Mosque and Military, Washington D.C.: Carnegie Endowment for International Peace, 2005.
