= Asad Durrani =

Pakistan Army general (born 1941)

Asad Ahmed Durrani HI (M)
- Born: Asad Ahmed Durrani; February 7, 1941 (age 85); Rawalpindi, British India
- Military career
- Allegiance: Pakistan
- Branch: Pakistan Army
- Service years: 1959–1993
- Rank: Lieutenant General
- Nickname: Fire Fox
- Unit: Corps of Military Intelligence
- Commands: DG ISI; DG Military Intelligence; Judge Advocate General Branch; Instructor at Command and Staff College; Instructor National Defence University; 350th Military Intelligence Brigade
- Conflicts: Indo-Pakistani war of 1965; Bangladesh Liberation War; Indo-Pakistani war of 1971; Soviet–Afghan War; Operation Midnight Jackal
- Awards: Hilal-i-Imtiaz

Asad Ahmed Durrani (Urdu: اسد أحمد درانی; born 7 February 1941) is a retired 3-star rank general in the Pakistan Army and presently a commentator, speaker and author. Durrani previously served as a Director General of the ISI and former Director General of the Pakistan Army's Military Intelligence.

== Early life and education ==
Durrani was born in 1941 in Rawalpindi, British India into a Durrani Pashtun family. From 1957 to 1959, he attended the Government College of Lahore, now a university, where he received a Bachelor of Science degree.

== Military career ==
He joined the Pakistan Army in 1959. and subsequently joined the Pakistan Military Academy In 1960, he was commissioned as Second Lieutenant in the army as a gunner officer. As a captain he participated in the Indo-Pakistani war of 1965, where he commanded his company. In 1968, he was promoted to major. He also took part in the 1971 war against India.

Durrani has been in key posts, including an instructorship at the officers' academy and later at the Command and Staff College in Quetta, Director General Military Intelligence from 1988 to 1989; Director General of the ISI from 1990 to 1991, Inspector General Training and Evaluation at the General Headquarters and Commandant at the National Defence College.

Durrani is a graduate from the General Staff Academy, Germany. He has also been Pakistan's military attaché to Germany from 1980 to 1984. After retiring from the army, he was Pakistan's ambassador to Germany (1994–97) and Saudi Arabia (2000–02).

== Controversies ==
In 1994, former Prime Minister Nawaz Sharif accused Durrani and Mirza Aslam Beg of wanting to sell "heroin to pay for the country's covert military operations in early 1991."

In 2008, Durrani acknowledged "distributing money to the alliance against Benazir Bhutto" in the 1993 Pakistani general election.

=== Al-Jazeera interview ===
In 2015, Durrani told Mehdi Hasan in an Al Jazeera interview at the Oxford Union that it was “probable” the Pakistani government knew Osama bin Laden’s location and “the idea was that at the right time, his location would be revealed. And the right time would have been when you can get the necessary quid pro quo.”

=== The Spy Chronicles ===
In 2018, he co-authored The Spy Chronicles: RAW, ISI and the Illusion of Peace with A. S. Dulat, former head of the Research and Analysis Wing. He was supposed to attend the book release with Dulat in India, but the Indian government denied him a visa. Subsequently, he received a summons to appear before General Headquarters over the book and was placed on the Exit Control List.

Former Prime Minister of Pakistan Nawaz Sharif demanded that the National Security Committee (NSC) should discuss the book. However, in October 2018, Asad Durrani's lawyer said they had not received any notice of an inquiry and sought the removal of Asad Durrani's name from the Exit Control List.

Shazar Shafat, a security analyst, suggests two reasons in South Asian Voices (hosted by The Stimson Center) as to why Asad Durrani may be facing the backlash. The first is related to Durrani's comments on Akhand Bharat in the book and the second is in relation to comments on Kulbhushan Jadhav. However, a report by CNN found that the book (as well as a pirated PDF version) was freely available in Pakistan and that the Pakistani governments "overreaction", according to Hassan Askari Rizvi and other defence analysts, may be because Durrani did not get prior permissions for such a book.

On 22 February 2019, Asad Durrani was found guilty of violating Pakistan's Military Code of Conduct for co-writing the book. Asad Durrani's pension and other allowances have been withdrawn and it is yet to be decided if he should be taken off the Exit Control List or not.

== Books ==
=== Non-fiction ===
- The Spy Chronicles: RAW, ISI and the Illusion of Peace (with A. S. Dulat) (HarperCollins, 2018) ISBN 978-9352779253
- Pakistan Adrift: Navigating Troubled Waters (Hurst, 2018) ISBN 978-1849049610

=== Fiction ===
- Honour Among Spies (HarperCollins, 2020) ISBN 9789353579814

Military offices
Preceded by Shamsur Rahman Kallu	Director General of the Inter-Services Intelligence; 1990 – 1992	Succeeded by Javed Nasir
