= Director-General of Inter-Services Intelligence =

Intelligence appointment of Pakistan

- Incumbent; Lt Gen Asim Malik since 30 September 2024
- Inter-Services Intelligence
- Abbreviation: DG ISI
- Member of: National Security Council
- Residence: Chaklala, Rawalpindi
- Appointer: Prime Minister
- Term length: 5 years
- Inaugural holder: Syed Shahid Hamid
- Formation: 1948

The Director-General (DG) is head of the Inter-Services Intelligence (ISI), Pakistan's premier intelligence service, operationally responsible for providing critical national security and intelligence assessment to the government of Pakistan. Brigadier Syed Shahid Hamid had conceived the idea of ISI and became its first director-general.

The current DG of ISI is Lt. General Asim Malik since 30 September 2024.

== List of directors ==
#	Portrait	Name	Start of term	End of term
1		Brigadier Syed Shahid Hamid; HJ	1 January 1948	22 August 1950
2		Brigadier Mirza Hamid Hussain	23 August 1950	May 1951
3		Colonel Muhammad Afzal Malik	May 1951	April 1953
4		Brigadier Syed Ghawas	April 1953	August 1955
5		Brigadier Malik Sher Bahadur	August 1955	September 1957
6		Brigadier Muhammad Hayat	September 1957	October 1959
7		Brigadier Riaz Hussain	October 1959	May 1966
8		Major General Muhammad Akbar Khan	May 1966	September 1971
9		Major General Ghulam Jilani Khan	September 1971	16 September 1978
10		Lieutenant General Muhammad Riaz Khan	17 September 1978	26 April 1979
11		Lieutenant General Akhtar Abdur Rahman; NI(M) HI(M)	27 April 1979	29 March 1987
12		Lieutenant General Hamid Gul; HI(M) SBt	29 March 1987	29 May 1989
13		Lieutenant General Shamsur Rahman Kallu; HI(M) TBt	30 May 1989	August 1990
14		Lieutenant General Asad Durrani; HI(M)	21 August 1990	13 March 1992
15		Lieutenant General Javed Nasir; HI(M) SBt	14 March 1992	13 May 1993
16		Lieutenant General Javed Ashraf Qazi; HI(M) SBt	14 May 1993	October 1995
17		Lieutenant General Naseem Rana	October 1995	October 1998
18		Lieutenant General Ziauddin Butt; HI(M)	October 1998	12 October 1999
19		Lieutenant General Mahmud Ahmed; HI(M)	20 October 1999	7 October 2001
20		Lieutenant General Ehsan ul Haq; HI(M)	7 October 2001	5 October 2004
21		Lieutenant General Ashfaq Parvez Kayani; HI(M) SI(M) TI(M)	5 October 2004	8 October 2007
22		Lieutenant General Nadeem Taj; HI(M) TBt	9 October 2007	29 September 2008
23		Lieutenant General Ahmad Shuja Pasha; HI(M)	1 October 2008	18 March 2012
24		Lieutenant General Zaheerul Islam; HI(M)	19 March 2012	7 November 2014
25		Lieutenant General Rizwan Akhtar	7 November 2014	11 December 2016
26		Lieutenant General Naveed Mukhtar	11 December 2016	25 October 2018
27		Lieutenant General Asim Munir; HI(M)	25 October 2018	16 June 2019
28		Lieutenant General Faiz Hameed; HI(M)	17 June 2019	19 Nov 2021
29		Lieutenant General Nadeem Anjum	20 November 2021	29 September 2024
30		Lieutenant General Asim Malik	30 September 2024	Incumbent
