= Lahore–Karachi Motorway =

Motorway in Pakistan

Lahore-Karachi Motorway
- ایم موٹروے
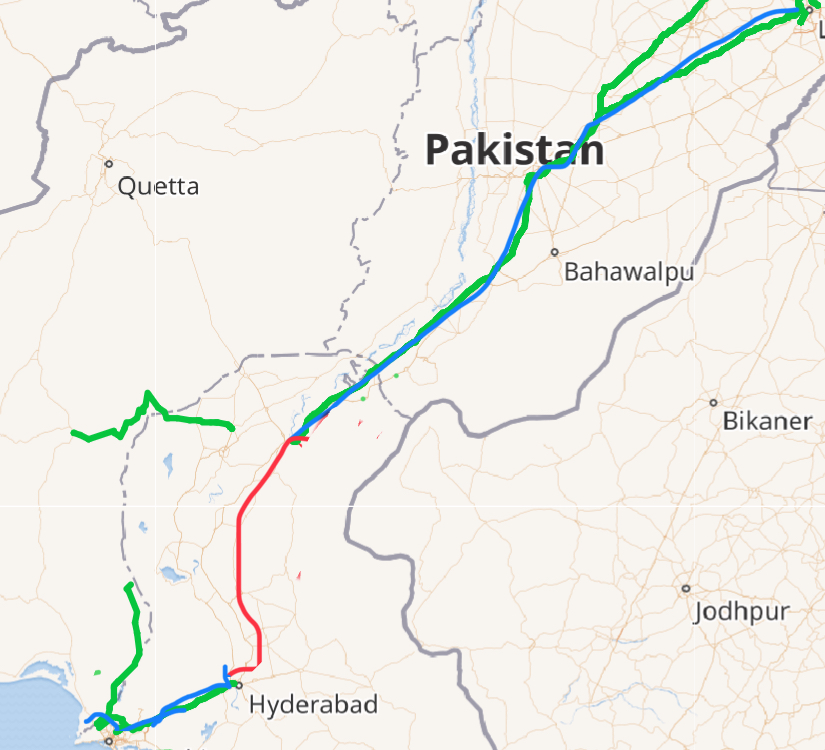
- Proposed section in red, built section in blue.

Route information
- Existed: 2014–present

Major junctions
- From: Lahore
- Gulshan-e-Ravi Lahore Motorways Interchange North; Darkhana; Shah Shamz Tabrez Interchange; Sukkur Hyderabad
- To: Karachi

Section 1
- From: Lahore
- Major intersections: Babu Sabu Interchange M-3 and M-2 Junction
- To: Abdul Hakeem

Section 2
- From: Abdul Hakeem
- Major intersections: Khanewal Shah Shamz Tabrez Interchange > Multan
- To: Sukkur

Section 3
- From: Under Construction Sukkur
- To: Under Construction Jamshoro & Hyderabad

Section 4
- From: Jamshoro & Hyderabad
- To: Karachi

Location
- Country: Pakistan

Highway system
- Roads in Pakistan

The Lahore-Karachi Motorway is a motorway in Pakistan that links Lahore to Karachi. It is divided into six motorways (M-2, M-4, M-3, M-5, M-6 and M-9). The motorway has 58 exits, with 15 of them not built yet. It is 1,111.7km long. It is a very vital motorway as it links Karachi to Lahore. However, this motorway is partially operational because section 3 (M-6 to M-9) is under construction. It was approved by ECNEC in 2014 and inaugurated in 2015. The Grand Trunk Road serves as an alternate for the route, while the Indus Highway is an alternate for Section 3. It is a 6-4 lane motorway with a proposed expansion to a 6-4-8 motorway.

== Sections ==
=== Section 1 (Thokar Niaz Baig *Lahore* to Abdul Hakim) ===
Section 1 starts at Lahore in Thokar Niaz Baig at M-2. After Ravi Toll Plaza, Section 1 turns to M-3. Section 1 ends at the junction of M-3 and M-4 just 500 meters away from Abdul Hakeem.

=== Section 2 (Abdul Hakeem to Sukkur) ===
Section 2 is the longest section of the LKM, being M-4 and M-5 Motorway. Like most of Section 1, most of section 2 was inaugurated in 2019. This section runs from the M-3 junction with M-4 to M-6 in Sukkur. The section is divided into two parts (2A and 2B).

==== Section 2A (Abdul Hakeem to Multan) ====
Section 2A is one part of Section 2 that runs from M-3 to Multan. If Section 2A is considered as a separate section, then this is the shortest section of the LKM.

==== Section 2B (Multan to Sukkur) ====
Section 2B runs from Multan to Sukkur, fully M-5. This is the longest part of Section 2.

=== Section 3 (Sukkur to Hyderabad) ===
This section is under construction and is entirely in M-6. This is the only missing link in LKM. The Grand Trunk Road and the Indus Highway are alternatives to Section 3.

=== Section 4 (Hyderabad to Karachi) ===
This section is the very last section of the motorway and is entirely in M-9. This section is also known as the Super Highway. M-9 is the shortest section of LKM.

== Junctions and exits ==
DISCLAIMER: EXIT NUMBERING IS BASED ON LAHORE KARACHI MOTORWAY.

=== Section 1 (M-2 to M-4 via M-3) ===
M-2 Motorway Junctions
Interchange	Junction	West bound exits	East bound exits
M-2 Zero Point, Lahore	Exit 1	Start of motorway	Road continues as Abdul Sattar EdhiRoad to Lahore
M-2 Zero Point, Lahore	Exit 1	N-5 – to Multan	N-5 – to Lahore, Canal Bank Road to Lahore
Babu Sabu Interchange	Exit 2	Band Road to Chowk Yatim Khana, LRR	Band Road to Chowk Yatim Khana, LRR
Ravi Toll Plaza
M-3 Lahore-Abdul Hakeem	Exit 3	M-3 – Lahore-Abdul Hakeem Motorway	To Abdul Hakeem and Jaranwala

M3 Motorway Junctions
North bound exits	Junction	South bound exits
M-2 – Islamabad-Lahore Motorway	Exit 4	M-2 – Islamabad-Lahore Motorway
Sheikhupura	Exit 5	Sharaqpur
Nankana Sahib	Exit 6	Khiaray Kalan
Jaranwala	Exit 7	Syedwala
Samundri	Exit 8	Tandlianwala
Rajana, Toba Tek Singh	Exit 9	Kamalia
Shorkot Cantonment	Exit 10	Pir Mahal
Darkhana Toll Plaza
Towards Abdul Hakeem & Multan M-4 – Pindi Bhattian Multan Motorway	Exit 11	Towards Shorkot & Faisalabad

=== Section 2 (M-4 to M-6 via M-5) ===
==== Section 2A M-4 Motorway Junctions (M-3 to Multan) ====
M-3 –	Exit 12	Towards Pir Mahal & Lahore
Abdul Hakeem	Exit 13	Pul Bagar Rd
Makhdoom Pur Pahoran	Exit 14	Kabirwala Road
Kabirwala	Exit 15	Khanewal Road
Shamkot (Khanewal)	Exit 16	N-5
Shah Rukn-e-Alam (Multan)	Exit 17	Vehari Road
Shah Shams Tabrez (Multan)	Exit 18	N-5
Shershah M-5 –	Exit 19	Multan
Multan Toll Plaza

==== Section 2B M-5 Motorway Junctions ====
M-5 Motorway Junctions
Interchange	Junction	South-bound exits
Shershah Interchange	Exit 20	Start of motorway
Shershah Interchange	Exit 20	Bahawalpur Road
Shujaabad Interchange	Exit 21	Lodhran Road
Jalalpur Pirwala Interchange	Exit 22	Lodhran Road
Jhangra Interchange	Exit 23	Bahawalpur-DHA N-5
Uch Sharif Interchange	Exit 24	Alipur Rd
Tarinda	Exit 25	Tarinda Muhammad Panah Road
Zahir Pir Interchange	Exit 26	Chachran Sharif Road
Rahim Yar Khan Interchange	Exit 27	Rahim Yar Khan N-5
Guddu Interchange	Exit 28	Sadiqabad Kashmore Road
Ghotki Interchange	Exit 29	JDW Unit 3 Sugar Mill Road
Pano Aqil Interchange	Exit 30	Local Road
Sukkur Interchange	Exit 31	Rohri/Sukkur (N-5) Hyderabad (M-6) Roa
Sukkur Toll Plaza

=== Section 3 (M-6 to M-9) ===
This is a section under construction. Sukkur Interchange is the current junction constructed. [3]

M-6 Motorway Junctions
Sukkur Interchange	Exit 31	Rohri/Sukkur (N-5)
Proposed	Exit 32	
Proposed	Exit 33	
Proposed	Exit 34	
Proposed	Exit 35	
Proposed	Exit 36	
Proposed	Exit 37	
Proposed	Exit 38	
Proposed	Exit 39	
Proposed	Exit 40	
Proposed	Exit 41	
Proposed	Exit 42	
Proposed	Exit 43	
Proposed	Exit 44	
Proposed	Exit 45	
Hyderabad-Jamshoro Toll Plaza
Jamshoro Interchange	Exit 46	To Hyderabad via N-55

=== Section 4 (M-9 to Karachi) ===
M-9 Motorway Junctions
Jamshoro Interchange	Exit 46	To Hyderabad via N-55
Hyderabad M-9 Toll Plaza
Loni Kot Interchange	Exit 47	To Bholari via N-5
Thana Bulakhan Interchange	Exit 48	To Thana Bulakhan
Nooriabad Interchange	Exit 49	To Nooriabad

Goth Wesani Interchange	Exit 50	To Goth Wesani
Kirthar Interchange	Exit 51	To Kirthar National Park
Edhi Village Interchange	Exit 52	To Edhi Village
DHA City Interchange	Exit 53	To DHA City Interchange

N-5 Link Road	Exit 54	To N-5 via M-9-N-5 Link Road
Bahria Town Karachi	Exit 55	To Bahria Town Karachi
Dumba Goth Interchange	Exit 56	To Dumba Goth
Malir Interchange	Exit 57	To Malir
Karachi Toll Plaza

Karachi Motorways Interchange	Exit 58	To M-10 Motorway (Karachi Northern Bypass)
Continues as the Karachi Super Highway.
