= Kot Naka =

- Village

Kot Naka is a village in Pindi Bhattian Tehsil, Hafizabad, Punjab, Pakistan. It is 2.5 km from the M-3 ( Lahore–Abdul Hakeem) motorway. The nearest villages are Dera Kashmirrian (1km), Chah Shadiwala (1.5 km), Fateke (2 km) and Thatha Langer (3.5 km).

== See also ==
- Pindi Bhattian Tehsil
- Pindi Bhattian
- Thatha Khero Matmal
