= List of roads in Lahore =

This is a list of streets and roads in Lahore, Punjab, Pakistan. Some roads are very long, so only sections inside Lahore are mentioned. It is difficult to determine exactly which portion of a road lies within the city.

Street	From - towards	Lane(s)	Length (km)	Description
Mall Road	Chauburji - Fortress Stadium	6	9	
Hall Road	Regal Chowk - McLeod Road	4	0.45	
Manhala Road	Batapur (G.T Road) - Hudiara Drain	2	16	
Gulberg Boulevard	Siddique Trade Center - Kalma Chowk	6	3.7	
Main Boulevard Faisal Town	PU - Akbar Chowk	4	2.3	
MM Alam road	Main Market - Firdous Market	8	1.5	
Ferozepur Road	Qurtaba Chowk - Sue-e-Asal Road	8	28	
Jail road	Qurtaba Chowk - Cant	6	5	
Queen's road	Qurtaba Chowk - Charing Cross	4	1.5	
Lawrence road	Regal Chowk - China Chowk	4	1.9	
Mozang road	Mozang Chungi adda - Lahore Zoo	4	1.3	
Lytton road	Qurtaba Chowk - Babari Chowk	4	1.5	
Canal Bank Road	Maraka - Khaira	8	43	Signal Free Corridor
Maulana Karbasi Road	PIA Main Buli'rd - Allah Hoo Chowk	4	2.5	Named After Encyclopedia
Wahdat road	Ferozpur Road - Multan Road	6	6.5	
Raiwind road	Canal Bank Road - Raiwind Town	4	27	
Walton road	Qainchee bridge - R.A. bazaar	6	5.7	
Lahore Ring Road	M2 Motorway - Maraka	6	71	Limited Access Road
Model Town Link Road	Club Chowk, Model Town - Honda Mor	6	1.9	
Peco Road	Peco Factory - Ferozepur Road	6	1.9	
College Road, Township	Akbar Chowk - Arain Chowk	4	4.2	
Moulana Shoukat Ali Road	Peco Factory - Canal Bank Road	6	5.6	
Madar-e-Millat Road	Pindi Stop, Peco Road - Bagharian Chowk, Green Town	6	4.7	
Chaudhary Rehmat Ali Road	Peco Road - College Road	4	4.4	
Bagharian Road	Rana Riaz Chowk, Green Town - Bagharian Chowk, Green Town	4	2.9	
Nomi Road	Pulley Stop, Green Town - Square Water Tank, Green Town	4	1.1	
Nazaria-e-Pakistan Avenue	College Road, Green Town - Thokar Niaz Beg	6	6	
Khayaban-e-Firdousi	Shok Chowk, Moulana Shoukat Ali Road - Shaukat Khanum Hospital	6	4.1	
Khayaban-e-Jinnah	Shaukat Khanum Hospital - Raiwind Road	6	5	
Valancia Main Boulevard	Khayaban-e-Jinnah - Audits & Accounts Society	6	3.5	
Wapda Avenue	Wapda Town Round About - Wapda Town Grid Station	4	1.9	
Abbaseen Avenue	Khayaban-e-Jinnah - Rehmat Chowk, Chashma Road	6	2	
Lower Mall	Bhati Chowk - Chowburji	6	2.7	
Bahawalpur Road	Qurtaba Chowk - Chowburji	4	1.1	
Multan Road	Chowburji - Sundar	6	32	Part of N-5 National Highway
McLeod Road	Lahore Railway Station - GPO Chowk, Mall Road	4	2.5	
Napier Road	GPO Chowk, Mall Road - Hospital Road	4	0.5	
Mayo Hospital Road	Nila Gunbad Chowk - McLeod Road	2	0.6	
Chamberlain Road	Circular Road - Mayo Hospital	2	0.85	
Railway Road	Railway Station – Gawalmandi	2	1.7	

== Names of road after ==
- Abbot road named after Sir James Abbott, Pakistani city Abbottabad also named after him.
- Chamberlain road named after a soldier Chamberlain
- Nicholson road named after a soldier Nicholson
- Beadon road name after Commissioner or Deputy Commissioner Beadon
- Brandreth road name after Commissioner or Deputy Commissioner Brandreth
- Cooper road name after Commissioner or Deputy Commissioner Mr. Cooper
- Cust road name after Commissioner or Deputy Commissioner Cust
- Lake road name after Commissioner or Deputy Commissioner Lake
- Hall road name after Commissioner or Deputy Commissioner Hall
- Nisbet road name after Commissioner or Deputy Commissioner Col. Perry Nisbet
- Durand road named after former Lt. Governor.
- Davies road named after former Lt. Governor.
- Mcleod road named after former Lt. Governor.
- Egerton road named after former Lt. Governor.
- Montgomery road named after former Lt. Governor.
- Maclagan road named after Major Gen. Maclagan
- Temple road named after Sir Richard Temple (later he became governor of Bombay)
- Thornton road named after civil servant
- Roberts road name after Judicial Commissioner A.A. Roberts
- Edwardes road named after Herbert Edwardes
- Napier road named after Charles James Napier
- Lawrence named after former Governor General or Viceroy.
- Mayo named after former Governor General or Viceroy.
- Lytton named after former Governor General or Viceroy.

== Current and old names ==
Current name	Old Name(s)
Nishter Road	Brandreth < Kilian Wali Road

== See also ==
- Transport in Lahore
- Transport in Pakistan
