= Bahuman =

Village in Punjab, Pakistan

- Village
- Country: Pakistan
- Province: Punjab
- Division: Lahore
- District: Sheikhupura

Bahuman is a village located in the district of Sheikhupura near the M-3 motorway.

== See also ==
- Pindi Bhattian Tehsil
- Thatta Khero Matmal
- Hafiz Abad
