= Government High School Kot Nakka =

Govt. High School

Information
- Principal: Muhammad Mudasir
- Language: Urdu
- Qualifications: SSC
- Boards: BISE Gujranwala

The Government High School Kot Nakka is a public school offering primary and secondary education to Grade 12, in Punjab, Pakistan. It is located at the junction of Kot Nakka, Kot Nakka and Pindi Bhattian, in the Hafizabad District of Punjab Pakistan.

Initially the school was situated in a small building near the current location. Later the school moved to Pindi Bhattian prior to moving back to the current location. Students are admitted at the kindergarten (KG) level. At the eighth grade, students choose a career in Science or the Arts. Subjects include Computer, Science, Arts, Mathematics, and English. Students from the school have topped the secondary school education board.

The motto of the school is "Discipline, Faith and Unity". The day starts with prayers, the national anthem and the opening of the flag in the assembly. Recess is for refreshments and playing. The day ends around 2-4 pm. Admission is done on a merit system.

== Notes ==
- http://www.schoolinglog.com/school/Government-Boys-High-School-KOT-NAKKA-PINDI-BHATTIAN_42094.html
