= Kot Sarwar =

Coordinates: 31.92252°N 73.50484°E

- Village
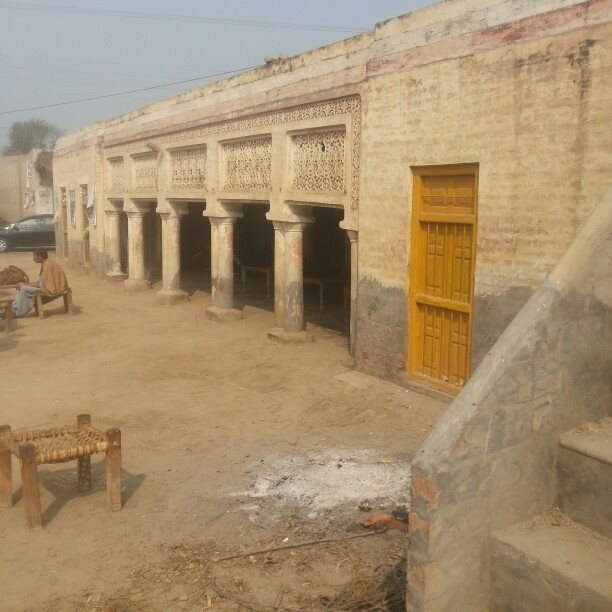
- Dera Manj Masti Bhatti in Kot Sarwar
- Interactive map of Kot Sarwar

Kot Sarwar is a village in Pindi Bhattian Tehsil, Hafizabad District of Punjab, Pakistan. The village is located near Sukheke. It has an interchange on the M-2 motorway which helps transport to connect nearby areas like Sukheke.
