= Faisalabad–Chiniot Road =

Road in Pakistan

Faisalabad–Chiniot Road فیصل آباد – چنیوٹ سڑک
- Sargodha Road

Route information
- Maintained by Punjab Highway Department
- Length: 23 km (14 mi)

Major junctions
- From: Sahianwala Interchange (M4), Faisalabad
- To: Tehseel Chowk, Chiniot

Location
- Country: Pakistan

Highway system
- Roads in Pakistan

The Faisalabad–Chiniot Road (Punjabi, Urdu: فیصل آباد – چنیوٹ سڑک), also known locally as Chiniot Road is a provincially maintained road in Punjab, Pakistan, that extends from Faisalabad to Chiniot.

== Expansion ==
The Punjab Highway Department has proposed to expand the road to 4 lanes.

== Features ==
- Length = 23 km
- Lanes = 4 lanes (Katchery Chowk to M4 motorway), 2 Lanes (M4 Motorway to Chiniot)
- Speed limit = Universal minimum speed limit of 40 km/h and a maximum speed limit of 60 km/h for heavy transport vehicles and 80 km/h for light transport vehicles
