= Kot Nakka =

- Village
- Location in Pakistan
- Coordinates: 32°54′37″N 72°56′56″E
- Country: Pakistan
- Region: Punjab Province
- District: Hafizabad District
- Time zone: UTC+5 (PST)

Kot Nakka (Urdu: کوت نکہ) is a village located in Pindi Bhattian union council of Hafizabad District in the Punjab Province of Pakistan, it is part of Pindi Bhattian Tehsil. It is a village located approximately 8 kilometres outside Pindi Bhattian, Punjab, Pakistan. It situated on the Pindi Bhattian-Sangla Hill road.

A government high school for boys and girls is also located heare.
