= Lahore–Jaranwala Road =

Road in Pakistan

Lahore-Jaranwala Road لاہور – جڑانوالہ سڑک
- Sagianwala Bypass Road

Route information
- Maintained by Punjab Highway Department
- Length: 98 km (61 mi)

Major junctions
- From: Shahdara Mor, Shahdara Bagh
- Sharaqpur; Bucheki
- To: 240 Mor, Jaranwala

Location
- Country: Pakistan

Highway system
- Roads in Pakistan

The Lahore-Jaranwala Road (Punjabi, Urdu: لاہور – جڑانوالہ سڑک), also known locally as Jaranwala Road, is a provincially maintained road in Punjab province of Pakistan. It connects Lahore and Jaranwala via Sharaqpur.

== Features ==
- Length: 98 km
- Lanes: 4 lanes
- Speed limit: Universal minimum speed limit of 80 km/h and a maximum speed limit of 100 km/h for heavy transport vehicles and 120 km/h for light transport vehicles.
