= Sheikhupura–Sharaqpur Road =

Sheikhupura District, Punjab

Sheikhupura–Sharaqpur Road شَيخُوپُورہ - شرکپور شریف سڑک

Route information
- Maintained by Punjab Highway Department
- Length: 31 km (19 mi)

Major junctions
- From: Sheikhupura
- To: Sharaqpur

Location
- Country: Pakistan

Highway system
- Roads in Pakistan

Sheikhupura–Sharaqpur Road (Punjabi, Urdu: شَيخُوپُورہ-شرکپور شریف سڑک), also known locally as Sharaqpur Road is a provincially maintained road in Punjab that extends from Sheikhupura to Sharaqpur, Sheikhupura District.

== Features ==
- Length - 31 km
- Lanes - 2 lanes

Project starting June 2021

- Speed limit - Universal minimum speed limit of 80 km/h and a maximum speed limit of 100 km/h for heavy transport vehicles and 120 km/h for light transport vehicles
