= M7 motorway =

M7 motorway may refer to:

- M7 motorway (Ireland), a motorway in Ireland
- M7 motorway (Hungary), a motorway in Hungary
- M-7 motorway (Pakistan), a motorway in Pakistan
- M7 highway (Russia), a highway in Russia, also known as the Volga Highway
- Westlink M7, a motorway in Australia
- A7 road (Great Britain), a major road in the United Kingdom, which if upgraded to motorway status, would likely be referred to as the M7 or the A7(M)
