= Sheikhupura–Hafizabad Road =

Road in Pakistan

Sheikhupura–Hafizabad Road (Jandiala Road) شَيخُوپُورہ – حافظ آباد سڑک

Route information
- Maintained by Punjab Highway Department
- Length: 50 km (31 mi)

Major junctions
- From: Sheikhupura
- Chak Shahpur; Jandiala Sher Khan; Jhabran; Keeley; Ajniawala
- To: Hafizabad

Location
- Country: Pakistan

Highway system
- Roads in Pakistan

Sheikhupura–Hafizabad Road (Punjabi, Urdu: شَيخُوپُورہ – حافظ آباد سڑک), also known locally as Jandiala Road, is a provincially maintained road in Punjab that connects the cities of Sheikhupura and Hafizabad.

== Features ==
- Length - 50 km
- Lanes - 4 lane
- Speed limit - Universal minimum speed limit of 60 km/h and a maximum speed limit of 80 km/h for heavy transport vehicles and 100 km/h for light transport vehicles.
