= Kalar Kahar Road =

Road in Punjab, Pakistan

Chakwal–Khushab Road چکوال – خُوشاب سڑک

Route information
- Maintained by Punjab Highway Department
- Length: 101 km (63 mi)

Major junctions
- From: Bhoun Chowk, Chakwal
- Bhaun; Kallar Kahar (M2); Noorpur; Padhrar; Katha Sagral
- To: Katha Chowk, Khushab

Location
- Country: Pakistan

Highway system
- Roads in Pakistan

Chakwal—Khushab Road (Urdu: چکوال—خُوشاب سڑک), also known locally as Kalar Kahar Road, is a provincially maintained road in Punjab, Pakistan that connects Chakwal and Khushab.

== Features ==
- Length: 101 km
- Lanes: 4
- Speed limit: Universal minimum speed limit of 80 km/h. The maximum speed limit is 100 km/h for heavy transport vehicles and 120 km/h for light transport vehicles.
