= Chowki Sukheki =

- Village
- Location within Pakistan
- Coordinates: 32°13′7.32″N 73°35′11.148″E
- Country: Pakistan
- Province: Punjab
- Time zone: UTC+5 (PST)

Chowki Sukheki is a village of Hafizabad District in Punjab, Pakistan. The village is located on Sargodha Road near the town of Sukheke Mandi. It has a population of approximately 4,500.

Chowki Sukheki was the home of the first person in Pakistan to die of COVID-19 during the COVID-19 pandemic.
