= Canal Bank Road =

Road in Pakistan

Canal Bank Road سڑک نہر
- Khayaban-e-Annemarrie Schimmel خیابان اینی میری شمل

Route information
- Maintained by Lahore Development Authority
- Length: 29 km (18 mi)
- Existed: 2016–present

Major junctions
- From: Multan Road, Thokar Niaz Beg
- To: Manhala Road, Khaira

Location
- Country: Pakistan

Highway system
- Roads in Pakistan

Canal Bank Road (Punjabi, Urdu: سڑک نہر, Sarak-e-Nehr) also known as Khayaban-e-Annemarie Schimmel, is a major eight-lane east–west signal-free road which extends along the banks of the Lahore Canal in Lahore, Punjab, Pakistan. The road serves as a major central artery of Lahore and extends from Multan Road in Thokar Niaz Beg to BRB Canal Road in Manhala Road, passing through the neighbourhoods of Johar, Gulberg, Mughalpura, Harbanspura and Manhala.

== Name change ==
Originally known as Canal Bank Road, in 2000, the Government of Pakistan renamed Canal Bank Road in honour of Annemarie Schimmel, for her works in Sufism and Muhammad Iqbal, a prominent philosopher and national poet of Pakistan.

== Interchanges & exits ==
There are 12 underpasses along the entire route of Canal Bank Road, which allows continuous flow of traffic from Thokar Niaz Beg to Harbanspura. The Thokar Niaz Baig Flyover allows motorists from Multan Road and the M-2 motorway to bypass Thokar Niaz Beg Chowk, which previously was a major choke point.

Interchanges	Type
Multan Road	Thokar Niaz Beg Flyover
Shahrah-e-Nazaria Pakistan	Exit (Westbound only)
Abuzar Ghaffari Road	Exit (Westbound only)
Yaseen Khan Watoo Road	Exit (Westbound only)
Abdul Haque Road	Chaudhary Rehmat Ali Underpass
Shahrak-e-Wafaqi	Exit (Westbound only)
Maulana Shaukat Ali Road	Chakar-e-Azam Rind Underpass
Khayaban-e-Jamia Punjab	Waris Mir Underpass
Chaudhary Anwar Ali Road	Exit (Eastbound only)
Masood Farooqi Road	Lal Pul Underpass
Ferozepur Road	Liaquat Ali Khan Underpass
Zahoor Elahi Road	F.C. College Underpass
Shah Jamal Road	Exit (Eastbound only)
Jail Road	Waris Shah Underpass
Mall Road	Faiz Ahmed Faiz Underpass
Sunderdas Road; Allama Iqbal Road	Hussain Shaheed Soherwordi Underpass
	Choubaca Underpass
Shalimar Road	Mughalpura Underpass
Lahore Ring Road	Jogindar Lal Mandal Underpass; Harbanspura Interchange
Jallo Park Road	Intersection
Manhala Road	T Junction

== Extension & reconstruction ==
Canal Bank Road has continuously needed widening and repaving due to its heavy use.

- Multan Road – Abdul Haque Road: Construction to widen this section began on 28 October 2011 and was completed on 15 January 2012 at cost of Rs. 166 million (US$590,000)
- Thokar Niaz Beg Flyover: Construction began on 1 December 2010 and was completed on 28 February 2011 at a cost of Rs. 315 million (US$1.1 million) by Habib Construction Services.

== See also ==
- List of streets in Lahore
- Transport in Lahore
