= Chakwal (disambiguation) =

Chakwal is a city in Punjab, Pakistan.

Chakwal may also refer to:

- Chakwal District, a district situated in Pakistan.
- Chakwal Tehsil, an administrative unit of Chakwal district.
- Chakwal railway station, a railway station in Pakistan,

== See also ==
- Chakwal-Khushab Road, a road track linking the Khushab with Chakwal.
