= Arbab Town Rajana =

Arbab Town ارباب ٹاون
- Town Service
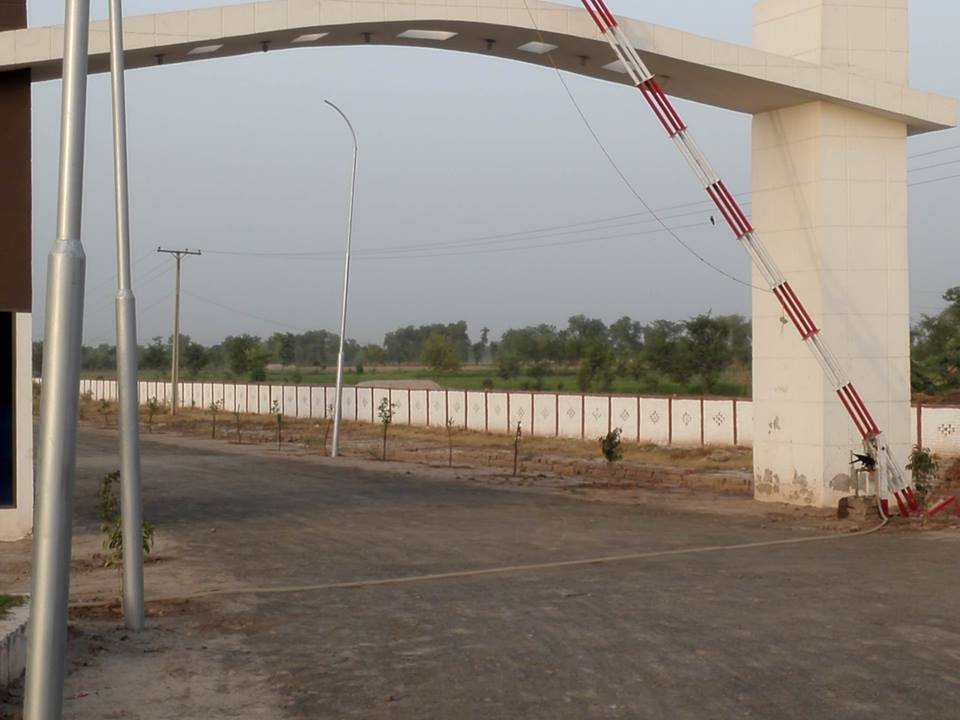

- Location in Pakistan
- Coordinates: 30°50′47.623″N 72°33′17.938″E
- Country: Pakistan
- Province: Punjab

Area
  - Total: 10 km^{2} (3.9 sq mi)

Population (2016)
  - Total: 500
  - Density: 50/km^{2} (130/sq mi)
- Time zone: UTC+5 (PST)
- Calling code: 046

Arbab Town is a town of Rajana, Punjab, Pakistan. It is 15 km away from Toba Tek Singh. It is located west of Faisalabad, east of Multan, south of Toba Tek Singh and north of Kamalia and Vehari. Arbab Town is a new territory. Many people from the villages nearby go there to buy Plats to develop their houses. The closest villages are Chak No. 285 GB, & New Interchange will be built beside the Arbab Town Rajana of Karachi Lahore Motorway.

== Gallery ==
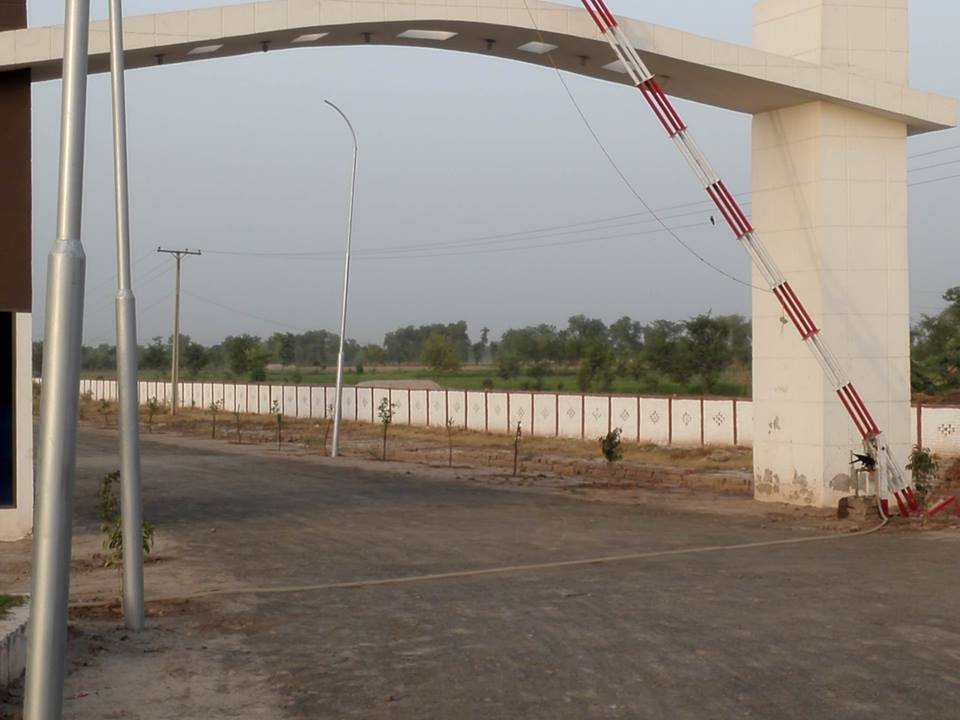
Arbab town

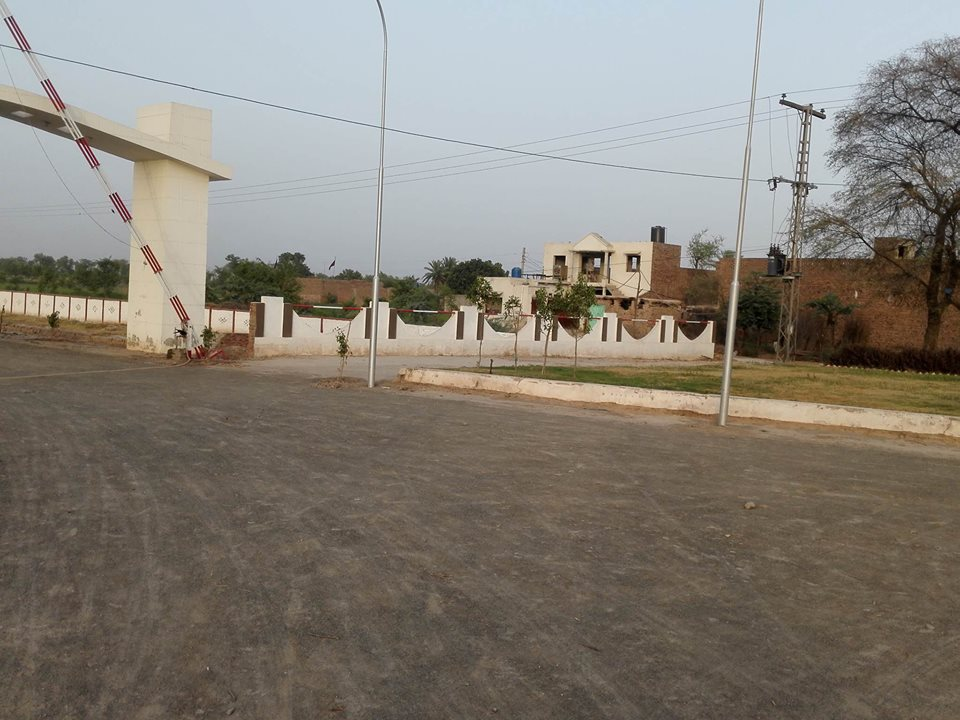
Arbab Town Front

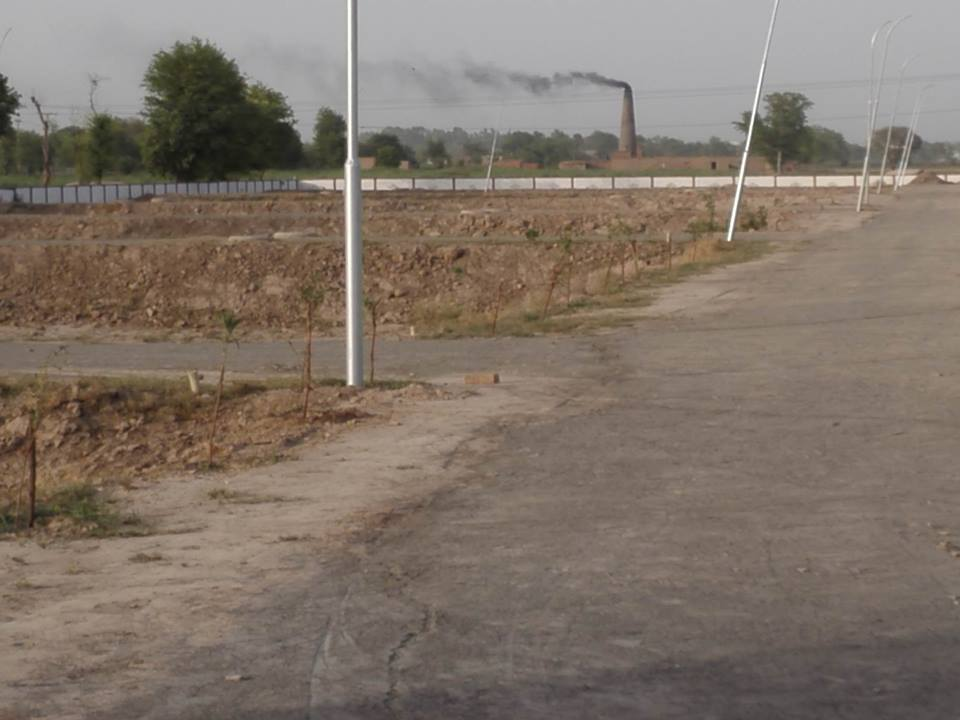
Arbab Town Plating
