= Nankana Sahib–Sangla Hill Road =

Provincially maintained road in Punjab

Nankana Sahib-Sangla Hill Road ننكانہ صاحِب – سانگلہ ہِل سڑک

Route information
- Maintained by Punjab Highway Department
- Length: 47 km (29 mi)

Major junctions
- From: Nankana Sahib; Shahkot
- To: Sangla Hill

Location
- Country: Pakistan

Highway system
- Roads in Pakistan

Nankana Sahib-Sangla Hill Road (Punjabi, Urdu: ننكانہ صاحِب – سانگلہ ہِل سڑک), also known locally as Shahkot Sangla Road is a provincially maintained road in Punjab that extends from Nankana Sahib to Sangla Hill.

Road is under-construction from Shahkot to Sangla Hill.

== Salient features ==
Length: 47 km

Lanes: 2 lanes (Nankana to Shahkot) & 4 lanes (Shahot to Sangla Hill)

Speed limit: Universal minimum speed limit of 60 km/h and a maximum speed limit of 80 km/h for heavy transport vehicles and 100 km/h for light transport vehicles.
