= Chak 285 GB =

Village in Punjab, Pakistan

Muhammadabad محمد آباد
- Village
- Chak 285 GB
- Location within Punjab, Pakistan Location within Pakistan
- Coordinates: 30°51′16″N 72°34′09″E
- Country: Pakistan
- Province: Punjab
- Division: Faisalabad
- District: Toba Tek Singh
- Tehsil: Toba Tek Singh
- Town: Rajana

Languages:
  - Official: Urdu, Punjabi, English
- Time zone: UTC+5 (PST)
- Postal Code: 36071
- Calling Code: 046

Chak 285 GB (Urdu: محمد آباد), also known as Muhammadabad, is a large village of tehsil & District Toba Tek Singh, Punjab, Pakistan. It is a part of Union Council Number 42, along with nearby villages: Chak No. 286 GB, Chak No. 284 GB. Chak No. 291 GB. Karachi–Lahore Motorway (M3) goes through this village and an interchange has been built in Rajana. All these villages are on Gugera Branch Canal, which comes from River Chennab near Khanki, Hafizabad and again joins another canal from the same river near Shorkot Cantonment. The postal code is 36071. Punjabi is the native spoken language but as a national language Urdu is also widely used. Major castes of this village are Arain, Syed, Gujjar, Rajputs, Khokhar, etc.

== Location ==
It is located near Rajana which is at the road crossing junction of Faisalabad-Pirmahal and Toba-Chichawatni, approximately 96 km south from Faisalabad and 28 km northwest of Chichawatni-Toba Take Singh Road. Just across the village boundary there is a hand-planted forest which served as wood supply for British during British raj for decades. This is one of the largest hand-planted forest in Pakistan. There is also a small zoo having different birds and animals. Its major crops are Wheat, Cotton, Sugarcane, Maize, Rice etc.

== Climate ==
It is not a typical "Hilly & Chilly" type of climate in Chak No. 285 GB, as it is closer to the plains. During winter, the climate is cold but pleasant when woollens are required. During summer the temperature is hot and cottons are recommended. Temperature does sometimes cross the 44 degree °C mark in summers.

== Education ==
The village has two schools, one for boys and one for girls, providing education up to 5th class. Nearest Government Degree College is located at Rajana. For University education of boys and girls, students have to seek admission in University at Toba Take Singh or Faisalabad. Existing schools at the village are:

- Government Primary School for Boys
- Government Primary School for Girls

== Sports ==
Cricket is the most common sports played in the village and a multipurpose Ground from Local school is dedicated for local players. Village teams regularly take part in local tournaments and derbies. Most Notable sports figures are Mohsin Javed, Mirza Afzal, Raja Ajzal, Raja Mani a.k.a. Raja Kutty Wala, Adnan Arif a.k.a. Peer Daany Ali Shah. Kabaddi, Football, Hockey, Gulli Danda and cockfighting are the other famous sports played in the village but with not much dedication as cricket. Talha Fakeer is the most prominent figure in Cockfighting.
