= Sukheke, Pakistan =

Pakistani town

Sukheke Mandi سكهيكى
- Town
- Sukheke
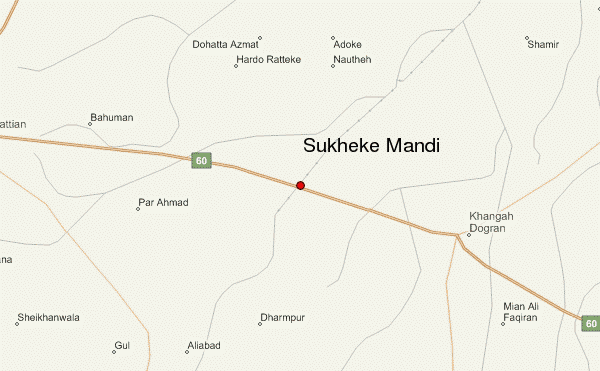

- Location of Sukheke Sukheke Mandi (Pakistan) Sukheke Mandi (South Asia) Sukheke Mandi (Asia)
- Coordinates: 31°53′N 73°28′E
- Country: Pakistan
- Region: Punjab
- Elevation: 207 m (679 ft)

Population (2023 Census)
  - City: 50,458
- Time zone: UTC+5 (PST)
  - Summer (DST): UTC+6 (PDT)
- Postal code: 52110
- Area code: 0547

Sukheke Mandi is a town near Pindi Bhattian in Hafizabad District, within Gujranwala Division of Punjab, Pakistan. It is located along the Sargodha-Lahore road and the Faisalabad-Wazirabad railway track, making it accessible by both road and rail.

Sukheke is 23 kilometres (14 mi) west of Pindi Bhattian and 30 kilometres (19 mi) from the city of Hafizabad. Primarily an agricultural town, it is known for its wheat and rice production. The town has gained easier access to the M2 motorway, being just 10 kilometres away via the Kot Sarwar Interchange. Additionally, the Rakh Branch Canal runs through the town from north to south.

The town experiences hot summers and cold winters. The eastern part tends to receive more rainfall compared to the western part, particularly during the monsoon season, which lasts from July to September. The fertile soil in the area supports rice cultivation. Average monthly rainfall ranges between 50 and 75 millimetres.

== Demographics ==
Population

Historical population
Year	Pop.	±%
1981	14,168	—
1998	28,245	+99.4%
2017	42,609	+50.9%
2023	50,458	+18.4%

According to official 2023 census results, the population of Sukheke city is 50,458.

== Schools and colleges ==
- KIPS College Sukheke Campus
- Govt High School
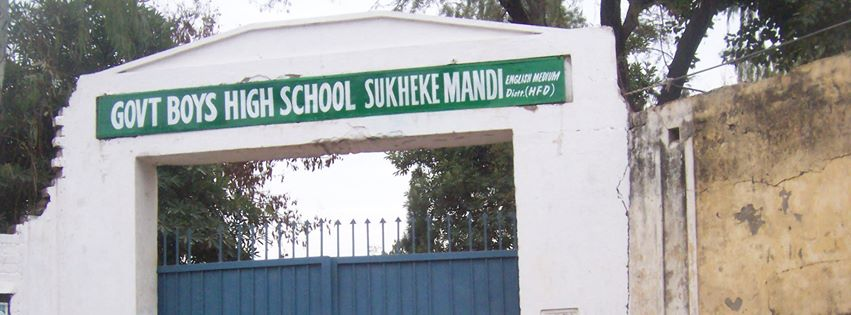
  Govt High School Sukheke Mandi
- Govt Girls Higher Secondary School
- Govt Girls Degree College, Sukheke Mandi
- Govt Rashid Minhas Secondary School
- Grammar model School, Sukheke Mandi
- Aspire College Sukheke Mandi
- Paradies School Sukheke Mandi
- Rehan Science School Sukheke Mandi
- The professional School Sukheke Mandi
