= Nautheh =

Pakistani village

Coordinates: 31.937°N 73.530°E

- Interactive map of Nautheh

Nautheh (Urdu: نوتھیں) is a village in Pindi Bhattian Tehsil, Hafizabad District, Punjab, Pakistan.

== Geography ==
Nauthen covers a 5 square mile area . Nauthen has nine sub villages areas called khooh (well): Jandwal Khooh, Rodu Khooh, Malwala Khooh, Saroo Khooh, Jinnah colony, Nauthen Station, Chuntra, Dall Wahaband Dall Jahana.

== Demographics ==
The population is 5,678. Punjabi is primary language of the area and Islam is the common religion, 97 percent Sunni and nearly 3 percent Shia Muslim. The majority of the population are Randhaira clan of Kharal caste.

== History ==
Nautha Singh and Uduo Singh were two brothers who dug two water wells which grew into two villages, Nauthen and Uduoki. Rai Jalaldin Randhira (Jalalia) a nomad leader of Kharal clan from Ravi Rihan (Lahore) in 1740 AD occupied the area around the well and drove out the old inhabitants. Rai Jalalia was survived by four sons Rai Qaim, Rai Saro (Sarwar), Rai Aqal, Rai Humaon (Humayon) and one son-in-law Ghulla Malah (a pirate) from the Pindi Bhattian Chenab river. Rai Jalalia settled in Nauthen, leaving five tribes bearing the names of his sons and son-in-law.

== Transport ==
Nauthen is linked with Hafizabad through Sukheki road and by rail to Faisalabad. Nauthen is linked with provincial capital Lahore and federal capital Islamabad through Lahore-Islamabad Motorway M2. Nauthen hosts motorway service area Sukheki.

== Education ==
Govt. High School Nauthen and Govt. Girls Middle School and Govt. Primary School Nauthen.

== Religion ==
The two main holy shrines are of Baba Haji Shah Sarkar and Bawa Nawab shah.
