= Chiraghabad =

Chiraghabad 009 Anonymous
- Town
- Rdx
- Location on M4 motorway
- Coordinates: 31°20′06″N 72°46′08″E
- Country: Pakistan
- Province: Punjab

Chiraghabad, also spelled as Chiragabad, (literally means "place of lights" Urdu: چراغ آباد) is an exurb of Faisalabad situated at the southern boundary of Faisalabad District, Pakistan. Traditionally, it was residing place for Zamindars and other natives of village number 334 which became part of Tehsil Gojra, district Toba Tek Singh in 1982. The town is provided with M4 motorway interchange.

== Population ==
Rajput tribes are in overwhelming majority in this area. Small populations of Syeds, Arains, Jatts, [Mughals]Gujjars, Kharals and Pathans also inhabit this area.

== History ==
The roadside is known as Chiraghabad. During the 18th century Chiraghabad was established by a family which migrated from Mitha Tiwana, Khushab . This prominent family of rajputs brought the land of this entire village and settled down here. The Mahl family was one of the only families to give up large holdings in Punjab to the refugees from India. Chiragabad was acquired by the wife of a British colonel from the Mahl family known as Malik Muhammad Khan Mahl Bahadur, who arrived 14 years later after fighting World War I. The main roadside of Kot Ram Chand village is named after Malik Muhammad Chiragh Khan Mahl, the patriarch of the Mahl family. This family is closely related to the Noon and Tiwana family. They have held important positions in the government of Pakistan during the governments of ZA Bhutto and Mian Nawaz Sharif.

== Notable people ==
- Rana Muhammad Akram Khan, former Chairman Executive of the Punjab Bar Council
- Malik Khalid Tawana, MPA from Gojra on the provincial assembly seat in 1970, 1977 and 1988, minister in Zulfiqar Ali Bhutto’s government, former minister and chairman NFC
- Abdul Jabbar Bhatti, Principal Staff Officer to Brig Babar Ala-ud-Din SI (M), (R), Chairperson Chief Minister’s Directorate for Monitoring and Surveillance, PSO to 8 Federal Ministers, 3 Coordinators to the Prime Minister and 3 Chairmans in Federal Government
