= M-6 motorway (Pakistan) =

Motorway in Pakistan

M-6 motorway
- ایم ٦ موٹروے
- Sukkur–Hyderabad Motorway

Route information
- Maintained by National Highway Authority
- Length: 306 km (190 mi)
- History: Ground Breaking On 13 December 2022

Major junctions
- North end: Sukkur
- South end: Hyderabad

Location
- Country: Pakistan
- Major cities: Khairpur; Mehrabpur; Naushahro Feroze; Nawabshah; Shahdadpur; Tando Adam; Matiari

Highway system
- Roads in Pakistan
← M-5	→ M-7

The M-6 Motorway (Urdu: موٹروے 6), or the Sukkur–Hyderabad Motorway, is a pending motorway project in Pakistan. It will connect Karachi port to Sukkur via Hyderabad. The 306-kilometre (190 mi) long M-6 motorway is the only missing vital link of North to South connectivity, i.e. from Karachi to Peshawar. The motorway will cost approximately $1.7 billion to build. The M-6 will be a six-lane motorway with a design speed of 120 km/h (75 mph), 89 bridges, 15 interchanges and 243 underpasses.

As M-10 motorway is being upgraded to an 8-lane motorway and will be extended to a new 134.0-kilometre (83.3 mi) long Motorway constructed through the Khirthar mountain range, connecting to the M-6 Motorway at Jamshoro.

The project is to be built as part of the larger Eastern Alignment of the China–Pakistan Economic Corridor (CPEC).

Planned time to complete this 296-kilometre (184 mi) long motorway is 29 months. China State Construction Engineering had initially won the project after bidding process in May 2017, while the ground work was anticipated to start by August 2017 and finish by December 2019. However, the project faced delays which meant that work could not start for several years. This therefore also meant original centralized framework was abandoned. The National Highway Authority (NHA) subsequently canceled the blanket contract and completely restructured the project into a decentralized Public-Private Partnership (PPP) model. To prevent foreign monopoly controls and accelerate mobilization, the 306-kilometre corridor was divided into five independent geographic sections, allowing domestic contractors and local engineering teams to take over the civil works and execution.

On 13 December 2022, Prime Minister Shehbaz Sharif formally laid the foundation stone of the project. It is planned to be completed in 30 months.

== History ==
All the other segments of 1,650-kilometre (1,030 mi) Peshawar–Karachi Motorway(PKM) have been completed except Hyderabad–Sukkur Motorway section of PKM. is 63% land acquisition has been completed. Planned time to complete this 306-kilometre (190 mi) long motorway project is 28 months.

On 16 July 2020, in an economic committee meeting presided over by PM Imran Khan's advisor on Finance and Revenue Dr. Abdul Hafeez Shaikh gave a go-ahead to the construction of the 306-kilometre-long Hyderabad–Sukkur Motor-way at a cost of Rs165.67bn .

China State Construction Engineering won the project after bidding process in May 2017 with anticipated ground work to be started by August 2017 and finish the same by December 2019. The construction contract was awarded in July 2017 however, construction is not started yet due to pending Government and NHA decision. This also meant the original centralized framework was abandoned. The National Highway Authority (NHA) subsequently canceled the blanket contract and completely restructured the project into a decentralized Public-Private Partnership (PPP) model. To prevent foreign monopoly controls and accelerate mobilization, the 306 km corridor was divided into five independent geographic sections, allowing domestic contractors and local engineering teams to take over the civil works and execution.

As of April, 2021, the Central Development Working Party (CDWP) recommended the Rs 191.47 bn, 306-kilometre (190 mi) Hyderabad–Sukkur Motorway project to the Executive Committee of the National Economic Council (Ecnec).

The construction of Hyderabad–Sukkur Motorway (M-6) will be done under public-private financing mode on the Build-Operate-Transfer (BOT) basis.

=== Land Scam ===
During the land acquisition phase of the project in June 2022, Ex Deputy Commissioner (DC) of Naushahro Feroz Tashfeen Alam Khan, Ex Deputy Commissioner of Matiari Adnan Rasheed, and Ex Assistant Commissioner of Taluka Saeedabad Tehsil Mansoor Abbasi embezzled funds deposited for the process. The three terminated civil servants withdrew Rs. 2.3 billion from the Sindh Bank account in which National Highway Authority had deposited the funds by using cheques in their names. Abbasi and Rasheed were arrested on 18 November 2022, while Tashfeen Alam fled to Azerbaijan the same day. Pakistan government is seeking an Interpol red warrant for his arrest and extradition. Three Sindh Bank officials, including Area Manager, Tabish Shah, have also been arrested by Federal Investigation Agency in the case. Of the amount withdrawn, only Rs. 556 million was actually disbursed to landowners with Rs. 446 million recovered from Rasheed, which leaves Rs. 1.32 billion still unaccounted for.

== Route ==
At its southern terminus, the M-6 motorway will connect to the M-9 motorway at Jamshoro for onward connections to Karachi. The route will then course towards the northeast, and connect to the N-55 Indus Highway via an interchange. It will continue to course towards the northeast to connect to the city of Hyderabad, via an intersection with the N-5 National Highway. From there, the road will course towards the north towards the cities of Matiari, Tando Adam, Shahdadpur, and Nawabshah in central Sindh. It will then continue northwards towards Khairpur, and finally course northeast again towards the city of Rohri, which lies across the Indus River from Sukkur in northern Sindh province. From Rohri, a controlled-access motorway will continue onwards towards Multan and Islamabad.

== Financing ==
Construction of the motorway is to cost an estimated $1.7 billion. While the government of China has extended low interest concessionary loans to cover large portions of CPEC infrastructure projects, the government of Pakistan in July 2016 decided to allow international bidding for the project, citing difficulty meeting Pakistan's required financial contributions for utilization of concessionary Chinese loans. Chinese and South Korean companies have reportedly shown early interest in the project.

As of April, 2021, the Central Development Working Party (CDWP) recommended the Rs 191.47 bn, 306-kilometre (190 mi) Hyderabad–Sukkur Motorway project to the Executive Committee of the National Economic Council (Ecnec).

The construction of Hyderabad–Sukkur Motorway (M-6) will be done under public-private financing mode on the Build-Operate-Transfer (BOT) basis.

== Construction ==
As of April, 2021 The federal government deferred approval of Rs192 billion worth of Hyderabad–Sukkur motorway project due to proposed changes in its financing model, which now seeks Rs76 billion from the budget compared to the original plan of constructing the road with private sector funding.

The Central Development Working Party (CDWP), which has a mandate to approve public sector projects, referred back the scheme to the Public Private Partnership (PPP) Authority for vetting the budget demand of Rs76 billion.

As of April, 2021, the Central Development Working Party (CDWP) recommended the Rs 191.47 billion, 306-kilometre (190 mi) Hyderabad–Sukkur Motorway project to the Executive Committee of the National Economic Council (Ecnec). The project would be included in the 2021 federal budget. It is to be implemented on the BOT user-charge basis with the provision of significantly higher financial contribution by the federal government through a capital and operational viability gap fund (VGF) to improve the financial viability of the project. The project is expected to be completed in 30 months

The construction of Hyderabad–Sukkur Motorway (M-6) will be done under public-private financing mode on the Build-Operate-Transfer (BOT) basis. The Executive Committee of the National Economic Council (Ecnec) on 26 May 2021 approved 10 development projects, including the Hyderabad–Sukkur Motorway.

National Highway Authority (NHA) on Friday (4 February 2022) issued a final evaluation report regarding the proposals submitted by interested bidders and declared Techno-consortium as the most advantageous bidder.

The groundbreaking ceremony of the project was held on 13 December 2022. The construction work was expected to take 30 months.

== Interchanges ==
Hyderabad Sukkur Motorway
Interchange	Junction	Location
Rohri Sukkur		Sukkur
Khairpur		N-5
Larkana Rd		Khairpur
Gadeji		N-5
Mehrabpur		Mehrabpur Rd
Bhiria Rd		Bhiria Rd
Daur		Moro Rd
Nawabshah		Sakrand Rd
Shahdadpur		Hala Rd
Tando Adam		Bhit Shah Rd
Odero Lal		Khyber Rd
Mitiari		Tando Allah Yar Rd
Hyderabad		N-5
Sehwan Rd		N-55
Jamshoro		Hyderabad
