= Thatha Khairo Matmal =

Pakistani town

Thatha Khairo Matmal ٹھٹھہ خیرومٹمل
- Village

Thatha Khairo Matmal is a village situated along the Lahore-Sargodha road, in Punjab, Pakistan. It is just 6 km from Pindi Bhattian city, it falls within the Pindi Bhattian Tehsil of Hafizabad District.

== People ==
- Saira Afzal Tarar (from NA-102 Hafizabad-I constituency), Member of National Assembly of Pakistan (2013 - 2018)
