= M-5 motorway (Pakistan) =

Motorway in Pakistan

M-5 motorway
- ایم ٥ موٹروے
- Multan–Sukkur Motorway

Route information
- Maintained by National Highway Authority
- Length: 392 km (244 mi)
- Existed: 2018; 8 years ago–present

Major junctions
- North end: Multan
- South end: Sukkur

Location
- Country: Pakistan
- Major cities: Shujabad; Jalalpur Pirwala; Bahawalpur; Rahim Yar Khan; Sadiqabad; Ghotki; Pano Aqil; Rohri

Highway system
- Roads in Pakistan
← M-4	→ M-6

The M-5 Motorway (Urdu: ایم ٥ موٹروے), or the Multan–Sukkur Motorway (Urdu: ملتان سکھر موٹروے), is a north–south motorway in Pakistan, which connects Multan and Sukkur. The M-5 is a 392 km long, high-speed (120 km/h), controlled-access, six-lane motorway that forms part of the China-Pakistan Economic Corridor. It is currently the longest motorway in Pakistan. It is one of the longest parts of the Lahore-Karachi Motorway (LKR).

== History ==
The approval for the Multan-Sukkur Motorway (M-5) was granted in July 2014, with an estimated cost of Rs. 200 billion (equivalent to US$2.64 billion in 2025). In May 2016, the Pakistani government awarded the contract to build this section to China State Construction Engineering, with the completion date being August 2019. Former Prime Minister Nawaz Sharif performed the groundbreaking on 6 May 2016, while the actual ground work started in August 2016.

The M-5 motorway project forms a cornerstone of the much-larger China–Pakistan Economic Corridor. Construction covered 21 Chinese residential camps and 23 Pakistani workers camps with hundreds of working sites, directly providing jobs to nearly 30,000 Pakistanis at peak time. The motorway was inaugurated on 5 November 2019 in the 9th Joint Cooperation Committee (JCC) meeting in Islamabad.

== Cost and financing ==
The total cost of the motorway was estimated to be around $2.89 billion. The Multan–Sukkur Motorway (M-5) cost approximately $2.94 billion, with the bulk of financing financed by various Chinese state-owned banks. 90% of the project's cost was financed through concessionary loans on interest rates of 1.6% from China, while the remaining balance is financed by government of Pakistan.

== Route ==
Starting from Multan, the six-lane motorway passes through Shujabad, Jalalpur Pirwala, Ahmedpur East, Rahimyar Khan, Sadiqabad, Ubauro, and Pano Aqil before it terminates at Sukkur. The project consists of 54 bridges, including one major bridge on the river Sutlej. The motorway has 12 service areas, 10 rest areas, 11 interchanges, 10 flyovers, and 426 underpasses.

== Interchanges ==
M-5 Motorway Junctions
Interchange	Junction	South-bound exits
Shershah Interchange		Start of motorway
Shershah Interchange		Bahawalpur Road
Shujaabad Interchange		Lodhran Road
Jalalpur Pirwala Interchange		Lodhran Road
Jhangra Interchange		Bahawalpur-DHA N-5
Uch Sharif Interchange		Alipur Rd
Tarinda		Tarinda Muhammad Panah Road
Zahir Pir Interchange		Chachran Sharif Road
Rahim Yar Khan Toll Plaza		Rahim Yar Khan N-5
Guddu Interchange		Sadiqabad Kashmore Road
Ghotki Interchange		JDW Unit 3 Sugar Mill Road
Pano Aqil Interchange		Local Road
Sukkur Interchange		Rohri/Sukkur (N-5) Hyderabad (M-6) Road continues as M-6 to Hyderabad
