= Lahore Ring Road =

Highway in Lahore, Pakistan

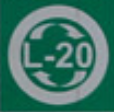
Lahore Ring Road لاہور رنگ روڈ

Route information
- Maintained by Punjab Highway Department
- Length: 85 km (53 mi)
- Existed: 2009–present

Major junctions
- Orbital around Lahore
- From: Babu Sabu Interchange
- LSM Bypass Interchange
- To: Maraka Interchange

Location
- Country: Pakistan

Highway system
- Roads in Pakistan

The Lahore Ring Road (Urdu: لاہور رنگ روڈ) is an 85-kilometer-long (53 mi) controlled-access, orbital highway located in Lahore, Pakistan. It links to the M-2 and M-11 motorways, and the N-5 National Highway while going around the city of Lahore.

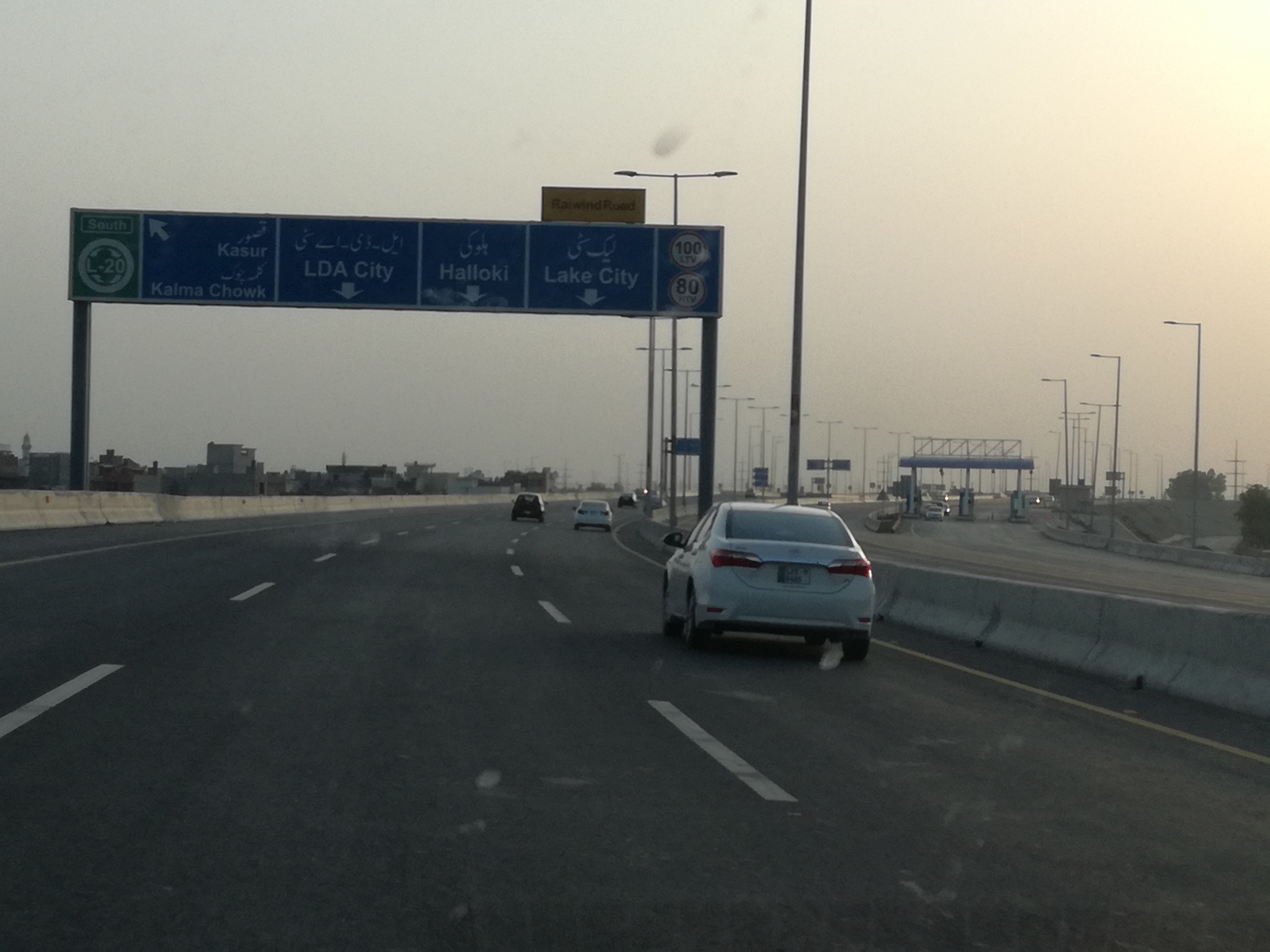
Lahore Ring Road L-20

== Route ==
Northern Loop: Length 40 Km.

Southern Loop: Length 30.4 Km Operational, SL-4 section is beginning to plan construction.

- SL-1: Length 9.35 Km
- SL-2: Length 13.05 Km
- SL-3: Length 8 Km
- SL-4: Being Planned

The road encircles Lahore. Its route is from Babu Sabu to Saggian Interchange, Lahore, Niazi Chowk. From there it runs to Mehmood Booti, passing through GT road, Canal Bank Road, Harbanspura Interchange, Barki Road, Abdullah Gul Interchange, Allama Iqbal International Airport, Ghazi Road, DHA Phase V & VII, Sui Gas Society, Ferozepur Road, to Hudiara Drain (South) to Halloki, to Maraka.

An emergency lane is present on both sides of the road. It is estimated that 425,000 vehicles pass through daily. All linking roads with Lahore Ring Road were to be improved and widened. As many as 20 interchanges were to be erected.

== Features ==
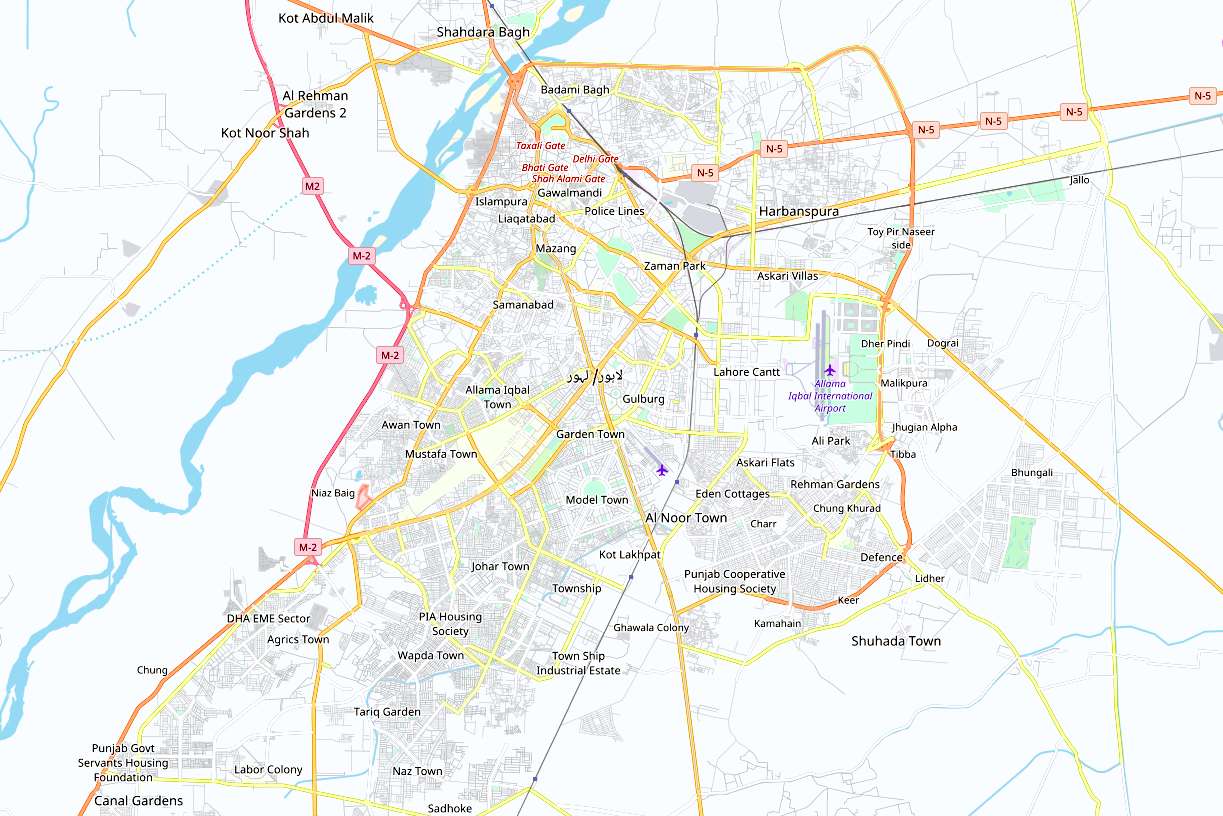
Map of Lahore showing major roads

The project includes the construction of a six-lane divided carriageway, interchanges, RCC bridges, reinforced earth abutments/walls, overhead pedestrian bridges, culverts, sub-ways, underpasses, flyovers and related works.

Length: 85 km

Lanes: 6

Speed limit: minimum speed is 80 km/h, maximum speed is 100 km/h for heavy transport vehicles and 120 km/h for light transport vehicles

Separation: central raised concrete median and grade-separated junctions.

Access: restricted to fast-moving vehicles only, including high-performance heavy bikes. The road is fenced on either side. Pedestrians, bicycles, low-performance motorcycles, animal-driven carriages, and other slow-moving vehicles are not permitted.

== History ==
The project was conceived in 1992. The six-lane road (177 kilometres) was estimated to cost Rs 117 billion. The eventual ring road, with six lanes stretching out to 443 km, comes at the cost of Rs 185 billion while the same road with 177 km will cost approximately Rs 1150 billion. Changes in government caused delays and changes in the project and the total cost estimates shot up due to increased land acquisition, improvement of existing roads used in the project, shifting of utility installations, protecting commercial and residential areas and improvements to junctions.

Explanations for the overrun included delays from lack of professional capabilities, loose checks and balances and the absence of third-party oversight. Contracts were awarded to handpicked contractors without first acquiring the land. The project was the largest development scheme in the history of the metropolis. Usually, land is acquired by LDA land acquisition collector, and EDO revenue, but in this project the Board of Revenue was exclusively involved in acquiring the land.

Studies were carried out on the road over this period. The road was designed and redesigned, considering the political and economic interests of the ruling party. In 1991, the Japan International Cooperation Agency proposed a road-loop in the city and the World Bank prepared a feasibility report on a 60 km ring road. In 1995, the Lahore Development Authority presented its scheme. At that time, Daewoo and other foreign companies had signed a memorandum of understanding with the LDA.

In 2003, President Pervez Musharraf directed the Punjab government to implement the project. The project was launched on 22 December 2004 at a ground-breaking ceremony attended by President Musharaf.

The Punjab Communication & Works Department Project Management Unit awarded the “Lahore Ring Road Southern Loop Feasibility Study and Selection of Route” to NESPAK in December 2007. This project was awarded to National Logistics Cell in February 2009, which subcontracted the first phase (Package 4, Saggian Interchange) to Habib Construction Services.\ HCS completed this phase in May 2009. The scope of work included a route alignment study, traffic study, environmental impact assessment, project cost estimates, as well as an economic and financial evaluation. The work on the Southern Loop was to start in 2010, but funding problems delayed matters. The start date was pushed 2011. As of 2010 30% of the work on the first phase of the road, from Niazi Chowk to Bund Road, (43 kilometres) was nearing completion. Work on the Southern Loop was also delayed until 2011 and then until 2016. The Kamahan to Adda segment was inaugurated on 22 December 2017.

The southern Loop hosts housing societies that will be linked, such as DHA, Sui Gas Housing Society, Eden Park (adjacent to Lahore Wildlife Park), State Life Housing Society, Eden Gardens, Valencia, Khayaban-e-Amin, Lake City, AWT Scheme, Fazaia Housing Scheme and Bahria Town.

== Bahria Town controversy ==
Construction on the final, 8 km (5.0 mi) loop of the orbital highway, SL-III, that begins from Adda Plot near Raiwind to Maraka on GT Road, was delayed since 2016 due to litigation by Bahria Town Lahore. The housing society's administration took stay orders from Lahore High Court and termed the construction of the road illegal as it passed through under-construction areas of the society. The stay order was later vacated and the society purchased back 600 plots and 300 houses that lay in the Ring Road's path.

Finally, in the 3rd quarter of 2023 the construction work started at multiple spots & directions for time saving which is in progress on 24 x 7 basis. Total cost of the project is estimated at Rs. 17.77 billion of which Rs. 6 billion were issued in August 2023 by the Provincial Govt. Besides the speedy and extensive work, date of completion is not yet known.

== Lahore Ring Road Authority ==
The Lahore Ring Road Authority is an autonomous body under the Communications and Works Department, Government of Punjab. The authority was established in 2011 under Lahore Ring Road Authority Act 2011, to overview the construction, operation and maintenance of the Ring Road.

== See also ==
- Indus Highway
- Karakoram Highway
- Makran Coastal Highway
- National highways of Pakistan
- Transport in Pakistan
- Transport in Lahore
