= M-4 motorway (Pakistan) =

Motorway in Punjab, Pakistan

M-4 motorway
- ایم ٤ موٹروے
- موٹروے 4 Pindi Bhattian-Faisalabad-Multan Motorway

Route information
- Maintained by National Highway Authority
- Length: 309 km (192 mi)
- Existed: 2019; 7 years ago–present
- History: 2003

Major junctions
- North end: Pindi Bhattian
- Abdul Hakeem
- South end: Multan

Location
- Country: Pakistan
- Major cities: Faisalabad; Gojra; Toba Tek Singh; Jhang; Abdul Hakeem; Khanewal; Multan

Highway system
- Roads in Pakistan
← M-3	→ M-5

The M-4 Motorway (Urdu: موٹروے 4) or the Pindi Bhattian–Multan Motorway is a north–south motorway in Pakistan that connects the cities of Faisalabad and Multan. The 309 km motorway also connects to the M2, M3 and M5 motorways. It was originally called the Faisalabad–Khanewal Expressway (E4).

== History ==
The M4 Motorway was planned as part of Pakistan's Motorway Network from Faisalabad to Multan. The ground-breaking ceremony of the project was carried out by then president of Pakistan Parvez Musharraf in 2007. At that time already constructed motorway from Faisalabad to Pindi Bhattian was named as M3 Motorway, sometimes it was referred to as shortest motorway of Pakistan. However, in 2013, when Mian Muhammad Nawaz Sharif became Prime Minister of Pakistan, another motorway from Lahore to Darkhana (Abdul Hakeem) was planned under CPEC to provide an alternate route for traffic coming to & from Lahore, bounded for Multan & subsequently up till Karachi so as to avoid/ reduce congestion over already existing N-5. This new motorway was designated as M3 Motorway (Lahore Abdul Hakeem Motorway) & the previously named M3 Motorway (Pindi Bhattian to Faisalabad) was merged with Faisalabad Multan Motorway & the entire stretch from Pindi Bhattian to Multan was named as M4 Motorway (Pindi Bhattian- Faisalabad- Multan Motorway).

== Inauguration ==
The M4 Motorway (Faisalabad to Multan section) was inaugurated in parts, first being Faisalabad to Gojra, second was Multan to Khanewal (Shamkot), third being Gojra to Shorkot, fourth was Shorkot to Abdul Hakeem ( Shorkot to Abdul Hakeem became operational almost together with Lahore Abdul Hakeem (Darkhana) Motorway) & finally Abdul Hakim (Deen Pur) to Khanewal (Shamkot). The last section of M4 Motorway (Abdul Hakeem to Khanewal) was inaugurated by the Foreign Minister of Pakistan Makhdoom Shah Mahmood Qureshi. The M4 Motorway was completed successfully by the end of 2019.

Pindi Bahttian to Faisalabad section of M4 Motorway was inaugurated in Year 2003.

== Route ==
The M4 begins near the M2 Pindi Bhattian Interchange and continues on a southwest course connecting the cities of Faisalabad, Gojra, Toba Tek Singh, Shorkot, Abdul Hakeem, from Abdul Hakim to Mian Channu via Tulamba city for Vehari, Burewala, Sahiwal cities. It's shortest way for traveller's M4 road is under construction and almost 70 percent completed Khanewal and Multan. And ends at Sher Shah Interachange giving exit to Multan Cantt over Shujabaad Road & itself continues as M5 Multan-Sukkur Motorway. It is connected to M3 Motorway (Lahore to Abdul Hakeem Motorway) near a village named Darkhana a few kilometers northeast of Abdul Hakeem Interchange. There is a separate Toll Plaza for Entrance/ Exit to/ from M3 Motorway.

Throughout its route, it passes mainly through the Agricultural Lands of Central Punjab.

=== Railway Line ===
M4 route is almost parallel to Railway Line till Faisalabad i.e. from Multan to Khanewal. The railway line runs along the left side of Motorway with an overhead bridge of Motorway for Railway crossing near Shamkot village. Then onwards, the Railway Line runs parallel to the right of motorway till Faisalabad, although the railway line might not be clearly visible from this motorway.

=== River Ravi ===
M4 Motorway crosses River Ravi in between Abdul Hakeem Interchange & Darkhana (M4, M3 Junction) Interchange.It is also connected with Tulamba city and mian Channu city

== Junctions and interchanges ==
M4 Motorway Junctions
Interchange	Junction	Location
M-2 –		Pindi Bhatian
Sangla Hill		Beranwala Road
Sahianwala		Chiniot Road
Deputy Wala		Millat Road
Kamalpur		Sargodha Road
Aminpur		Narwala Road
Painsra / Jhang		Chiraghabad, Jhang Road
Gojra / Jhang		Gojra, Jhang Road
Toba Tek Singh / Jhang		Jhang saddarRoad
Waryam Wala Road		Toba Jhang Road
Shorkot		Cantt/Garh Maharaja Road
M-3 –		Towards Pir Mahal & Lahore
Abdul Hakeem		Pul Bagar Road
Makhdoom Pur Pahoran		Kabirwala Road
Kabirwala		Khanewal Road
Shamkot (Khanewal)		N-5
Shah Rukn-e-Alam (Multan)		Vehari Road
Shah Shams Tabrez (Multan)		N-5
Shershah M-5 –		Multan
