= Provincial highways of Punjab =

Public roads in Punjab, Pakistan

The Provincial Highways of Punjab are all public highways maintained by the Punjab Highway Department in the Pakistani province of Punjab. The highway department under the Department of Transportation maintains over 38,000 kilometres (24,000 mi) of roadways organised into various classifications which crisscross the province and provide access to major population centres. These are not to be confused with national highways which are federal roads maintained by the Government of Pakistan and the National Highway Authority.

== List of controlled access highways ==
- Lahore Ring Road

== List of provincial highways ==
Provincial Highways of Punjab
Highway	Course	Length	Exists	Status	Lanes	Notes
Chakwal Khushab Road	Chakwal – Khushab	104 km	104 km	via	2	
Sargodha-Gujrat Road	Sargodha – Gujrat	170 km	170 km	via Bhalwal, Mandi Bahauddin, Phalia	4	
Faisalabad–Chiniot Road	Faisalabad – Chiniot	23 km	23 km	via	4	
Faisalabad–Sheikhupura Road	Faisalabad – Sheikhupura	123 km	123 km	via Shahkot	4	
Faisalabad-Sangla Hill Road	Faisalabad – Sangla Hill	50 km	50 km	via	2	
Faisalabad-Samundri Road	Faisalabad – Samundri	43 km	43 km	via	4	
Chhamb–Gujrat Road	Chhamb – Gujrat	50 km	50 km	via Tanda, Jalalpure Jattan	2	
Jhang–Chiniot Road	Jhang – Chiniot	81 km	81 km	via	2	
Lahore–Kasur Road (Ferozepur Road)	Lahore – Kasur	66 km	66 km	via	4	
Mandra Chakwal Road	Mandra – Chakwal	63 km	63 km	via	4	
Nankana Sahib-Sangla Hill Road	Nankana Sahib – Sangla Hill	47 km	47 km	via	2	
Sheikhupura–Hafizabad Road	Sheikhupura – Hafizabad	50 km	50 km	via	2	
Sheikhupura–Sharaqpur Road	Sheikhupura – Sharaqpur	31 km	31 km	via	2	
Sohawa Chakwal Road	Sohawa – Chakwal	70 km	70 km	via	4	
Talagang-Chakwal Road	Talagang – Chakwal	45 km	45 km	via	2	
Bhalwal–Shahpur Road	Bhalwal – Shahpur	50 km	50 km	via	4	
Talagang–Mianwali Road	Talagang – Mianwali	101 km	101 km	via	2	
Talagang–Fateh Jang Road	Talagang – Fateh Jang	85 km	85 km	via	2	
In total		9388 km	9388 km			

- Bahawalnagar–Bhukan Road
- Bahawalnagar–Bhawalpure Road
- Bahawalnagar–Haroonabad Road
- Badiana–Shakargarh Road
- Lahore–Raiwind Road (Raiwind Road)
- Lahore–Wagah G.T Road
- Lahore–Barki Road
- Lahore-Manhala Road
- Raiwind–Pattoki Road
- Shahdara Lahore–Narang Mandi Road
- Sheikhupura–Muridke Road
- Muridke–Narowal Road
- Kamoke–Eimanabad–Sialkot Road
- Kamoke–Qila Dildar Singh–Alipur Chatha Road
- Gujranwala–Pasrur Road
- Gujranwala–Hafizabad Road
- Gujranwala–Alipur Chatha Road
- Gujranwala–Farooqabad Road
- Gujranwala–Sheikhupura Road
- Gujranwala–Daska–Sialkot Road
- Wazirabad–Sialkot Road
- Wazirabad–Daska Road
- Wazirabad–Pindi Bhattian Road
- Daska–Sambrial Road
- Daska–Pasrur Road
- Girot–Adhikot–Kalor Kot Road
- Narowal–Shakargarh Road
- Dinga–Mandi Bahauddin Road
- Gujrat–Bhimber Road
- Kharian–Dinga–Mandi Bahauddin Road
- Kharian–Jalalpure Jattan Road
- Mandi Bahauddin–Sarai Alamgir Road
- Kasur–Raiwind–Manga Mandi Road
- Kasur–Depalpur Road
- Kasur Bypass
- Pindi Bhattian–Chiniot–Jhang Road
- Sargodha-Jhang Road
- Jhang–Shorkot–Kabirwala Road
- Jhang–Toba Tek Singh–Chichawatni Road
- Shorkot City–Shorkot Cantonment Road
- Mian Channu–Talamba Road
- Mandi–Malakwal–Bhera Road
- Phallia–Bherowal-Sial Morr Road
- Sialkot–Pasrur Road
- Sialkot–Zafarwal Road
- Haroonabad–Chistian Road
- Haroonabad–Fortabas Road
- Lahore–Sahiwal Road
- Layyah–Bhakkar Road
- Layyah–Kot Addu Road
- Layyah–Chowk Azam-Chaubara-Garh Maharaja Road

== See also ==
- Motorways of Pakistan
- Punjab Highway Patrol
- National Highways of Pakistan
- Transport in Pakistan
- National Highway Authority
