= Lahore–Kasur Road =

Road in Punjab, Pakistan

Lahore–Kasur Road Ferozepur Road لاہور– قصور سڑک

Route information
- Maintained by Punjab Highway Department
- Length: 66 km (41 mi)

Major junctions
- From: Mozang Chungi, Lahore
- To: Ganda Singh Wala, Kasur

Location
- Country: Pakistan

Highway system
- Roads in Pakistan

Lahore–Kasur Road (Punjabi: لہور–قصور سڑک; Urdu: لاہور–قصور سڑک), also known as Ferozepur Road, is a provincially maintained road in Punjab, Pakistan that extends from Lahore to Kasur. Within Lahore (from Mozang Chungi to Gajju Matta), it is referred to as Ferozepur Road, since it initially connected Lahore and Ferozpur (now in Punjab, India).
