= Harbanspura =

Neighborhood in Lahore, Punjab, Pakistan

Harbanspura ہربنس پُورا
- Neighbourhood
- Country: Pakistan
- Province: Punjab
- City: Lahore
- Tehsil: Shalimar

Harbanspura (Punjabi, Urdu: ہربنس پُورا) is a neighbourhood of Lahore in Punjab, Pakistan. It is located on the Lahore canal bank. It was a jagir of Raja Harbans Singh. After his death, his widow, Rani Chawnia became the owner of the estate. At the Partition of India, the estate was declared state land as evacuee property and its tenants got control of it.

== See also ==
- Harbanspura Interchange
