= Green Town =

Neighborhood in Lahore, Pakistan

Green Town گرِین ٹاؤن
- Neighbourhood
- Interactive map of Green Town گرِین ٹاؤن
- Coordinates: 31°26′03″N 74°18′25″E
- Country: Pakistan
- Province: Punjab
- City: Lahore
- Tehsil: Model Town

Green Town (Punjabi, Urdu: گرِین ٹاؤن) is a neighbourhood in Model Town Tehsil of Lahore in Punjab, Pakistan.
