= M-7 motorway (Pakistan) =

Planned road in Pakistan

M7 Motorway
- ایم ٧ موٹروے

Route information
- Length: 540 km (340 mi)

Major junctions
- North end: Dadu
- Ratodero, Larkana
- South end: Hub

Location
- Country: Pakistan
- Regions: Sindh, Balochistan
- Major cities: Dadu, Larkana, Hub

Highway system
- Roads in Pakistan

The M-7 or the Dadu–Hub Motorway is a planned motorway between Dadu and Hub. The highway is part of the north–south route from Islamabad to Karachi and forms the southernmost part of this route from Ratodero to Karachi in about 540 kilometres (340 mi).

== Alignment ==
At the town of Ratodero (near Sukkur) the M5 from Multan has to merge into the M7, while crossing the M8, the highway to Gwadar at the border with Iran. The M7 then runs south along the Indus River and serves several cities, of which Larkana is the most important. However, this last route must pass through the Kirthar Range, a low mountain range.
