= Mozang =

Neighborhood in Lahore, Punjab, Pakistan

Coordinates: 31°32′55″N 74°18′54″E

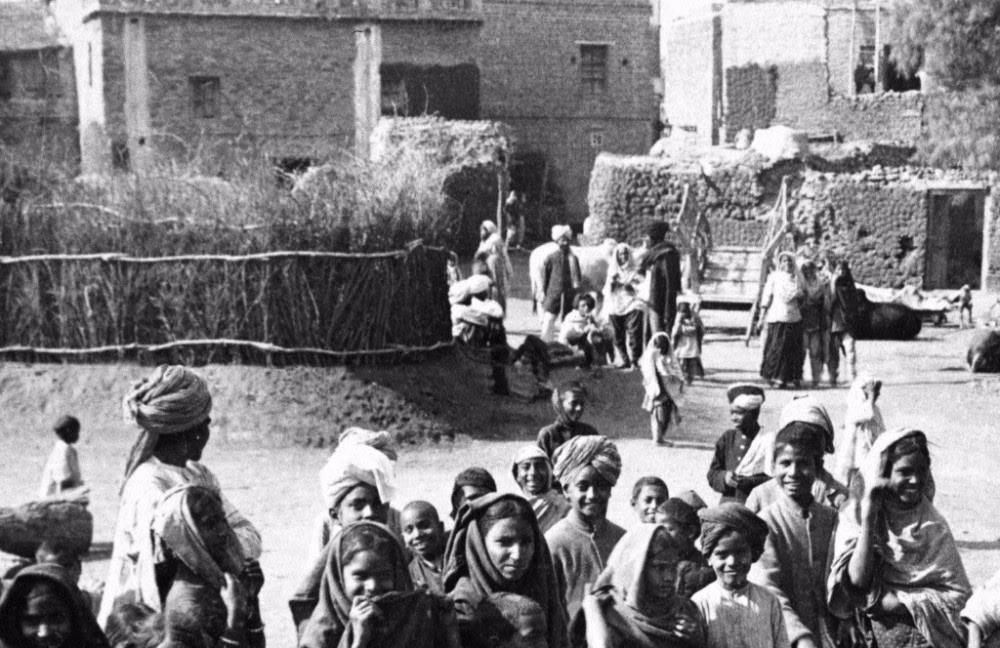
Children at Mozang, 1912

Mozang (Punjabi, Urdu: مزَنگ) is an area in Lahore City Tehsil of Lahore in Punjab, Pakistan. Nearby areas are Miani Sahib Graveyard, Jail Road, Choubarji, Shama and the Anarkali Bazaar. It is located at 31°32'55N 74°18'54E. The January 2011 Raymond Davis incident took place here.
