= M-2 motorway (Pakistan) =

Motorway in Pakistan

M-2 motorway
- ایم ٢ موٹروے
- لاہور-اسلام آباد موٹروے

Route information
- Part of AH1 AH4
- Maintained by National Highway Authority
- Length: 375 km (233 mi)
- Existed: 1997–present

Major junctions
- North end: Islamabad
- M-4 Motorway Interchange; M-3 Motorway Interchange; Babu Sabu Interchange via Lahore Northern Bypass: Kala Shah Kaku Interchange Kala Shah Kaku Interchange
- South end: Thokar Niaz Baig, Lahore

Location
- Country: Pakistan
- Major cities: Chakwal; Mandi Bahauddin; Kallar Kahar; Bhalwal; Pindi Bhattian; Sheikhupura; Kot Abdul Malik

Highway system
- Roads in Pakistan
← M-1	→ M-3

The M-2 Motorway or the Lahore–Islamabad Motorway (Urdu: لاہور-اسلام آباد موٹروے) is a north–south motorway in Pakistan, connecting Rawalpindi/Islamabad to Lahore, and is the first motorway to have been built in South Asia. The M-2 is 375 kilometres (233 mi) long and located entirely in Punjab. It continues on to eventually become the M-1 motorway, connecting Islamabad and Peshawar. The M-2 crosses the junction of M-4 (to Faisalabad) at Pindi Bhattian and M-3 (to Multan) at Dera Saithan Wala. The motorway is also a part of the Asian Highway AH1. The motorway was constructed during Prime Minister Nawaz Sharif's rule and cost over Rs. 60 billion (equivalent to US$2.9 billion in 2025) and was opened in November 1997. One of the most expensive motorways in Asia, it also has one of the highest pillared-bridges in Asia at the Khewra Salt Range section.

There are ten service and rest areas on both sides of the motorway, with fueling, car wash, and car-repair facilities, and fast-food restaurants such as KFC, McDonald's, and Gloria Jean's Coffees, among others.

In 2016, the entire motorway was resurfaced—work that stretched over several months. New toll plazas were installed on every interchange. They are payable with a new M-tag system that was introduced in December 2021.

== History ==
The M-2 was conceived by Prime Minister Nawaz Sharif in his first term (1990–1993). The contract was awarded to Daewoo Group of South Korea on 30 December 1991 at a cost of Rs. 23,686 billion on a design-cum-construct basis. The original contract was for a four-lane facility.

Daewoo provided a loan of $379 million as supplier's credit, covering 40% of the construction cost. The loaned amount would eventually grow to $702 million. The other 60% of the cost would be paid by the government.

The motorway was inaugurated on November 26, 1997, during Sharif's second term. In late 2006, upgrades were made to the portion of the M-2 passing through the Salt Range due to increasing complaints of drivers. The upgrades included better marking of the road lines and increased size of road signs for easy visibility. Between 2014-2016, the M-2 motorway was resurfaced, rengineered and reconstructed for a smooth and safer drive by the FWO (Frontier Works Organisation).

== Route ==
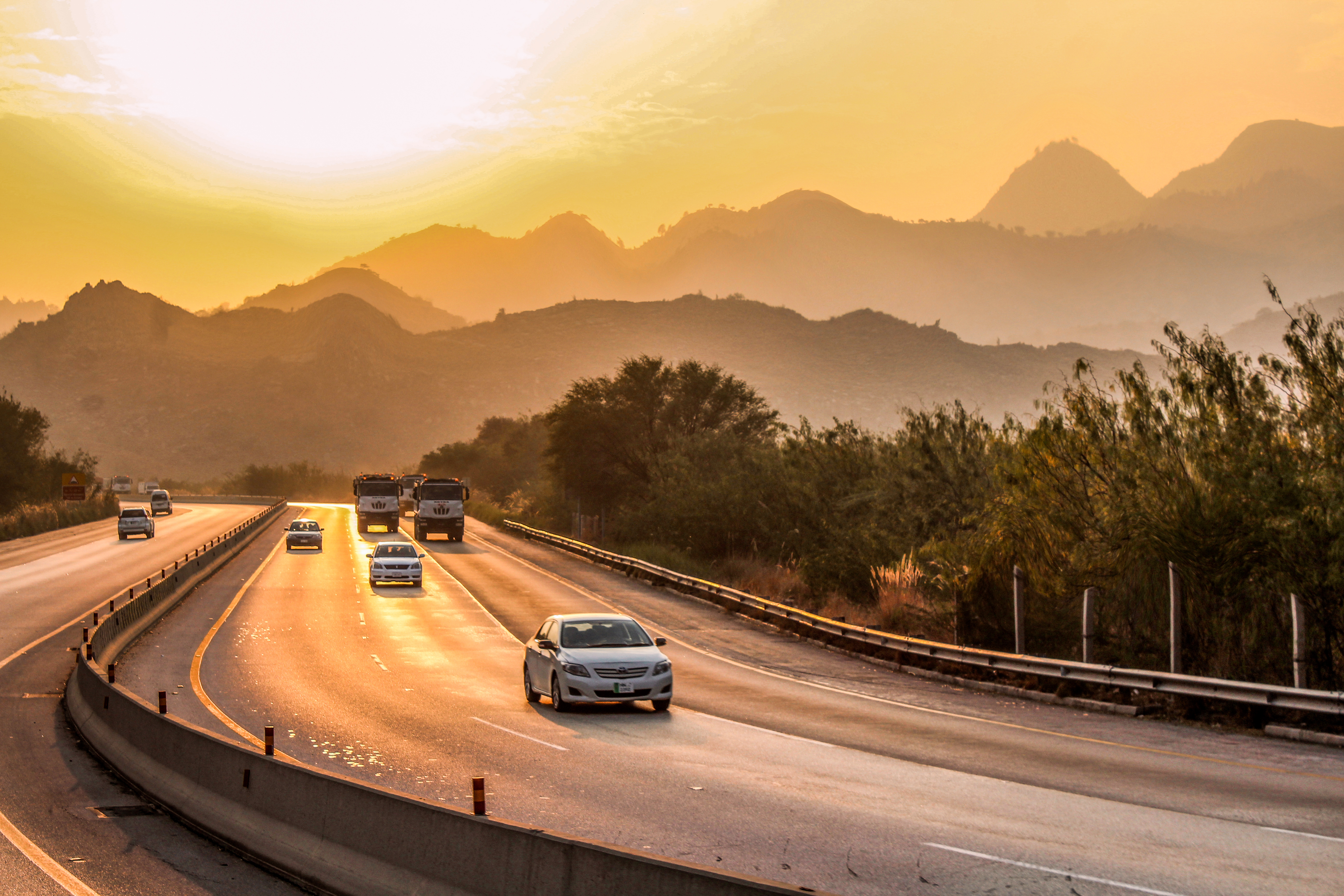
The motorway passing through the Salt Range

The M-2 starts to the west of Lahore, at the Thokar Niaz Baig junction of N-5 (National Highway 5). Once it crosses the Ravi River, it diverges from the N-5 (also known as Grand Trunk Road) and heads west towards Sheikhupura. After passing the Sheikhupura Interchange, the Khanqah Dogran Interchange comes at a distance of 36 km from the Sheikhupura Interchange. Once at Pindi Bhattian, it crosses the M-4 junction and turns north-west. It continues all the way to Kallar Kahar, where it enters the Salt Range. Past the Salt Range, the M-2 turns north and ends just west of Rawalpindi at the junction between the Islamabad Link Road and the M-1. It then continues on to eventually become the M-1 motorway, linking Islamabad and Rawalpindi with Peshawar.

The whole stretch of the M-2 consists of six lanes. There are a number of rest areas along the route, with eateries, washroom, fuel stations, and vehicle maintenance workshops.

== Interchanges ==
M-2 Motorway Junctions
Interchange	Junction	West bound exits	East bound exits
M-2 Zero Point, Lahore		Start of motorway	Road continues as Abdul Sattar Edhi Road to Lahore
M-2 Zero Point, Lahore		N-5 – to Multan	N-5 – to Lahore, Canal Bank Road to Lahore
Babu Sabu Interchange		Band Road to Chowk Yatim Khana, LRR	Band Road to Chowk Yatim Khana, LRR
M-3 Lahore-Abdul Hakeem	AbdHk	M-3 – Lahore-Abdul Hakeem Motorway	M-3 – Lahore-Abdul Hakeem Motorway
Faiz Pure Interchange		Lahore-Jaranwala Road to Jaranwala	Lahore-Jaranwala Road to Shahdara Town, Lahore
Kot Abdul Malik Interchange		N-60 – to Sheikhupura	N-60 – to Lahore
Kala Shah Kaku Interchange		Lahore Bypass to Kala Shah Kaku & N-5	Lahore Bypass to Kala Shah Kaku & N-5
Sheikhupura Interchange		Gujranwala–Sheikhupura Road to Sheikhupura	Gujranwala–Sheikhupura Road to Gujranwala
Hiran Minar Interchange		Jandiala–Sheikhupura Road to Hiran Minar, Sheikhupura	Jandiala–Sheikhupura Road to Jandiala Sher Khan
Khanqah Dogran Interchange		Khanqah Dogran Road to Khanqah Dogran	Khanqah Dogran Road to Hafizabad
Sukheki Interchange		Hafizabad-Sukheki Road to Sukheki	Hafizabad-Sukheki Road to Hafizabad
M-4 Pindi Bhattian-Multan	Mltn	M-4 – Pindi Bhattian-Multan Motorway	M-4 – Pindi Bhattian-Multan Motorway
Pindi Bhattian Interchange		Wazirabad Road to Pindi Bhattian, Chiniot & Jhang	Wazirabad Road to Wazirabad
Makhdoom Interchange		Sial-Phalia Road to Sial More & Sargodha	Sial-Phalia Road to Phalia & Gujrat
Kot Momin Interchange		Kot Momin, Bhalwal	Bhabra
Saalam Interchange		Sargodha-Gujrat Road to Bhalwal, Sargodha	Sargodha-Gujrat Road to Mandi Bahauddin
Bhera Interchange		Bhera-Jhawarian Road to Jhawarian, Shahpur	Bhera-Jhawarian Road to Bhera, Malakwal
Lilla Interchange		Pind Dadan Khan-Lilla Road to Lilla Town, Khushab	Pind Dadan Khan-Lilla Road to Pind Dadan Khan, Jhelum
Kallar Kahar Interchange		Kallar Kahar	Choa Saidanshah, Katas Raj Temples
Balkasar Interchange		Talagang-Chakwal Road to Balkassar, Talagang	Talagang-Chakwal Road to Chakwal
Neelah Dullah Interchange M-2		Neela-Basti Abdullah Road to Neela	Neela-Basti Abdullah Road to Basti Abdullah & Bhagwal
Chakri Interchange		Chakri Road to Chakri	Chakri Road to Rawalpindi
Capital Smart City Interchange		to Capital Smart City	
Thalian Interchange	Exit 22	Access Road for Islamabad International Airport	Rawalpindi Ring Road (future)
Islamabad Interchange	Exit 23	Road continues as M-1 to Peshawar	Start of M-2

== Fuel stations and Service Areas ==
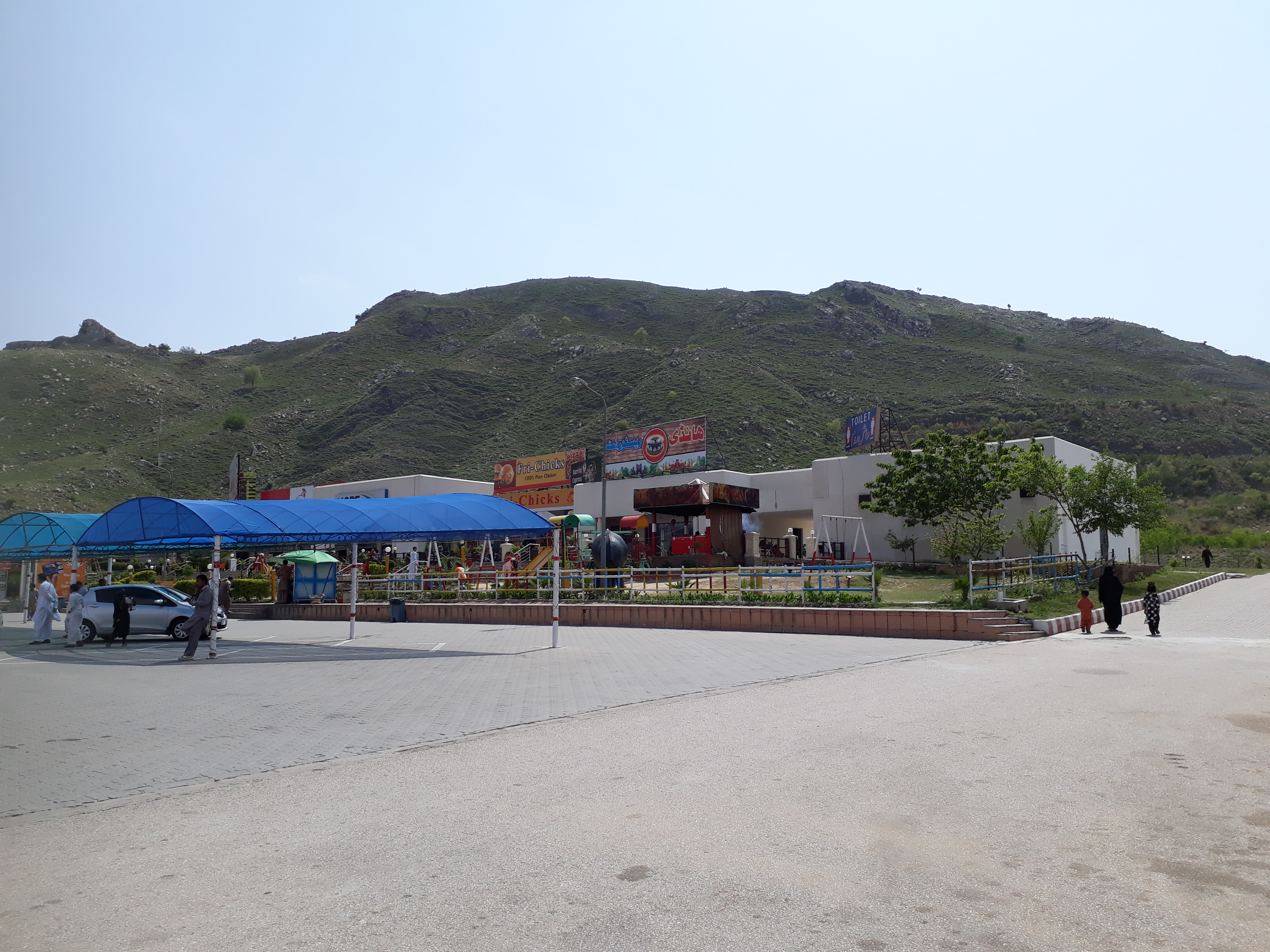
Kallar kahar service area on M-2

Fuel Stations are only available at 5 locations on each side of the road (North & South), These places are called Services Areas (or قیام و طعام)

- Sukheki Services Area - سکھیکی قیام و طعام
- Sial Services Area - سیال قیام و طعام
- Bhera Services Area – بھیرہ قیام و طعام
- Kalar Kahar Services Area - کلر کہار قیام و طعام
- Chakri Services Area - چکری قیام و طعام

These services areas are on both sides of the roads, as crossing from inside the motorway is not possible. While coming from Lahore to Islamabad, the Services Areas are called North Sides (going towards north) whereas coming back towards Lahore the services areas are called South Sides (going towards South Side). For example, Sukheki North Service Area is when a traveller is coming from Lahore to Islamabad, while Sukheki South Services Area is found when going towards Lahore. Average distance between any two service areas is 60–80 km.

== Rest areas ==
Other than Services Areas for the facilities of commuters, the FWO has granted licences for Rest Areas with some basic services. The Rest Areas are being operated by private investors under the supervision of Frontier Works Organization (FWO). Bake & Bite is operating these Rest Areas. Moreover, the Rest Areas contain the following services/amenities on each side of the location:

- Mosque
- Fast Food Restaurants (including KFC, McDonald's, Hardee's, and Subway at some service areas)
- Bakery
- Tuck Shop
- Washrooms
- Workshops
- Petrol pumps

== Entry points for Islamabad and Lahore on M-2 ==
=== Islamabad Entry Points ===
- Balkasar Interchange
- Chakri Interchange
- Thalian Interchange (WARNING: It is better to take the main Islamabad exit because if you take this exit, you will need to go through Islamabad Airport).
- Islamabad Interchange

=== Lahore Entry Points ===
- Kot Abdul Malik Interchange
- Kala Shah Kaku Interchange
- Babu Sabu interchange.
- Thokar Niaz Baig interchange.

== Gallery ==
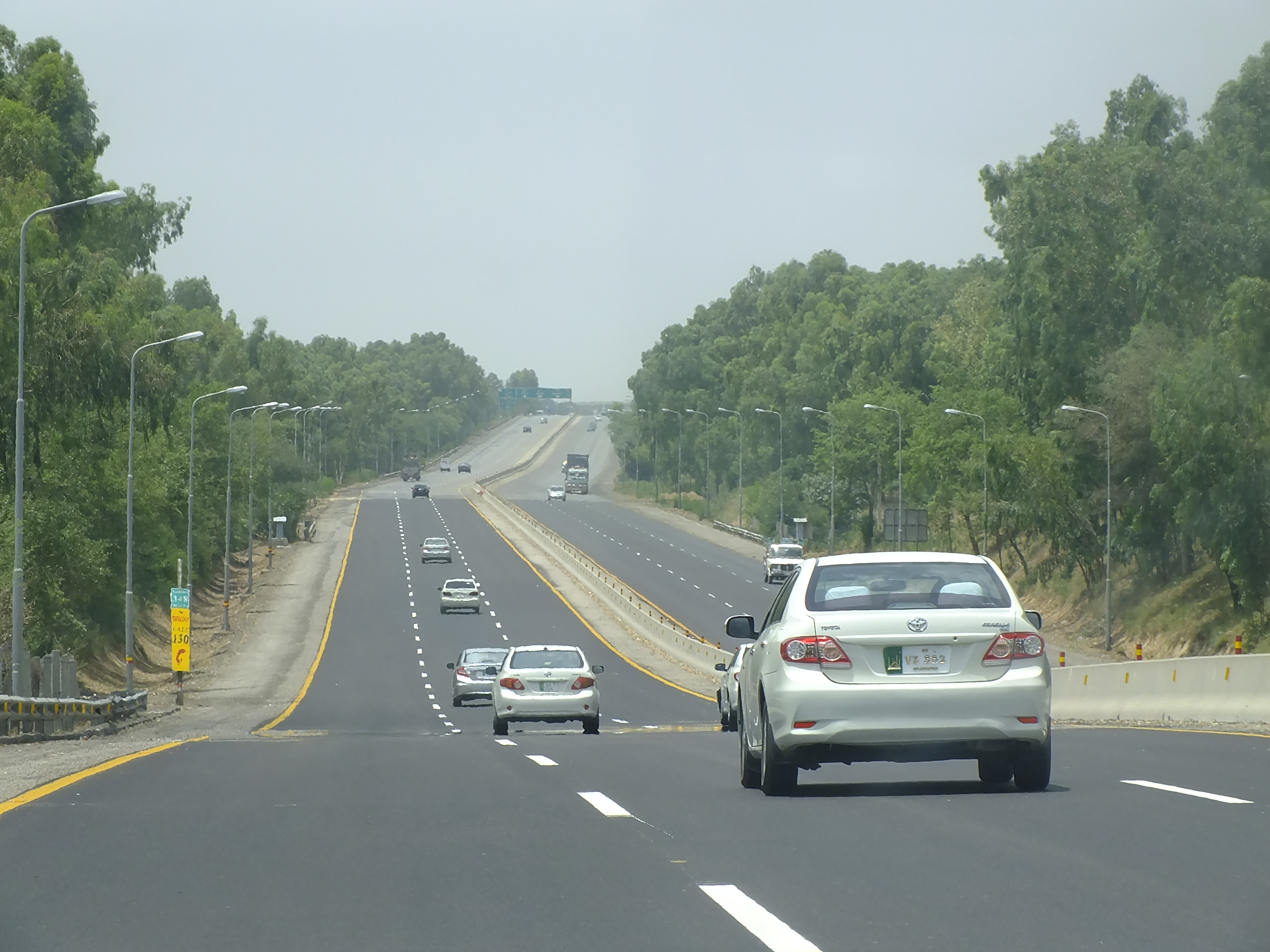
M-2 Motorway on a sunny afternoon

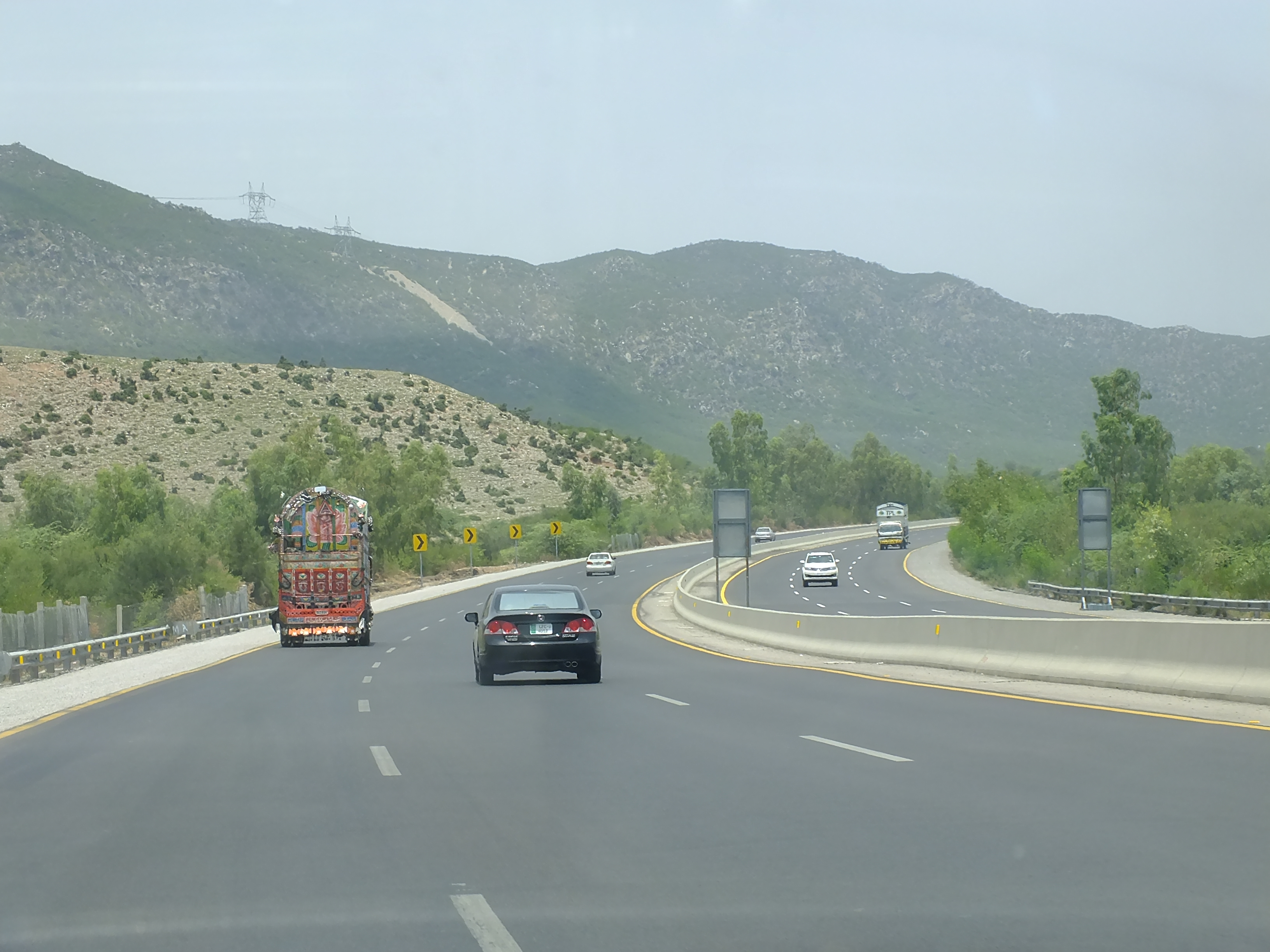
M-2 Motorway approaching Islamabad

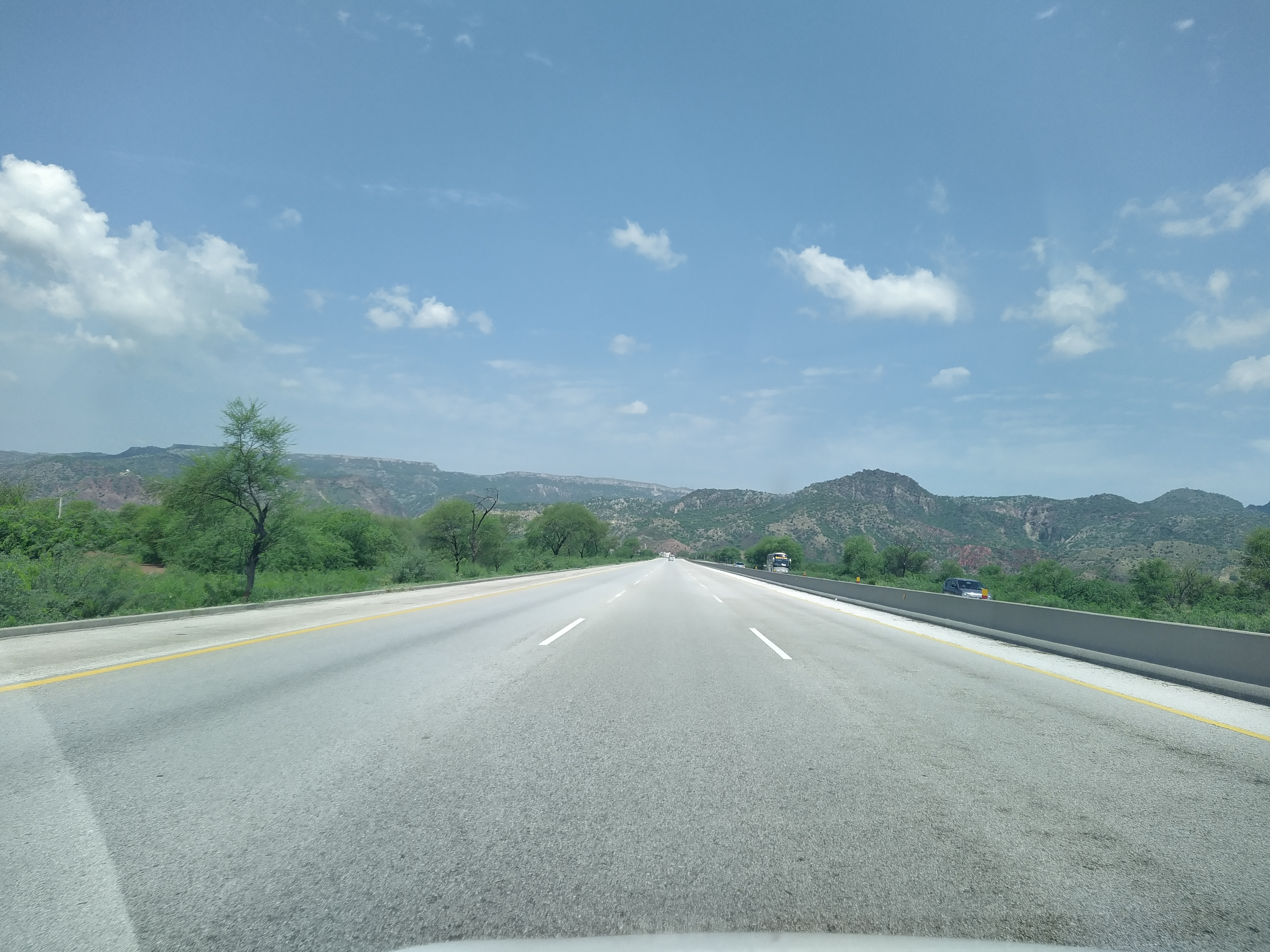
The Motorway on a clear day

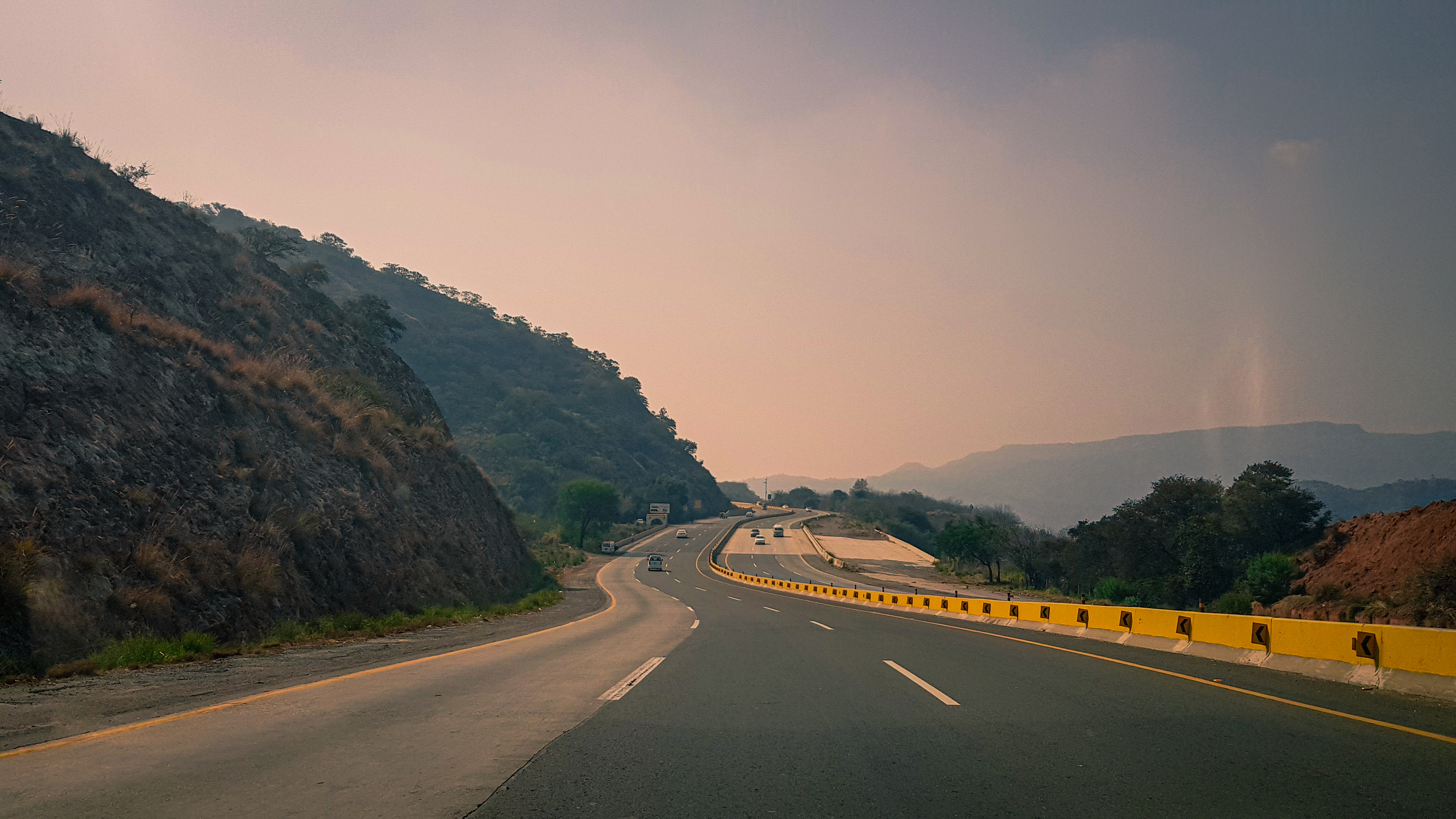
Near the Salt Range

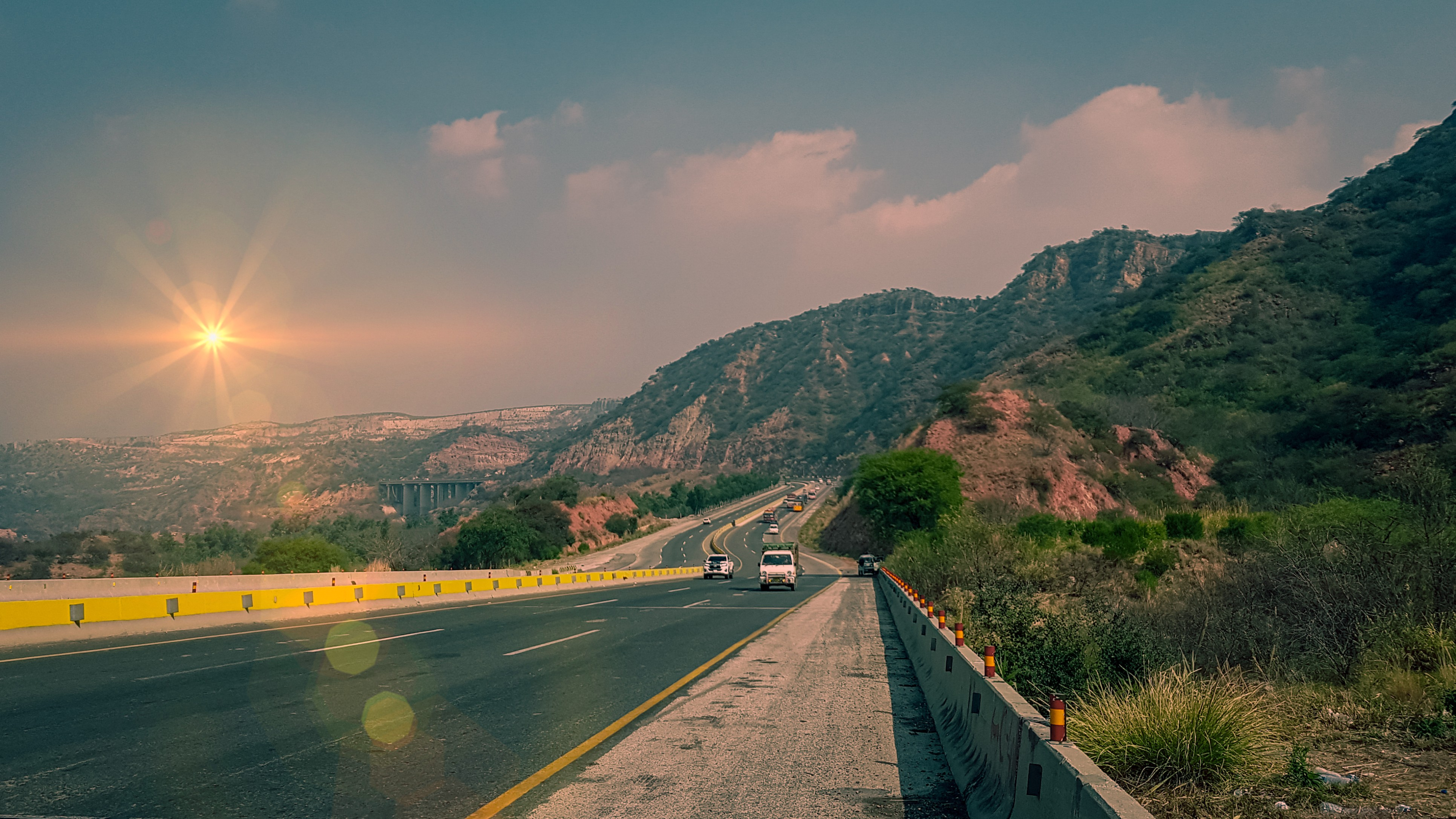
The Motorway in the evening

== See also ==
- Motorways of Pakistan
- National Highways of Pakistan
- National Highway Authority (Pakistan)
- National Highways and Motorway Police
