= Rajana =

Rajana رجانہ
- City town
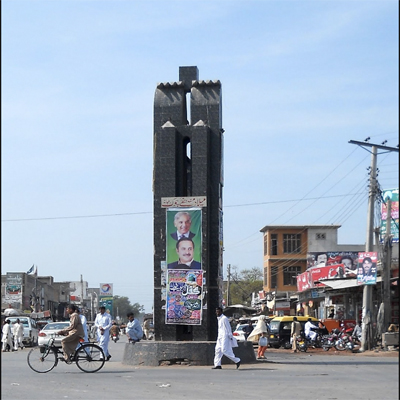

- Location in Pakistan Location in Punjab
- Coordinates: 30°51′16.1″N 72°32′52.8″E
- Country: Pakistan
- Province: Punjab
- District: Toba Tek Singh

Area
  - Total: 50 km^{2} (19 sq mi)
- Elevation: 51.009 m (167.35 ft)

Population (2018)
  - Total: 22,000
  - Density: 440/km^{2} (1,100/sq mi)
- Time zone: UTC+5 (PST)
- Calling code: 046
- Number of union councils: 2

Rajana is a town of Toba Tek Singh District, Punjab, Pakistan. It is 15 km away from Toba Tek Singh. It is located west of Faisalabad, east of Multan, south of Toba Tek Singh and north of Kamalia and Vehari.

The closest villages are Chak No. 284 GB, Chak No. 285 GB, Chak No. 286 GB, Chak No. 360 GB, Chak No. 257 GB and Chak No. 261.

Rajana Foundation Hospital is located on Toba Road, founded by former Governor Punjab Chaudhry Mohammad Sarwar.

Rajana Police Station (known as Thana Rajana) is more than 100 years old, erected in the early 20th century. The Govt. Degree Associate College for Girls and Boys is also located in the town. There are many banks in Rajana like HBL, MCB, Bank Al Habib, NRSP, Faisal Bank, Meezan bank, Alfla Bank.Chaudhary Zain ul Haq son of Nasir Iqbal is the Famous personality of Rajana.
