= M-3 motorway (Pakistan) =

Motorway in Pakistan

M-3 motorway
- ایم 3 موٹروے

Route information
- Maintained by National Highway Authority
- Length: 230 km (140 mi)

Major junctions
- North end: Lahore
- South end: Abdul Hakeem

Location
- Country: Pakistan
- Major cities: Lahore, Sharaqpur Sharif, Nankana Sahib, Jaranwala, Tandlianwala, Samundri, Toba Tek Singh, Kamalia, Pir Mahal, Shorkot, Abdul Hakeem

Highway system
- Transport in Pakistan
← M-2	→ M-4

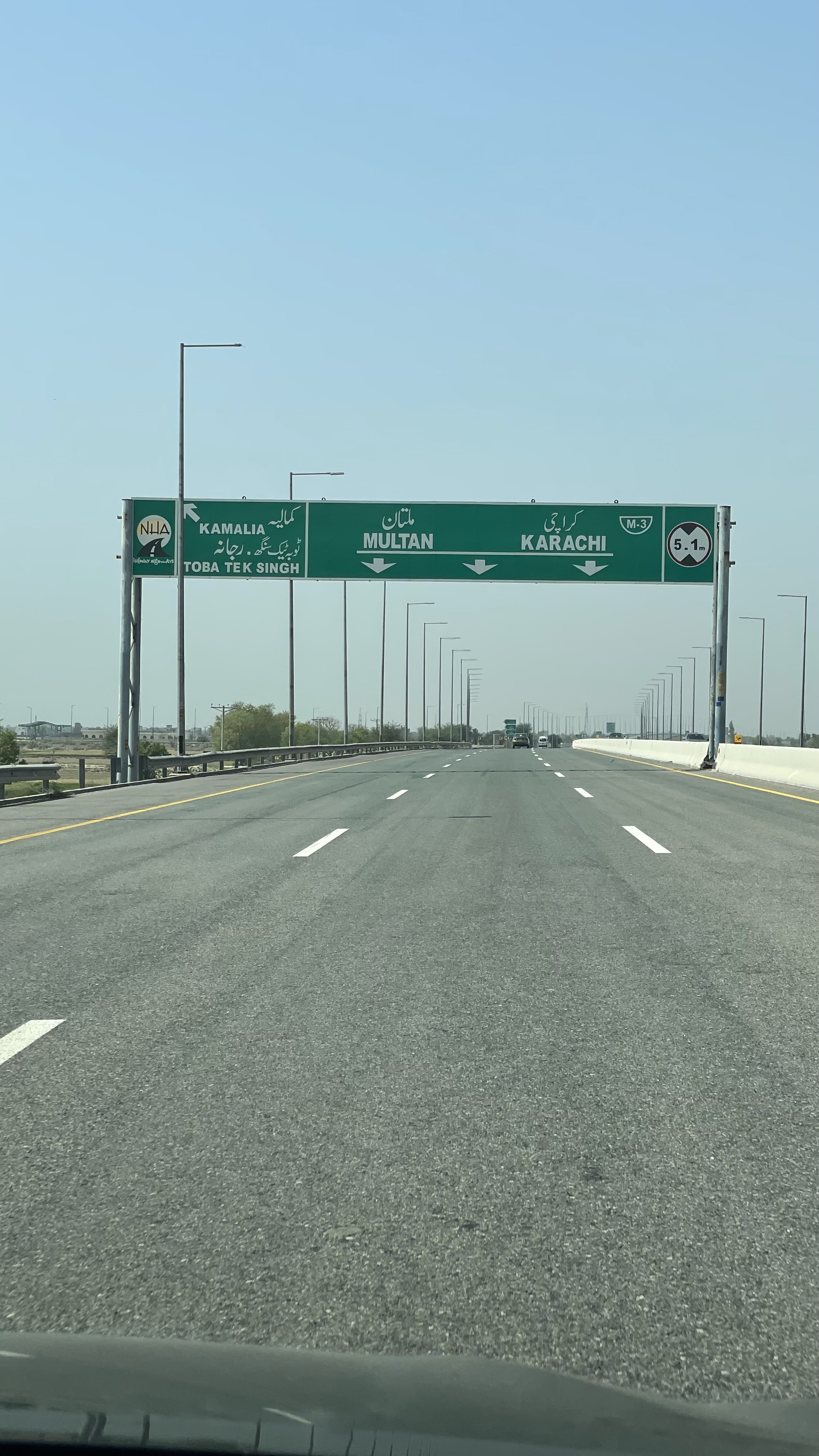
Rare sight in Pakistan: 3 lanes in each direction, near exit to Toba Tek Singh.

The M-3 Motorway (Urdu: موٹروے 3) or the Lahore–Abdul Hakeem Motorway is a north–south motorway in Punjab, Pakistan, connecting the Lahore end of the M-2 to M-4 near Abdul Hakeem.

The M-3 motorway is a parallel motorway of M-4 and takes the eastern route from Lahore to Abdul Hakeem city, while the M-4 motorway connects M-2 to the same Abdul Hakeem city.

The distance between Lahore to Multan via N5 is 323 km, according to the official website of National Highway Authority.

== Inauguration ==
The M-3 motorway (Lahore to Abdul Hakeem Motorway) was inaugurated on 31 March 2019. The M-3 motorway merges with M-4 at Abdul Hakeem (Darkhana). The M-3 motorway first was from Pindi Bhattian to Faisalabad, until the completion of M-4 occurred and M-3 was rerouted from Abdul Hakeem to Lahore. The Pindi Bhattian to Faisalabad segment became M-4.

== Route ==
The M-3 starts at the M-2 Motorway almost instantly after crossing the famous Ravi Toll Plaza in Lahore. It then goes southwest from Lahore and ends where it meets the M-4 motorway near the city of Abdul Hakim located near a small village named Darkhana.

M-3 Motorway is a 6 lane controlled access highway with 3 rest areas along the route. The entire length of the Lahore–Abdul Hakeem section of M-3 was inaugurated on 30 March 2019 and was opened to traffic on 1 April 2019 on the full route from Lahore to Abdul Hakeem.

=== River Ravi ===
The route of M-3 Motorway runs almost parallel to River Ravi although the river might not be seen easily anywhere along this motorway.

=== Railway Line Bridges ===
M-3 Motorway (Lahore to Abdul Hakeem Motorway) has 3 Railway Line Bridges as follows:

1) After crossing Darkhana Toll Plaza i.e. start of M-3 Motorway (railway line coming from Khanewal, towards Shorkot Cantt & vice versa)

2) Before Pirmahal Interchange (railway line coming from Shorkot Cantt, towards Pir Mahal & vice versa)

3) Before Tandlianwala Service Area (railway line coming from Pir Mahal, towards Sheikhupura & vice versa)

== Lahore to Multan Motorway (M-3 + M-4 Motorway) ==
The distance between Lahore to Multan is calculated to facilitate travelers as South end of M-3 Motorway doesn't provide exits/ entry to any District or Divisional Headquarter directly. For that purpose it merges with M-4 Motorway (Pindi Bhattian- Faisalabad- Multan Motorway) and the first Divisional Headquarter nearest to South end is Multan.

Lahore to Abdul Hakeem section (M-3 Motorway) = 230 km

Multan-Abdul Hakeem section (M-4 Motorway) = 103 km

Total Distance, Lahore to Multan, on M-3 + M-4 = 333 km.

The stretch of M-4 Motorway from Abdul Hakeem to Multan is built up with 4 lanes.

This is more than the previous distance of 323 km on National Highway N5, but the average driving speed was significantly less there. The speed allowed on this motorway is 120 km/h for L.T.V. & 110 km/h for H.T.V. So the time taken for traveling is significantly reduced as compared to N-5.

=== Exits/Entry for Multan City ===
M-4 motorway's passes through the South of Multan city and there are 4 interchanges for Multan city:

1. Shamkot (Khanewal/ N-5) Interchange (Northeast or East of Multan): Khanewal, E-5 Expressway; Multan city & DHA Multan. WARNING: Commuters who intend to visit Multan should take the next exit (instead of exiting from this exit as Multan city is still about 40 kms from this exit and cars would need to drive on regular highway road for about 35 minutes to reach Multan city).

2. Shah Rukn-e-Alam/ Makhdoom Rasheed Interchange (South of Multan): Vehari; Multan City Lari Adda (Buses Stands & Truck Stands).

3. Shah Shams Tabrez (Bahawalpur Road/ N-5) Interchange (South of Multan): Bahawalpur & Lodhran; BCG Chowk Multan, MIKD, Multan.

4. Sher Shah Interchange (South of Multan): continues as M-5 Motorway (Multan to Sukkur Motorway) & giving exits to Shujabaad; Multan Cantt; Muzaffargarh, D.G. Khan, Sakhi Sarwar, Rakhi Gaj, Fort Munro, Loralai, Qila Saif-ullah & Quetta.

=== M-3/M-4 Junction ===
At Abdul Hakeem (Darkhana) M3 Motorway joins with the somewhat parallel M4 Motorway (Pindi Bhattian- Faisalabad- Multan Motorway) in a "Y" junction form. Analyzing "Y" when heading North from Multan (Khanewal/ Shamkot), the base/ long arm of "Y" represents Motorway (M4) coming from Multan, while the left arm of "Y" represents Motorway (M4 continuation) going towards Faisalabad, Pindi Bhattian & subsequently M4 Motorway merging with M2 Motorway (Lahore Islamabad Motorway) for way up to Islamabad & Peshawar (M1 Motorway). The right arm of "Y" shows the Motorway going towards Lahore (start of M3 Motorway).

== Junctions and interchanges ==
M3 Motorway Junctions
North bound exits	Junction	South bound exits
M-2 – Islamabad-Lahore Motorway		M-2 – Islamabad-Lahore Motorway
Sheikhupura		Sharaqpur
Nankana Sahib		Khiaray Kalan
Jaranwala		Syedwala
Samundri		Tandlianwala
Rajana, Toba Tek Singh		Kamalia
Shorkot Cantonment		Pir Mahal
Towards Abdul Hakeem & Multan M-4 – Pindi Bhattian Multan Motorway		Towards Shorkot & Faisalabad M-4 – Pindi Bhattian Multan Motorway

=== Service Areas ===
1. Near Nankana Sahib interchange
2. Samundari interchange Chak 441gb
3. Phlore Near Rajana Interchange 4. Tandlianwala Service Area Near Chak No 363 G, B

=== Rest Area ===
1. Samundari interchange
2. Rajana interchange
3. Pir Mahal interchange
4. Darkhana road near Abdulhakim interchange near chak 17gb kake shah

== See also ==
- Motorways of Pakistan
- National Highways of Pakistan
- Transport in Pakistan
- National Highway Authority
