= Pindi Bhattian =

City in Punjab, Pakistan

Pindi Bhattian پِنڈى بھٹياں
- City
- Location of Pindi Bhattian in Pakistan
- Coordinates: 31°53′45″N 73°16′34″E
- Country: Pakistan
- Province: Punjab
- District: Hafizabad District
- Tehsil: Pindi Bhattian Tehsil

Government
  - Type: Municipal Committee
  - Chairman: None (Vacant)
- Elevation: 184 m (604 ft)

Population (2023)
  - City: 66,511
- Time zone: UTC+5 (PST)
  - Summer (DST): UTC+6 (PDT)
- Postal code: 52180
- Dialling code: 0547
- Distance(s): From: • Lahore - 120 km; • Faisalabad - 80 km; • Islamabad - 350 km; • Karachi - km; • Peshawar - km; • Quetta - km; • Multan - km; • Muzaffarabad - km; • Gilgit - km

Pindi Bhattian (Punjabi, Urdu: پِنڈى بھٹياں) is a city and the administrative headquarters of Pindi Bhattian Tehsil, Hafizabad District in Punjab, Pakistan. It is famous for being the birthplace of the 16th-century Punjabi folk hero, Dulla Bhatti, who led a rebellion against the Mughal rule in the Punjab.

Commercially, Pindi Bhattian lies at the heart of Punjab and northern Pakistan. Pindi Bhattian is connected through the M2 motorway to major cities like Lahore, Sheikhupura, Islamabad, and Peshawar. Through M3, Pindi Bhattian is connected with Faisalabad, Multan and connecting to major cities of Baluchistan and Sindh like Karachi. E3 (Expressway) is being upgraded to connect Sialkot via Wazirabad, whereas Pindi Bhattian is also connected to Hafizabad, Gujranwala, and Daska. On the western side it is connected to a major city like Jhang, Sargodha, and Mianwali. Mianwali being the main city of the Western CPEC route would be another commercial hub that will connect KPK and Punjab.

== Background ==
Pindi Bhattian is one of the old towns of Pakistan and the home town of Dulla Bhatti, a 16th-century Muslim Rajput rebel and folk hero of Punjab. Its economy also mostly depends upon agriculture. It has mostly English medium institutions for education. All the secondary and intermediate educational institutions are affiliated with BISE Gujranwala. In his Dulle di bar: Dulla Bhatti and his homeland, the local historian Asad Saleem Sheikh has presented a comprehensive view of Pindi Bhattian in the times of Mughal Empire.

== Demographics ==
Population

Historical population
Year	Pop.	±%
1972	10,039	—
1981	16,819	+67.5%
1998	29,917	+77.9%
2017	55,356	+85.0%
2023	66,511	+20.2%

According to official 2023 census results, the population of Pindi Bhattian city is 66,511.

== Communication ==
Pindi Bhattian is situated on M-2 motorway and is considered an important interchange of M2. Moreover, it is also situated on Sheikhupura–Sargodha–Mianwali Highway. A motorway leads to Faisalabad from Pindi Bhattian known as M4. Another highway connects Pindi Bhattian to Wazirabad via Jalalpur Bhattian and Rasulpur Tarar which is being converted into Expressway E3 under NHA. A highway connects Pindi Bhattian to Chiniot and Jhang. Hence Pindi Bhattian is a junction of several important motorways/highways. There is no railway station in the city; the nearest railway station is that of Sukheke Mandi.

Dahar, Saraj, Arain, Khatri, Hanjra, Kharal, Toor, Goraya, Waseer, Bhatti, Sial, and Mughal are dominant tribes of the area.

== See also ==
- Bhawana
- List of schools in Pakistan
- Nautheh
