= Pindi Bhattian Tehsil =

Tehsil in Hafizabad District

Pindi Bhattian Tehsil تحصِيل پِنڈى بهٹياں
- Tehsil
- Country: Pakistan
- Province: (Punjab, Pakistan) Punjab
- District: Hafizabad
- Headquarters: Pindi Bhattian

Population (2017)
  - Tehsil: 493,222
  - Urban: 138,896
  - Rural: 354,326

Pindi Bhattian (Urdu: تحصِيل پِنڈى بهٹياں), is a tehsil or an administrative sub-division of Hafizabad district located on the left bank of Chenab River. Pindi Bhattian is the principal city and administrative headquarter of the tehsil.

== Notable people ==
- Chaudhry Muhammad Asad Ullah, Provincial Assembly of the Punjab (2013 - 2018)
