= Punjab Highway Department =

Punjab Highway Department محکمۂ شاہرات پنجاب
- Abbreviation: PHD
- Legal status: Active
- Headquarters: Lahore, Pakistan
- Region served: Punjab
- Official language: Urdu; English
- Website: Punjab Highway Department

The Punjab Highway Department (Urdu, Punjabi: محکمہ شاہرات پنجاب) constructs and maintains the provincial highways in Punjab, Pakistan. It currently maintains more than 38,000 kilometers of roads.

== Division ==
The Punjab Highway Department is divided into four wings: Highway (North Zone), Highway (South Zone), Highway (Central Zone), and Highway (Maintenance & Repair). Highway M&R executes routine and special repair of provincial roads, while the other three wings are responsible for the rehabilitation, reconstruction of existing roads, construction of new roads, and maintenance and construction of bridges and culverts in the province. Each wing is headed by a chief engineer.

== See also ==
- Provincial Highways of Punjab
