= Chauburji (Lahore Metro) =

Rapid transit station in Lahore, Pakistan

Chauburji چو برجی
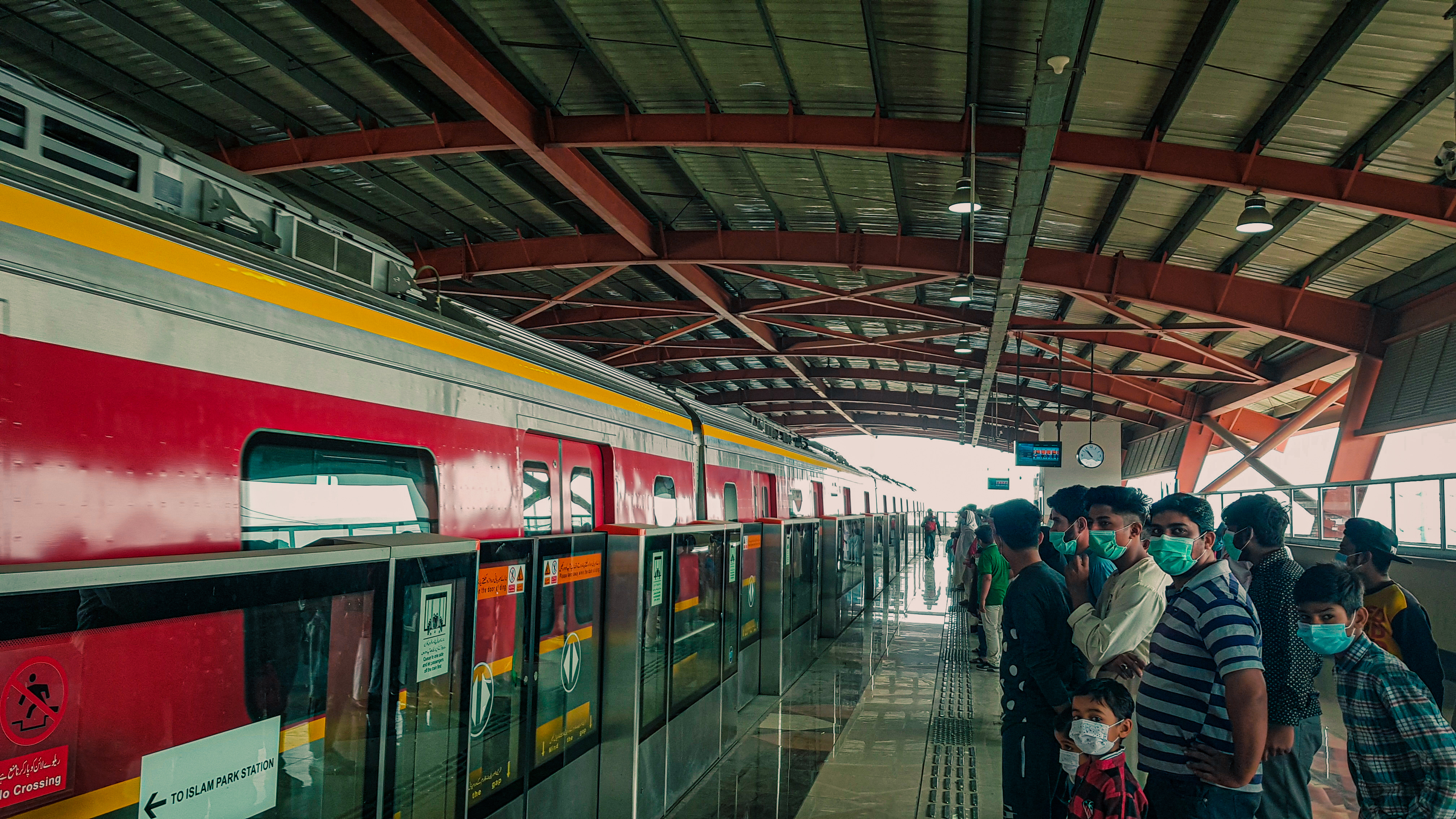
- One of the two elevated platforms in Chauburji station

General information
- Location: Multan Road, near Chauburji, Lahore, Punjab; Pakistan
- Coordinates: 31.5523°N 74.3029°E
- System: Metro station
- Operator: PMA
- Line: Orange Line
- Platforms: 2
- Tracks: 2

Construction
- Structure type: Elevated
- Accessible: Yes

History
- Opened: 25 October 2020

Services
Preceding station	Lahore Metro	Following station
Anarkali towards Dera Gujran Terminal	Orange Line	Gulshan-e-Ravi towards Ali Town Terminal
Route map
Location

Chauburji (Punjabi and Urdu: چو برجی, "Four Towers") is a rapid transit station serving the Orange Line of the Lahore Metro in Lahore, Pakistan. It is near the Chauburji monument.

== History ==
In August 2016, the Court halted construction of the metro within 200 feet of any heritage site, including Chauburji in order to prevent what UNESCO termed as potentially "irreversible damage", were the line to be constructed in its present form. The Chauburji station was originally planned to be underground, but it was changed to an elevated station to comply with the UNESCO regulations.

The Chauburji station was opened after the inauguration of the Orange Line on 25 October 2020.

== See also ==
- Lahore Metrobus
- Orange Line (Lahore Metro)
- Lahore Metro
- Transport in Lahore
