= Anarkali (Lahore Metro) =

Rapid transit station in Lahore, Pakistan

Anarkali انارکلی
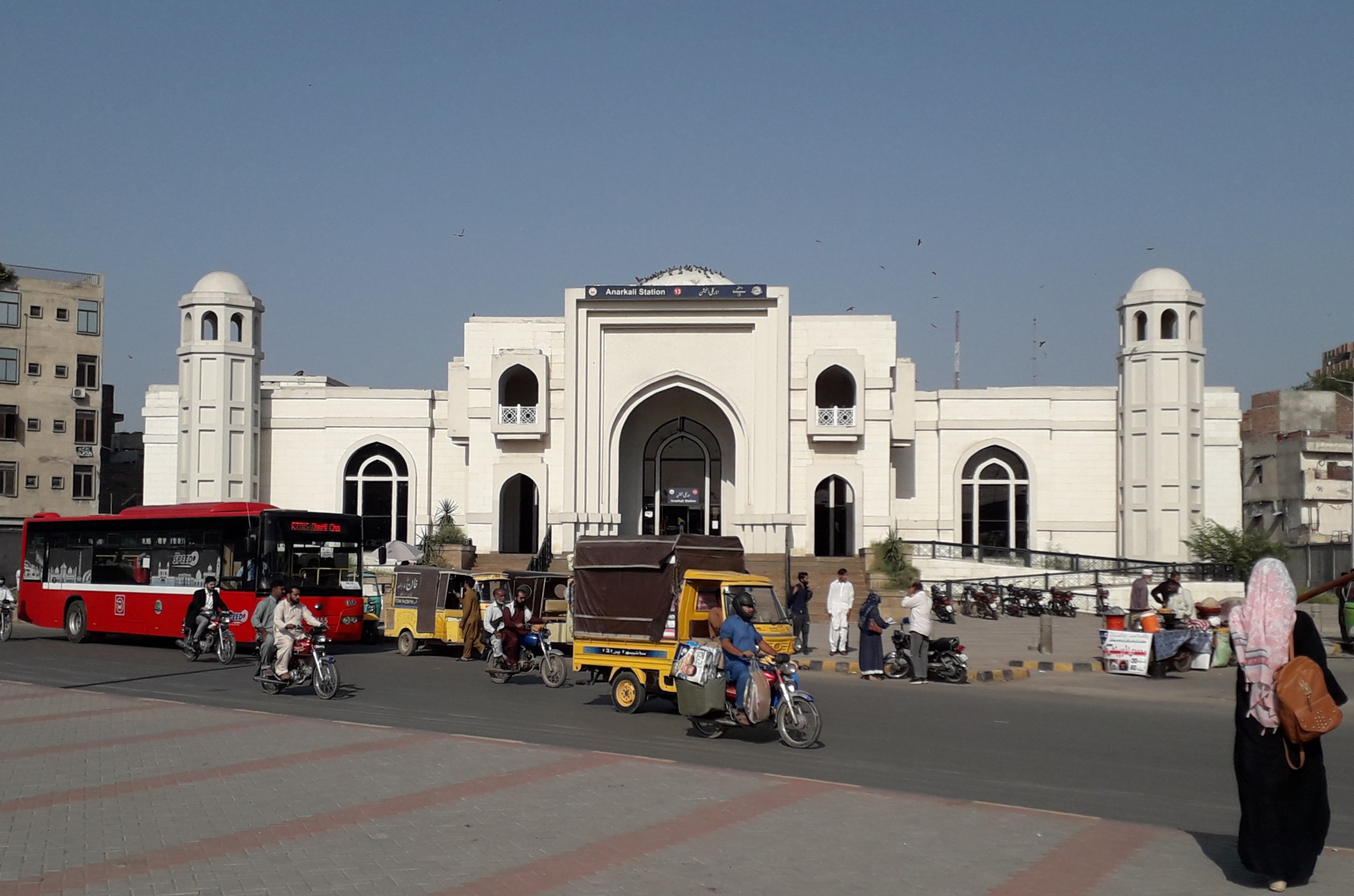
- Anarkali station from outside.

General information
- Location: Syed Mauj Darya Road, Anarkali Bazaar, Lahore-54030, Punjab; Pakistan
- Coordinates: 31°33′44″N 74°18′36″E
- System: Metro station
- Operator: PMA
- Line: Orange Line
- Platforms: 2
- Tracks: 2
- Connections: Metrobus: MAO College Station

Construction
- Structure type: Underground
- Parking: Available
- Accessible: Yes
- Architectural style: Islamic; Mughal

History
- Opened: 25 October 2020

Services
Preceding station	Lahore Metro	Following station
GPO towards Dera Gujran Terminal	Orange Line	Chauburji towards Ali Town Terminal
Route map
Location
- Location within Lahore

Anarkali (Urdu: انارکلی) is a rapid transit station serving the Orange Line of the Lahore Metro in Lahore, Pakistan. It is one of the two underground stations on the Orange Line.

== History ==
The Anarkali station was opened after the completion and inauguration of the Orange Line on 25 October 2020. The construction of the station is reported to have displaced a large number of people, and caused damage to a number of community and heritage sites.

== Etymology ==
The Anarkali station serves the Anarkali Bazaar, which is one of the oldest surviving markets in the Indian Subcontinent, dating back at least 200 years. It derives its name from the nearby mausoleum thought to be that of a courtesan named Anārkalī, who was chased out of town by the order of the Mughal Emperor Akbar for having a love affair with his son, Prince Salīm, who later became Emperor Jahāngīr.

== Station layout ==
Anarkali station has different layout than most metro stations on the Orange Line. Its design is inspired by Islamic and Mughal architecture which have helped in transforming the station building into a landmark in the city centre. The station is located underground, and is 16 meters wide and 121.50 meters long.

=== Platform layout ===
Platform	Line	Destination
Ali Town platform	■Orange Line	For Chauburji, Gulshan-e-Ravi, Samanabad, Sabzazar, Awan Town, Thokar Niaz Baig, Ali Town
Dera Gujran platform	■Orange Line	For GPO, Lahore Junction railway station, UET Lahore, Shalimar Gardens, Dera Gujran

== Connections ==
The Orange line connects to the Lahore Metrobus via an underground walkway from the Anarkali Station of the Orange Line to MAO College Station of the Lahore Metrobus.

== See also ==
- Lahore Metrobus
- Orange Line (Lahore Metro)
- Lahore Metro
- Transport in Lahore
