= Timber Market Metrobus Station =

Bus station in Pakistan

Timber Market Metrobus Station لکڑی بازار میٹروبس اسٹیشن

General information
- Location: Ravi Road; Lahore, Punjab, Pakistan; 54000
- Coordinates: 31°35′40.57″N 74°18′7.28″E
- Owner: Punjab Mass Transit Authority
- Platforms: 2
- Bus operators: Lahore Metrobus

History
- Opened: 2013
Location
- Location within Lahore Location within Pakistan

Timber Market Metrobus Station (Punjabi, Urdu: لکڑی بازار میٹروبس اسٹیشن) is a Lahore Metrobus station in Lahore, Punjab, Pakistan, located on Ravi Road.
