= Shahdara Metrobus Terminal Station =

Metrobus station in Lahore, Pakistan

Shahdara Metrobus Terminal Station شاہدرا میٹروبس ٹرمینل اسٹیشن

General information
- Location: Old Ravi Bridge Road; Shahdara, Punjab, Pakistan; 54950
- Coordinates: 31°36′52.0″N 74°17′28.6″E
- Owner: Punjab Mass Transit Authority
- Platforms: 2
- Bus operators: Lahore Metrobus

History
- Opened: 2013
Location
- Location within Lahore Location within Pakistan

Shahdara Metrobus Terminal Station is a Lahore Metrobus station in Shahdara Bagh, Punjab, Pakistan, located on the north bank of the Ravi River at Old Ravi Bridge Road. The station is located just south of the junction between N-5 National Highway and N-60 National Highway and serves as the northern terminus of the Lahore Metrobus. The terminal consists of a series of covered platforms and a fenced-off busway.

- North Platform: Passenger unloading/layover for northbound buses
- South Platform: Passenger loading for southbound buses

Niazi Chowk station is the next station of Lahore Metrobus.

== See also ==
- Gajjumata Metrobus Terminal Station
- Lahore Metrobus
