= Gajjumata Metrobus Terminal Station =

Metrobus station in Punjab, Pakistan

Gajjumata Metrobus Terminal Station گجو متہ میٹروبس ٹرمینل اسٹیشن

General information
- Location: Ferozepur Road; Gajju Matta, Punjab, Pakistan; 53000
- Coordinates: 31°23′54.3″N 74°21′41.5″E
- Owner: Punjab Mass Transit Authority
- Platforms: 2
- Bus operators: Lahore Metrobus

History
- Opened: 2013
Location
- Location within Lahore Location within Pakistan

Gajjumata Metrobus Terminal Station is a Lahore Metrobus station in Gajju Matta, Punjab, Pakistan, located on Ferozepur Road, just north of Rohi Nala Road. It serves as the southern terminus of the Lahore Metrobus. The terminal consists of a series of covered platforms and a fenced off busway.

- West Platform: Passenger loading for northbound buses
- East Platform: Passenger unloading/layover for southbound buses

== See also ==
- Shahdara Metrobus Terminal Station
- Lahore Metrobus
