= Niazi Chowk Metrobus Station =

Busstation in Lahore

Niazi Chowk Metrobus Station نیازی چوک میٹروبس اسٹیشن

General information
- Location: Multan Road & Ravi Road; Lahore, Punjab, Pakistan; 54000
- Coordinates: 31°36′7.33″N 74°17′57.93″E
- Owner: Punjab Mass Transit Authority
- Platforms: 2
- Bus operators: Lahore Metrobus

History
- Opened: 2013
Location
- Location within Lahore Location within Pakistan

Niazi Chowk Metrobus Station is a Lahore Metrobus station in Lahore, Punjab, Pakistan, along the south bank of the Ravi River at the intersection of Multan Road and Ravi Road.

== See also ==
- Lahore Metrobus
