= Lahore Badami Bagh Bus Terminal =

Bus terminal in Lahore, Pakistan

Lahore Badami Bagh Bus Terminal بادامی باغ بس ٹرمینل

General information
- Location: Lahore, Punjab; Pakistan
- Coordinates: 31.5930474°N 74.3174947°E
- System: Bus Station

Construction
- Parking: Yes
Location
- Location within Lahore Location within Punjab, Pakistan Location within Pakistan

Lahore Badami Bagh Bus Terminal (Urdu: بادامی باغ بس ٹرمینل, or Lari Adda), is one of three major bus terminals in Lahore, Punjab, Pakistan. It is located near Badami Bagh railway station on Circular Road. Badami Bagh serves as the major entry and exit point for all bus travellers.

== In popular culture ==
- In 1999, Pakistani singer Sajjad Ali released a song titled as "Larri Adda" as part of his album "Sohni Lag Di" which was also featured in film Aik Aur Love Story.

== See also ==
- Lahore Jinnah Bus Terminal (Thokar Niaz Beg)
