= Sultan Town =

One of the small towns within the vicinity of the city of Lahore, Punjab, Pakistan.

Also known by the name of Garden Villas Housing Society.

== Location ==
Sultan Town is located at 1 km off Raiwind Road Lahore from the square of Thokar Niaz Baig. Connected to the entrance of the city through Motorway, M2, this town is accessible to people coming into the station after a drive of around 4 kilometers.

Initially it was considered to be outside the main city, but after the newly planned constructions in the area it is slowly becoming a part of the Main district.

== Places Nearby ==
Lahore Orange Metro Train has its Main Terminal (station) being constructed in the outskirts of the Town.

=== References ===
1. Map of Sultan Town.

2. Block and Sector distribution, color coded.

3. https://web.facebook.com/Sultan-Town-Lahore-1567175800234315/?_rdr
