= Bhadrakali temple, Lahore =

Hindu temple in Lahore, Pakistan

Bhadhar Kali Mandar

Religion
- Affiliation: Hinduism
- Sect: Shaktism
- Deity: Kali or Durga

Location
- Location: Thokar Niaz Beg, Lahore, Punjab, Pakistan

The Bhadhar Kali Mandar is a Hindu temple located in eastern Thokar Niaz Beg, Lahore in Punjab, Pakistan. The temple is dedicated to Kali Mata. Other sources claim it is dedicated to Durga.

== History ==
The temple is referenced by Kanhiya Lal in his work on Lahore's history, Twarikh-e-Lahore. The area the temple is located in used to be known as Badr Kal. Iqbal Kaisar claimed the site was around 2,000 years old. In historical times, it was the site where a harvest festival was celebrated in June. According to the Walled City of Lahore Authority, the celebration was Baisakhi. It was the main attraction of Niaz Beg.

Maharaja Ranjit Singh constructed a new temple beside the old one but according to lore, the sadhus had a dream where Kali refused to shift to the new temple that was built. In 1947, the Hindu population of Lahore migrated to the Republic of India, leaving the temple abandoned. After partition, the area of the temple was settled by migrants from the Mewat region. The Pakistani government allocated abandoned former temple properties to the new settlers, with the temple complex becoming inhabited by the Meo community. In the late 1960s or early 1970's, the former temple was converted into a mosque to prevent the land mafia from encroaching and claiming its property. Despite this, the sacred space dedicated to the goddess was kept. The temple later was converted from a mosque to a government school in 1980. In the aftermath of the 1992 Babri Masjid incident, a 150-person mob from neighbouring Hanjarwal desired to demolish the temple in December 1992 as revenge but a Muslim man named Bashir Ahmad Meo stopped them and saved the temple. He did this by explaining that destroying the temple in revenge was not in-agreement with Islam, which convinced most of the mob but some of them still burnt one of its wooden doors and damaged part of its boundary wall. Locals planned to demolish the temple in 2009, with its top floor being demolished. Part of the temple is now a shop.

== Architecture ==
Originally, the complex contained stupas, two temples, a step-well, and a pool, and a banyan tree, but much of the structures have disappeared over the years. The temple is 20–25 feet tall and its plinth rises 6 feet from the ground. The complex has a main, three-storied temple structure with a pool (sarovar) within it that is fed by twelve wells, with four fountains on each corner, and has a drainage system. On the walls of the temple are fresco paintings depicting geometric, floral, and avian designs in orange, green, and blue pigments. At-least five samadhs survive within the complex, adorned with frescoes. There are three bolian (wells) associated with the complex. A banyan tree existed by the temple's entrance but can no longer be traced, likely it was cut-down to make room for new residential constructions.

== Popular culture ==
In the 1986 film Laado, the setting of the temple complex can be seen in a fighting-scene.
