= Jain Digambar temple, Lahore =

Jain temple in Lahore

- جین مندر

Religion
- Affiliation: Jainism
- Ecclesiastical or organizational status: Restored
- Year consecrated: c. 1940
- Status: Active (reopened 2022)

Location
- Location: Lytton Road, Old Anarkali, Lahore, Punjab, Pakistan
- Interactive map of Jain Digambar temple, Lahore
- Coordinates: 31.5601°N 74.3093°E

Architecture
- Type: Jain temple
- Style: Shikhara
- Completed: c. 1940
- Height (max): 13 m

The Jain Digambar temple is a Jain temple located on Lytton Road in Old Anarkali, Lahore.

== History ==
While its exact construction date remains uncertain, it is believed to have been erected in the late 1930s or early 1940s. According to Iqbal Qaiser, a Punjabi author, it was constructed by a woman in 1940.

Following the creation of Pakistan in 1947, the temple underwent a period of neglect. Significant damage was inflicted in 1992 in the wake of the Babri Masjid demolition in Ayodhya. Due to prevailing misconceptions linking Jainism with Hinduism, the Jain Mandir in Lahore was targeted. Despite its durable construction, the temple was substantially damaged over two days, with the aid of a crane facilitating the process. The remnants of its dome remained for roughly three decades.

In relation to the development of the Orange Line Metro Train (OLMT), concerns were raised about the temple's fate. By 2016, the remaining parts of the temple were enclosed by a wall, with some of the surrounding area allocated to the OLMT project.

=== Restoration ===
In 2014, the Evacuee Trust Property Board was tasked with renovating and restoring former temples. In December 2021, the Supreme Court of Pakistan ordered the restoration of the Jain Mandir, in addition to a Hindu temple in Neela Gumbad. Restoration efforts included reinforcing the foundation, repositioning the original dome, updating infrastructure, and converting the nearby space for public use. The restoration project took eight months at a cost of 70 lakh Pakistani rupees. In June 2022, the Jain Mandir in Anarkali was reopened for religious practices. The renovated temple, now standing at thirteen meters, is situated opposite the Anarkali station of the OLMT.

== Architecture ==
The temple was designed in the Shikhara architectural style, a term derived from the Sanskrit word for "mountain peak." Characteristic features of Jain temples. The temple features a tapering tower with religious motifs and etchings, as well as adjacent courtyards, are evident in its design.
