= Lahore Jinnah Bus Terminal =

Bus terminal in Lahore

Lahore Jinnah Bus Terminal لہر جناح بس ٹرمینل

General information
- Location: Thokar Niaz Beg; Lahore, Punjab; Pakistan
- Coordinates: 31.46794°N 74.22538°E
- System: Bus Station

Construction
- Parking: Yes
Location
- Location within Lahore Location within Punjab, Pakistan Location within Pakistan

Lahore Jinnah Bus Terminal (Urdu: لہر جناح بس ٹرمینل, or Thokar Niaz Beg Bus Terminal), is one of three major bus terminals in Lahore, Punjab, Pakistan. It is located in Thokar Niaz Beg at the interchange between the M2 motorway and N5 national highway (Multan Road). Thokar Niaz Beg serves as the major entry and exit point from south Lahore.

== See also ==
- Lahore Badami Bagh Bus Terminal (Badami Bagh)
- Lahore City Bus Terminal (Yateem Khana)
