= Char Minar =

Char Minar, literally meaning "four towers" in Persian, may refer to:

- Charminar, a mosque in Hyderabad, India
  - Charminar Assembly constituency
  - Charminar Express, Indian Railways
- Charminar (2003 film), a 2003 Indian Kannada-language film directed by Sagar
- Charminar (2013 film), a 2013 Indian Kannada-language film directed by R. Chandru
- Charminar (2018 film), a 2018 Indian film directed by Ajith C. Logesh
- Chauburji, a Mughal era monument in Lahore
- Chor Minor, a mosque in Bukhara, Uzbekistan
- Charminar, a now defunct cigarette brand in India, Pakistan, and Bangladesh, see VST Industries
  - Charminar Challenge Indian Open, golf tournament

== See also ==
- Chor Minar (Tower of Thieves), a historic tower in Delhi, India
