= Lahore Metro =

Metro railway of Pakistan

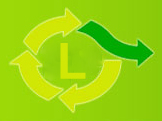

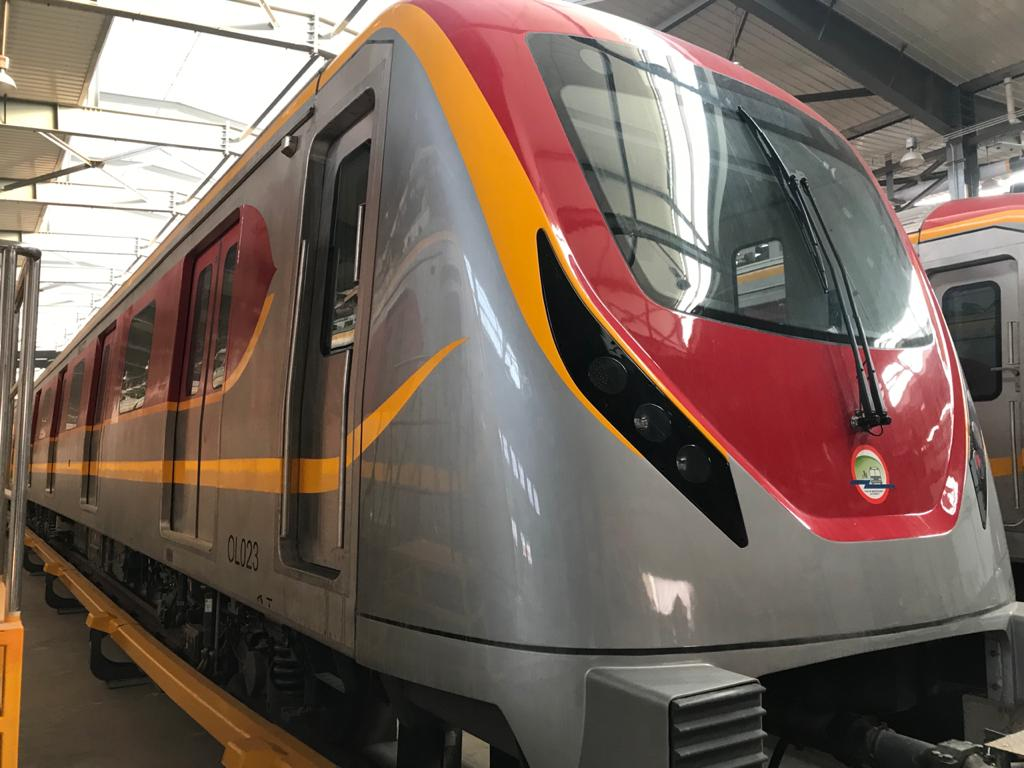
- Train of the Orange Line at a station.

Overview
- Native name: لاہور میٹرو
- Owner: Government of Punjab, Pakistan; Government of Pakistan
- Locale: Lahore, Punjab, Pakistan,
- Transit type: Rapid transit
- Number of lines: 1 completed, 1 approved, 2 planned
- Number of stations: 26
- Daily ridership: 178,714 (2023)

Operation
- Began operation: October 25, 2020; 6 years ago
- Operators: Punjab Mass Transit Authority; Guangzhou Metro

Technical
- System length: 27.1 km (16.8 mi)
- Track gauge: 1,435 mm (4 ft 8 1/2 in) standard gauge
System map

Lahore Metro is a rapid transit system in Lahore, Punjab, Pakistan. Four metro lines have been proposed, of which only the Orange Line is currently operational. It is also Pakistan's first and only metro line system.

== History ==
The Lahore Metro was first proposed in 1991 and reviewed in 1993 by the Lahore Traffic & Transport Studies, funded by the World Bank. The project was subsequently shelved. In 2005, the Ministry of Transport revisited the project and carried out a feasibility study. In 2007, the Asian Development Bank provided Rs. 1 billion (US$3.6 million) to conduct a study on the project. The initial plan called for an 82-kilometre (51 mi) rail network with 60 stations to be constructed in four separate phases. The first phase involved the construction of a 27-kilometre (17 mi) rail line between Gajju Matta and Shahdara Bagh, with an 11.6-kilometre (7.2 mi) section underground. Construction was expected to start in 2008 and be completed by 2010. However, in 2008, the project was shelved again as priorities shifted to other projects.

In June 2010, Malaysia-based Scomi International proposed a US$1.15 billion monorail alternative, but that was not approved. At a ceremony in May 2014, an agreement was signed by Chief Minister Punjab Shahbaz Sharif, alongside President Mamnoon Hussain and Chinese Communist Party general secretary Xi Jinping, which gave the go-ahead for the construction of the Orange Line. The project was estimated to cost $1.6 billion.

== Lines ==
=== Orange Line ===
The Orange Line has a length of 27.1 kilometres (16.8 mi) and became operational on 25 October 2020. The line has 26 stations starting from Ali town to Dera Gujran. Anarkali being the busiest and central station.

=== Blue Line ===
The Blue Line is a proposed 24-kilometre (15 mi) line from Chauburji to Eden Avenue.

=== Yellow Line ===
The Yellow Line will span 24 kilometres (15 mi), running from Jinnah Bus Terminal to Harbanspura along Canal Road.

=== Purple Line ===
The Purple Line is a proposed 32-kilometre (20 mi) airport rail link.

== Stations ==
The line has 26 stations. Anarkali and Central stations are underground, while the remaining 24 are elevated. The rail line runs through the centre of each station, with platforms flanking the track. Elevated stations have a width of 22.5 metres, while Anarkali Station is 16 metres wide, and Central Station 49.5 metres wide. Elevated stations are all 102 metres long, while Anarkali and Central Stations are 121.5 and 161.6 metres long, respectively.

Anarkali and Central Stations were initially planned to have two underground levels, Anarkali Station now both feature a ground-level concourse with one underground level, while Central Station has a single underground level, in order reduce the maximum gradient for trains from 35% to 30%. Rail tracks are 9.7 metres (31 ft 9.8 in) below street level at Central Station, and 8.7 metres (28 ft 6.5 in) below street level at Anarkali Station.

Underground stations feature automated doors between platforms and trains. Public areas of the station are air-conditioned during warm months. Elevated stations feature natural ventilation throughout the platforms, with localised air conditioning in public areas of the ticket-hall level.

== Rolling stock ==
Orange Line trains are each composed of five wagons manufactured by China's CRRC Zhuzhou Locomotive, and automated and driverless. A standard Chinese "Type B" train-set consisting of 5 cars with 4 doors each used, that has a stainless steel body and illuminated by LED lighting. Each car has a nominal capacity of 200 seated and standing passengers at an average density of 5 persons per square metre with 20% of passengers seated and 80% standing. A total of 27 trains with 135 cars have been ordered for the system, at a cost of $1 billion. A total of 54 trains are expected to be in service by 2025. The train is powered by a 750-volt third rail.

== Track ==
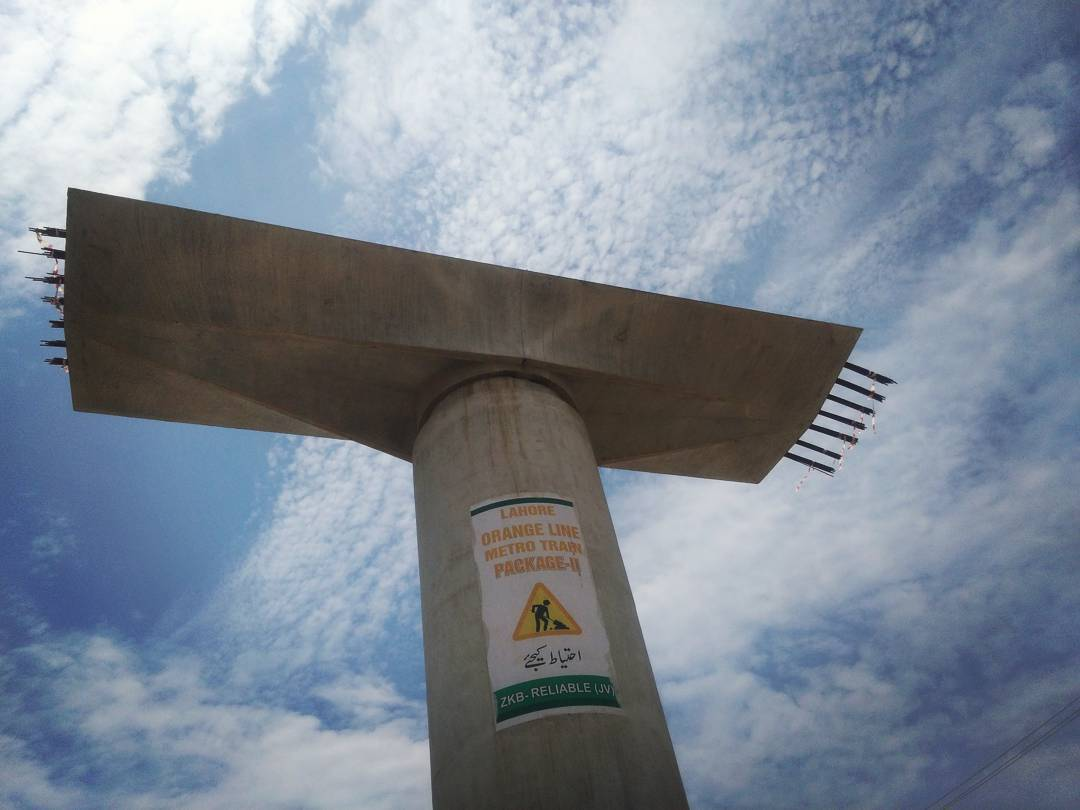
Orange Line Metro rail pillar

The Orange Line's tracks meet China's national standards, and employ jointless track circuits. Mainline track weighs 60 kg/m, while track in the depot and storage yards weighs 50 kg/m. Track was laid upon a monolithic concrete track bed, with crossovers located between every 2 to 3 stations. Double turnover tracks are used at each terminus for turnaround. Track is standard gauge at 1,435 mm (4 ft 8 1/2 in). Fasteners between tracks are elastic.

== Depot ==
A depot was constructed at the northeast portion of the line, directly east of the Lahore Ring Road, while a stabling yard was constructed at the line's southern terminus at Ali Town. The depot is also the site of the Orange Line's central control centre. The depot and stabling yard respectively required 0.56 and 0.49 kilometres of track.

== See also ==
- Lahore Metro Bus
- Karachi Circular Railway
- Pakistan Railways
- Transport in Pakistan
