= Sohaib Ahmad Malik =

Pakistani politician

Member of the Provincial Assembly of the Punjab
- In office 15 August 2018 – 14 January 2023
- Constituency: PP-72 Sargodha-I

Personal details
- Born: Malik Sohaib Ahmed Bherth
- Party: PMLN (2018-present)

Malik Sohaib Ahmed Bherth is a Pakistani lawyer and politician who is currently serving as a provincial minister for Communication & Works department, Punjab. He has been member of the Provincial Assembly of the Punjab since 2024, being elected for the second time. He previously served at this position from August 2018 till January 2023.

== Early life and education ==
Born in Lahore, his father Dr Malik Ijaz Ahmed Bherth and his brother Dr. Malik Mukhtar Ahmed Bherth are both MPAs. He earned his LL.B. (Hons.) and his LL.M (International Law) from London Metropolitan University.

== Political career ==
He was elected to the Provincial Assembly of the Punjab as a candidate of Pakistan Muslim League (N) from Constituency PP-72 (Sargodha-I) in the 2018 Pakistani general election.

In March 2024, he was made part of the Maryam Nawaz cabinet at the provincial level in Punjab, becoming minister of Communication and Works.
