= Punjab Communication and Works Department =

Pakistani provincial ministry department

Communication and Works Department
- محکمہ مواصلات و تعمیرات

Department overview
- Formed: May 1962
- Headquarters: Lahore
- Motto: Construction and Development (Urdu: تعمیر و ترقی)
- Minister responsible: Sohaib Ahmad Malik, Minister of Communication and Works, Punjab
- Department executive: Raja Jahangir Anwar, Secretary
- Child agencies: Punjab Buildings Department; Punjab Highways Department; Special Initiatives Department; Monitoring and Evaluation Department; Architecture Department; Planning and Design Department; Research and Design Department; Punjab Ring Road Authority
- Website: https://cnw.punjab.gov.pk/

The Communication and Works Department is a department of the Government of Punjab, Pakistan. It is responsible for the planning, construction, maintenance, and repair, and management of infrastructure projects in the province, including bridges, public buildings, and roads.

== History ==
In 1849, a military board was established in the subcontinent to oversee public works in the region. By 1854, all public engineering works had been consolidated under a single department, and Public Works Departments were established in all provinces, falling under one central authority. To address the growing demand for public works, three branches were created in 1866: military works, civil works, and railways. In 1869, administrative changes were implemented, leading to the establishment of a separate Buildings and Roads (B&R) branch. This branch further expanded in 1914 with the creation of the position of a consulting architect. Upon Pakistan's independence in 1947, the B&R branch was placed under the control of a single chief engineer and secretary to government, tasked with managing all matters pertaining to communications, buildings, sanitation, water works, and the electrification of government buildings. In May 1962, this system underwent a transformation, resulting in the formation of the C&W Department of the Government of West Pakistan. The B&R and town planning departments were placed under its administrative control.

== Structure ==
The department is divided into various sub-departments, including buildings, highways, special initiatives, monitoring and evaluation, research and design, planning and design, architecture, and the Punjab Ring Road Authority.

=== Highways Department ===
The Punjab Highways Department is responsible for the construction, maintenance, and repair of provincial roads and bridges. It is divided into three zones: North, South, and Central. Each zone is headed by a Chief Engineer, who is a grade-20 officer from the engineering branch of the department.

=== Buildings Department ===
Buildings Department oversees the construction of new buildings and the maintenance and repair of existing public sector buildings in the province. Similar to Highways Department, it is divided into three zones: North, South, and Central, each headed by a Chief Engineer who is a grade 20 officer from the department's engineering branch.

=== Research and Design Department ===
R&D Department is also headed by a chief engineer and it is sub-divided mainly into three branches: Road Research & Material Testing Institute (RR&MTI), Building Research Station, and Road Asset Management System. RR&MTI is responsible for providing technical support to the department such as design of pavement, analysis and testing of road construction materials, evaluation of existing roads, and provide solution to various problems faced field formations. Building Research Station has been established to provide technical support to field formations regarding testing of building materials and carrying out soil analysis for design of foundations of public buildings. Road Asset Management System is responsible for management and maintenance of road infrastructure assets in the province.

Under this department, regional quality testing laboratories have also been established where civil engineering quality tests are performed.

=== Planning and Design Department ===
This department is also headed by a chief engineer. The department is divided into three branches: buildings design, highways design, and bridge directorate. Buildings and highways design branches are responsible for planning, and structural analysis and design of public sector buildings and pavements respectively. Bridge directorate is responsible for structural analysis and design of new bridges in the province.

=== Monitoring and Evaluation Department ===
This department was established in 2021 in place of Punjab Buildings Department (Maintenance and Repair) when restructuring of the C&W Department was done. It's also headed by a chief engineer. This department is responsible for technical inspection of the development projects and provides assistance to the government of the Punjab.

=== Special Initiatives Department ===
This was the second department, along with M&E Department, which was established in 2021 during restructuring. It was established in place of Punjab Highways Department (Maintenance and Repair). It's also headed by a chief engineer. The department is responsible for providing modern engineering solutions for the public sector. Its function is to plan, design, build, and maintain infrastructure projects in the province using the best international practices to meet future development needs. It is also responsible for looking after the projects' execution which are being constructed in Public Private Partnership mode.

=== Architecture Department ===
This department is responsible to oversee the design of architectural drawings and elevations of the public buildings. It provides architectural services to provincial departments. It is headed by chief architect who is a grade-20 officer.

=== Punjab Ring Road Authority ===
This department is responsible to plan, design, develop, manage, and provincial ring roads. It is headed by chairperson.

== List of secretaries ==
Secretary, usually a civil servant from Provincial Management Service (PMS) Punjab or Pakistan Administrative Service, is administrative head of the department.
List of secretaries is as follows:

List of secretaries
Name	Tenure
Brigadier Shadab Ali Khan	22-10-1998 to 10-02-2003
Sibtain Fazal-e-Halim	10-02-2003 to 09-05-2005
Ahmad Yar Khan	09-05-2005 to 08-02-2007
Muhammad Ahsan Raja	08-02-2007 to 10-04-2008
Sikandar Sultan Raja	11-04-2008 to 14-11-2008
Fawad Hasan Fawad	14-11-2008 to 26-02-2009
Capt. (Retd.) Arif Nadeem	13-03-2009 to 31-03-2009
Fawad Hasan Fawad	31-03-2009 to 18-07-2009
Waseem Mukhtar Ch. (Addl. Charge)	18-07-2009 to 16-02-2010
Azam Suleman Khan	16-02-2010 to 08-04-2013
Muhammad Abid Javed	19-04-2013 to11-06-2013
Azam Suleman Khan	11-06-2013 to 25-06-2013
Khayyam Qaiser	04-07-2013 to 19-07-2013
Muhammad Mushtaq Ahmad	12-08-2013 to 21-06-2018
Mohammad Sheheryar Sultan	21-06-2018 to 16-09-2019
Tahir Khurshid	16-09-2019 to 29-11-2019
Capt. (Retd.) Asad Ullah Khan	29-11-2019 to 18-05-2022
Mujahid Sherdil	18-05-2022 to 22-12-2022
Ahmed Mustajab Karamat	23-12-2022 to 12-01-2023
Muhammad Asif Balal Lodhi	12-01-2023 to 25-01-2023
Humera Ikram (Addl. Charge)	25-01-2023 to 06-02-2023
Lt. (Retd.) Sohail Ashraf	06-02-2023 to 02-04-2026
Raja Jahangir Anwar	08-04-2026 to Date

== See also ==
- Ministry of Communications
- Transport in Pakistan
