= Gajju Matta =

Residential neighborhood in Lahore, Pakistan

Coordinates: 31°23′N 74°22′E

Gajju Matta گجُو متا
- Neighbourhood
- Interactive map of Gajju Matta گجُو متا
- Country: Pakistan
- Province: Punjab
- City: Lahore
- Tehsil: Nishter
- Union councils: 6, 7

Gajju Matta (Urdu, Punjabi: گجُو متا) is a neighbourhood located in Nishter Tehsil of Lahore, Punjab, Pakistan. It is the location of Gajjumata Metrobus Terminal Station, which serves as the southern terminus of the Lahore Metrobus.
