= Chauburji =

Mughal era monument in Lahore

Chauburji (Lahore)
- چو برجی
- Interactive map of Chauburji (Lahore)
- Location: Lahore, Punjab, Pakistan
- Coordinates: 31.5540°N 74.3048°E
- Completion date: 1646 C.E.

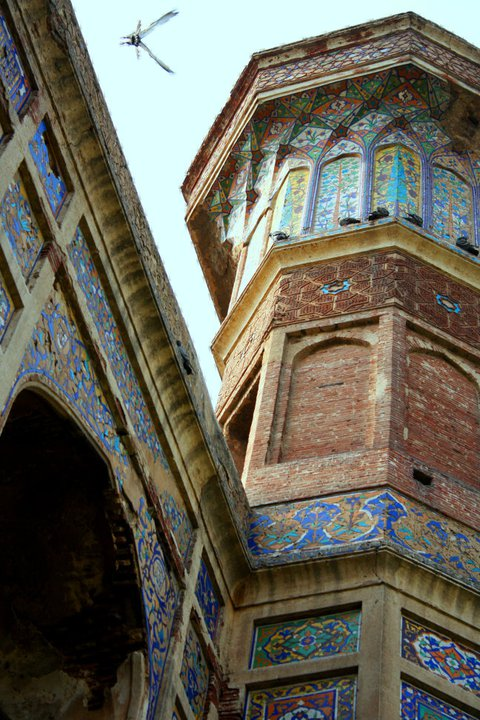
Chauburji's exterior still has some intricate kashi-kari, or Persian-style tile work.

Chauburji (Punjabi and Urdu: چو برجی, lit. 'four towers') is a Mughal era monument in the city of Lahore, capital of the Pakistani province of Punjab. The monument was built in 1646 C.E. during the reign of the emperor Shah Jahan. It previously acted as a gateway to a large garden.

== Overview ==
Chauburji is located on Lahore's Multan Road at the intersection of Bahawalpur Road, which leads southwards to Multan, and was the gateway to an extensive garden known to have existed in Mughal times. The name "Chauburji," which translates as "four towers" was likely given by later generations, as the original site was seen as a monumental gateway to an extensive garden in the Mughal Empire period. It is said that the attached garden might not have survived due to river flooding the area.

== History ==
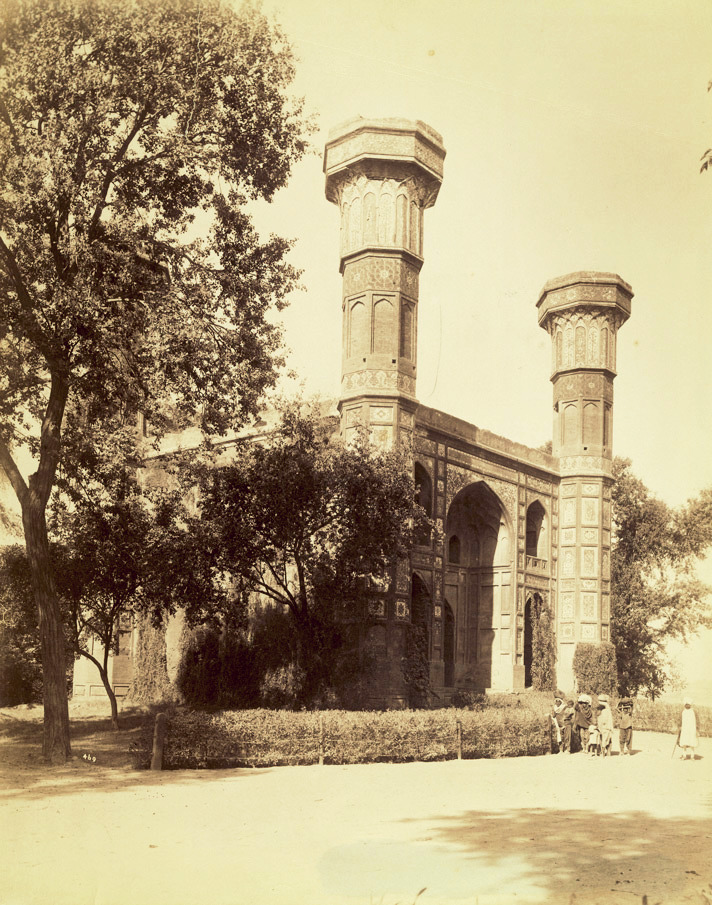
Chauburji in the 1880s

The establishment of this garden is often attributed to Mughal Princess Zeb-un-Nisa, who is believed to be referenced in an inscription naming her "Sahib-e-Zebinda Begam-e-Dauran." The princess was eight years old at the time of construction, so it has been suggested that the inscription may actually be in reference to her aunt, Jahanara Begum, who was a daughter of the Mughal Emperor Shah Jahan.

=== Lost Mughal garden ===
The garden for which Chauburji acted as a gateway no longer exists, and the structure is now located in a grassy roundabout at the busy intersection of Lahore's Multan Road, and Bahawalpur Road. The Mughal garden is believed to have extended from Nawankot in the south, and extending towards Lahore city.

Flooding from the Ravi River is believed to have destroyed most of the garden during the reign of Emperor Aurangzeb. No traces of the once expansive garden survive aside from the Chauburji gate.

=== 1960s renovation ===
During a severe earthquake in 1846, the north-western minaret collapsed and cracks appeared in the central arch. This has however been restored as much as was reasonably possible and the gateway now looks quite as it might have during the time of its Mughal patroness. The restoration was carried out by the Department of Archeology, Government of Pakistan in the late 1960s.

=== Impact of Metro construction ===
The Chauburji monument is situated along the route of the Orange Line of the Lahore Metro. Heritage campaigners submitted a petition to the Lahore High Court as the planned metro line will pass close to Chauburji, Shalimar Gardens, and nine other sites in the city in violation of the Punjab Special Premises Ordinance, 1985 and Antiquity Act, 1975. In August 2016, the Court halted construction of the metro within 200 feet of any heritage site, including Chauburji in order to prevent what UNESCO termed as potentially "irreversible damage", were the line to be constructed in its present form. The Chauburji station was originally planned to be underground, but it was changed to an elevated station to comply with the UNESCO regulations.

== Architecture ==
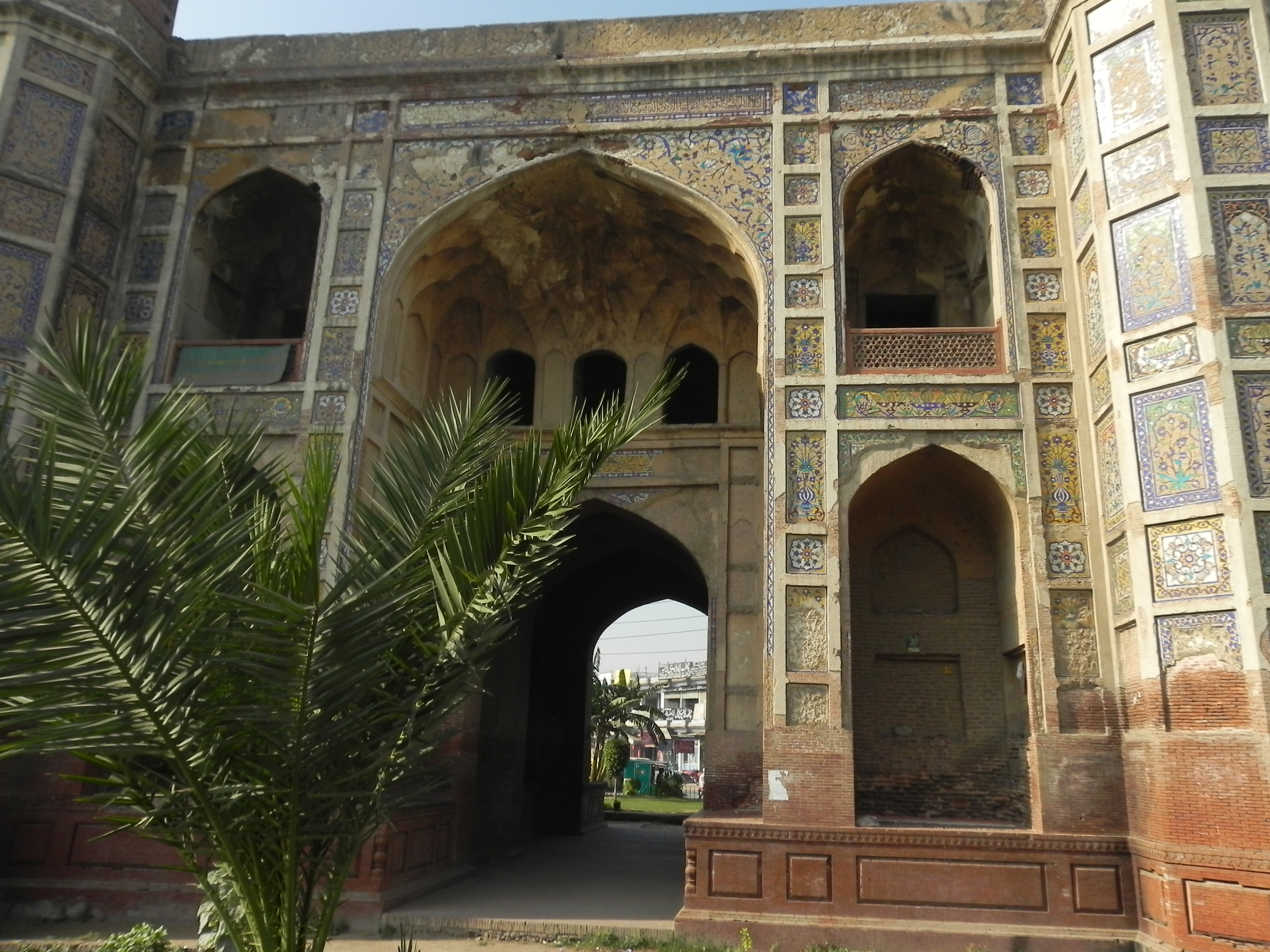
A view of Chauburji's iwans

Chauburji is built in a syncretic style that blends Mughal architecture, the older Timurid-style from Central Asia, and Perso-Arabic styles from the Middle East. Its distinguishing features are the minarets which greatly widen at the top - a unique feature not present anywhere in the sub-continent. Some, however, believe that there were cupolas upon these minarets which collapsed with the passage of time.

The eastern and western facades of the structure are decorated by two-storey Timurid-style iwans flanked by two levels of alcoves in a style typical of the Shah Jehan period of Mughal architecture. The building was once covered in intricate blue and green kashi kari (or Kashan-style) tile work and frescoes. The 'aiwans' are embellished with muqarnas, which were first introduced into the Mughal Empire from Persia with construction of Lahore's Wazir Khan Mosque.

The building's red brickwork is typical of the Muslim buildings of the sub-continent; the doorways and windows running through the interior corridors are examples of the living style that characterised Mughal structures. Although most of the inscriptions on Chauburjia have been lost, on the upper-most part of the construction Ayat-ul-Kursi can be seen in Arabic script in blue and worked in porcelain.

It has been suggested that the Charminar of Hyderabad, India influenced the architecture of Chauburji.

== Conservation ==
Chauburji is listed on the Protected Heritage Monuments of the Archaeology Department of Punjab.

== Gallery ==
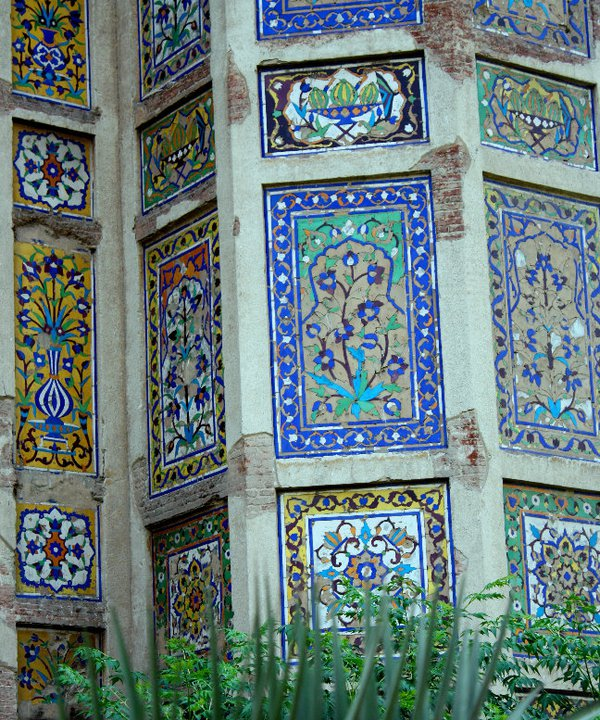
An example of Chauburji's Persian-style tilework.

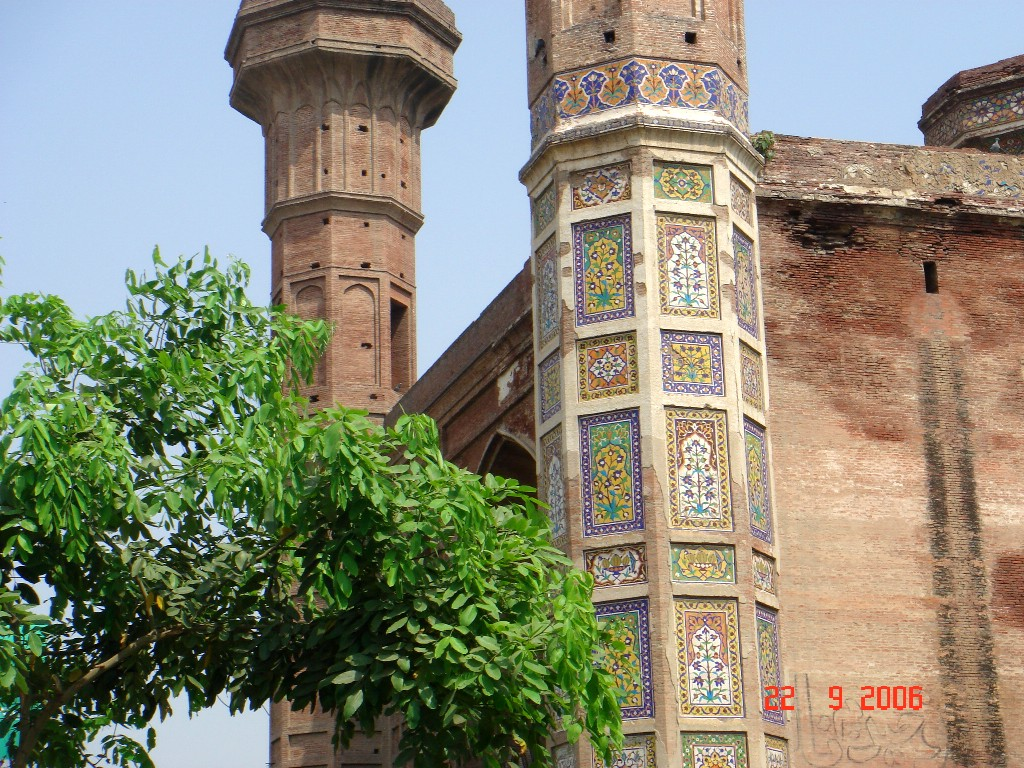
Embellishments on the Chauburji minaret

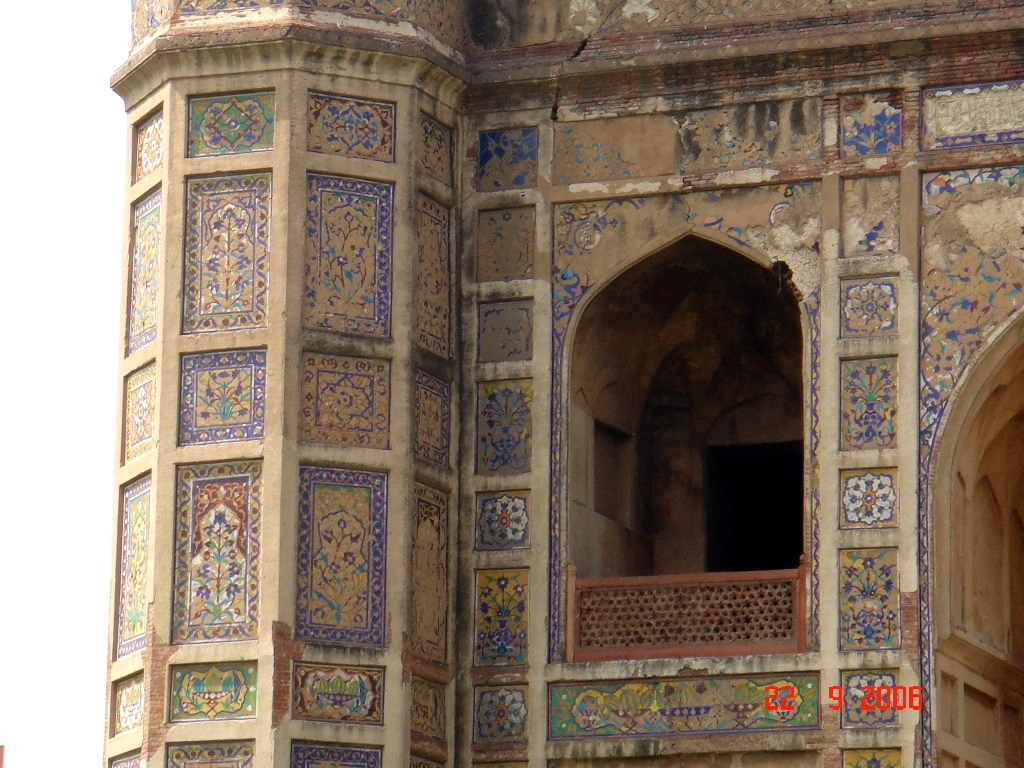
Detail on Chauburji minaret

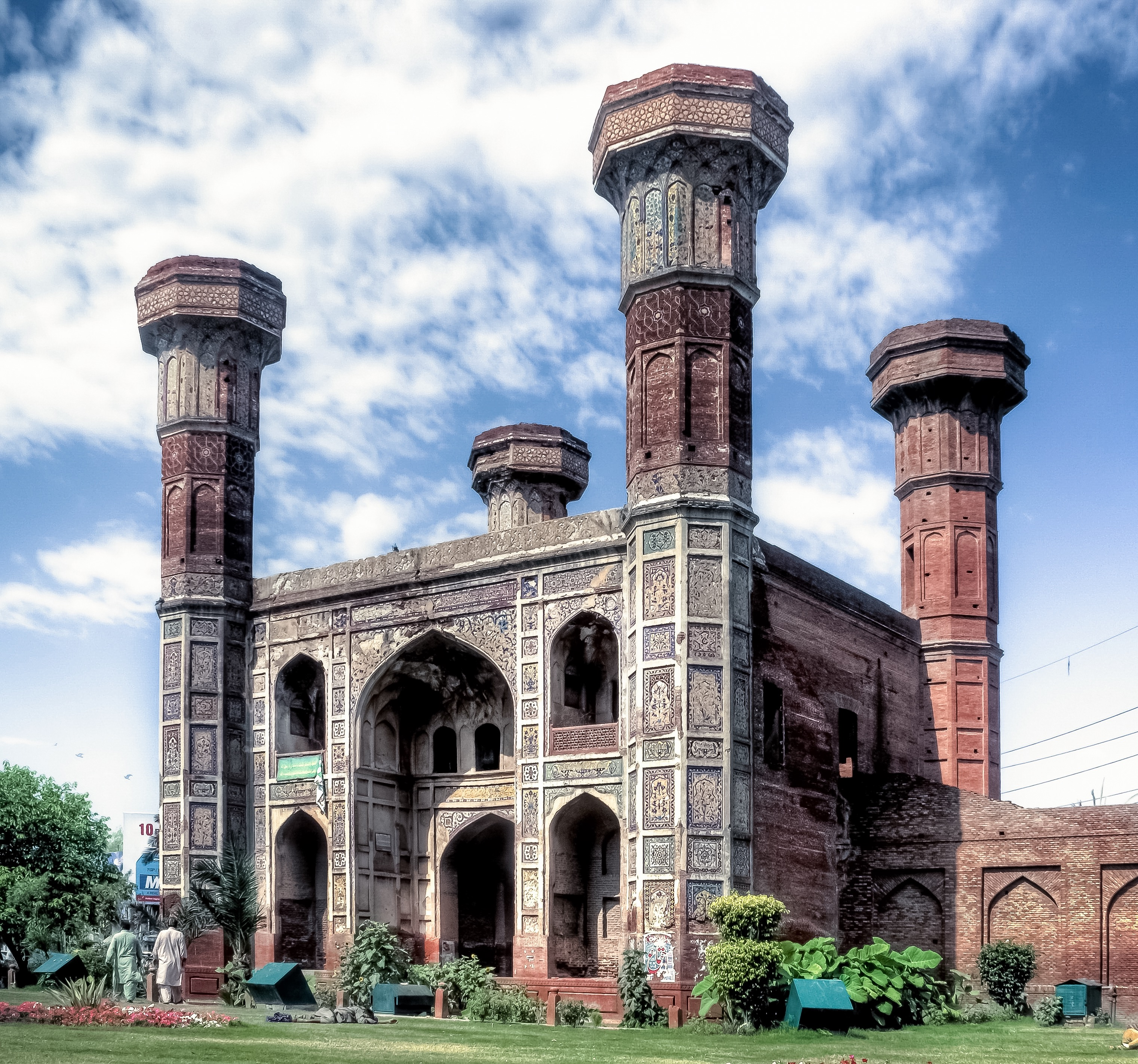
A view of the monument

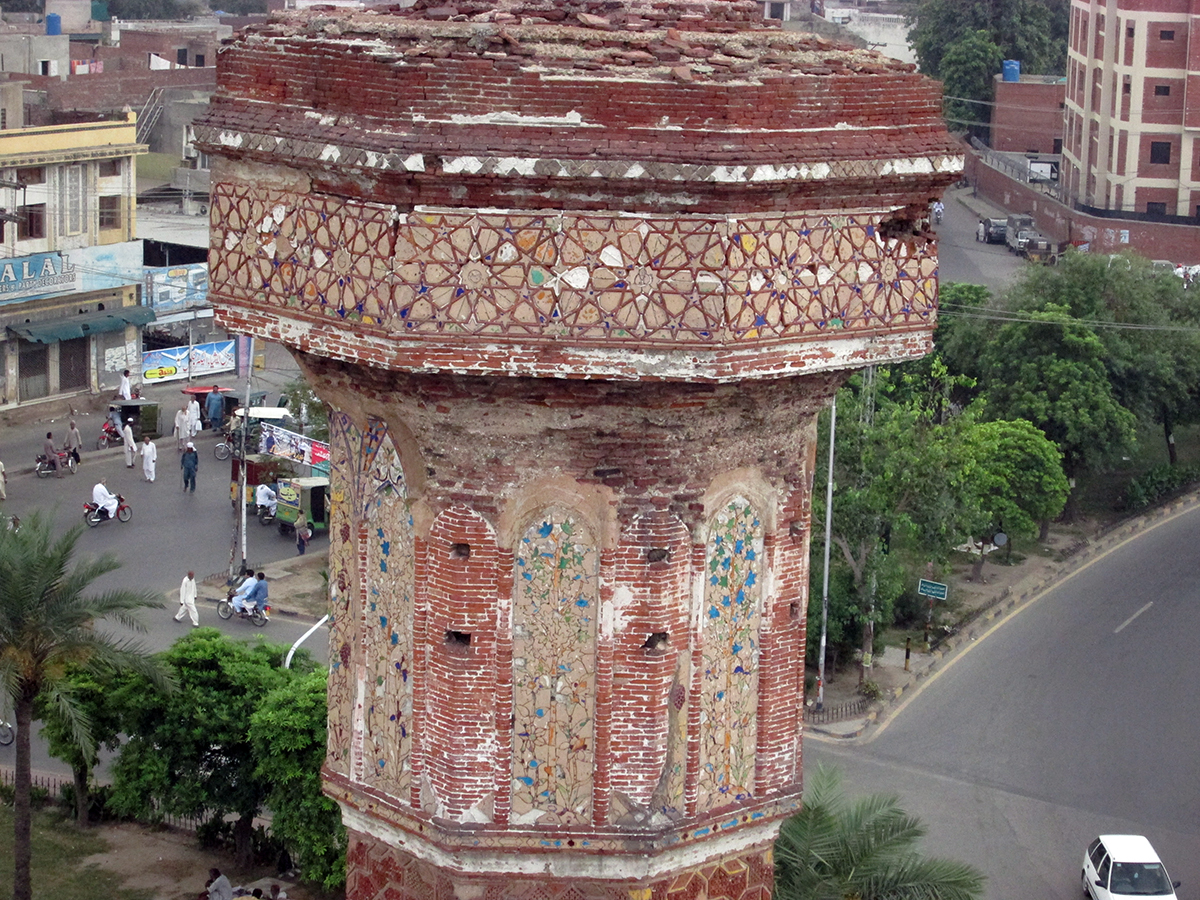
A view of Chauburji's minarets with tile work

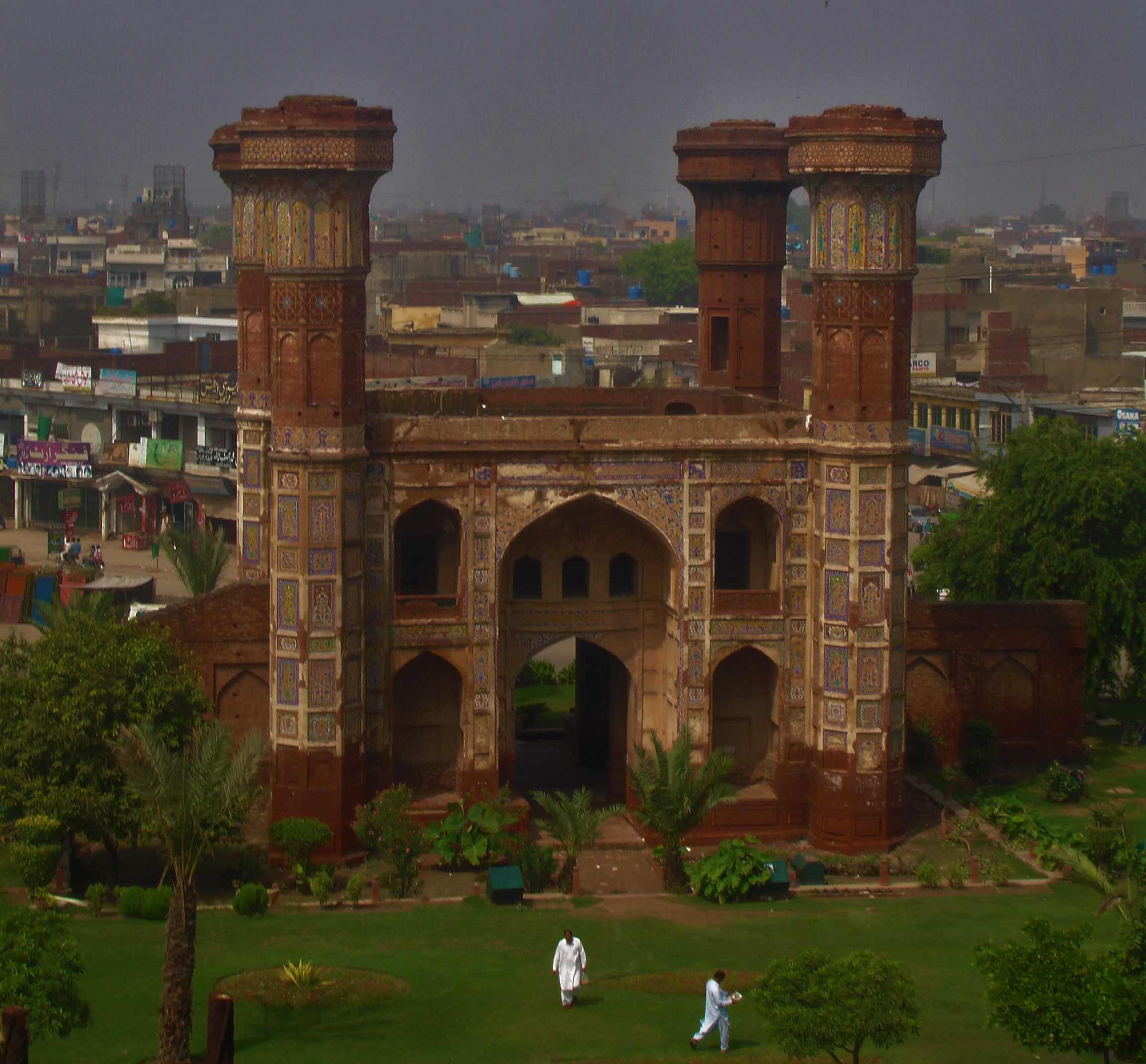
Lahore after rainfall

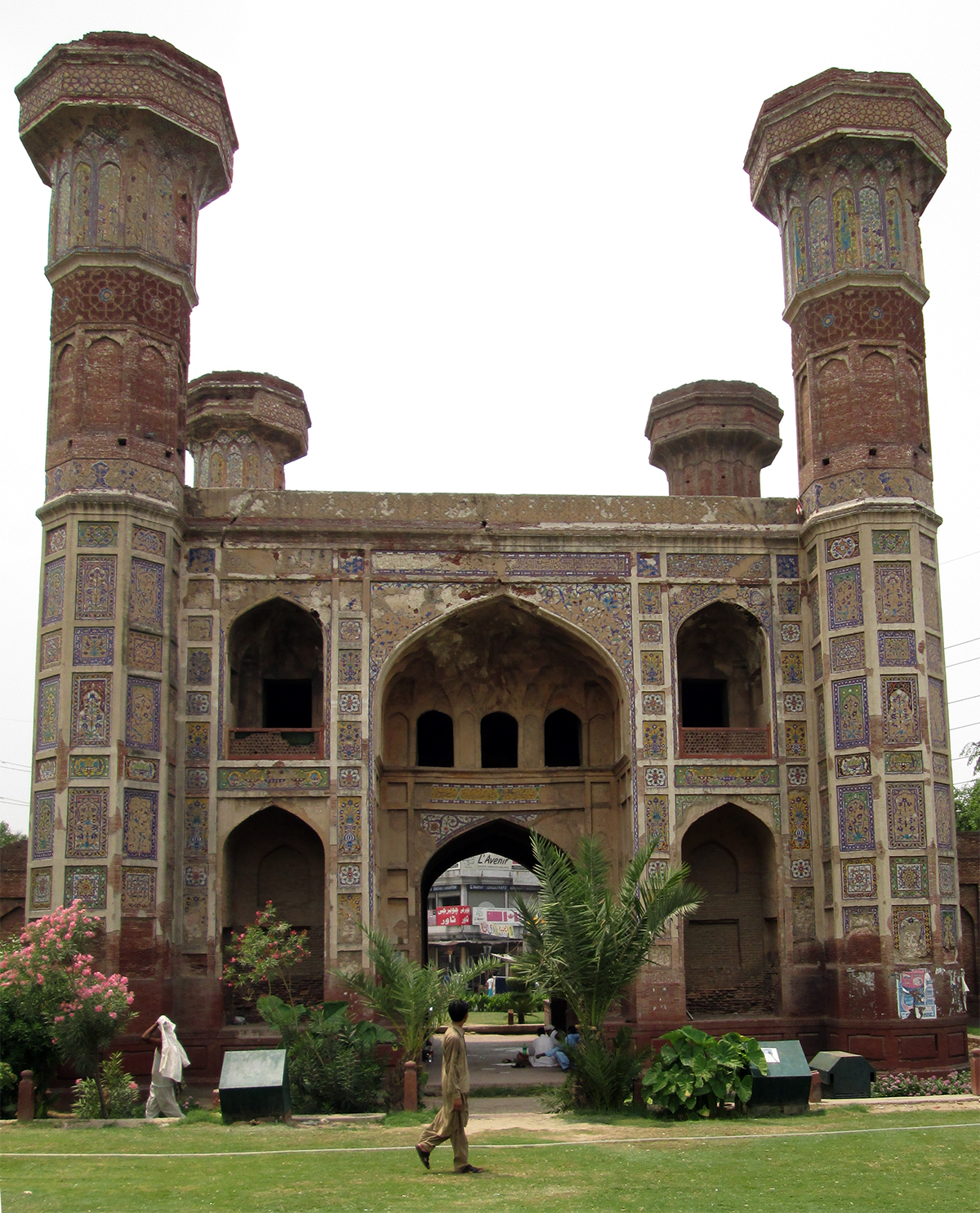
View of Chauburji

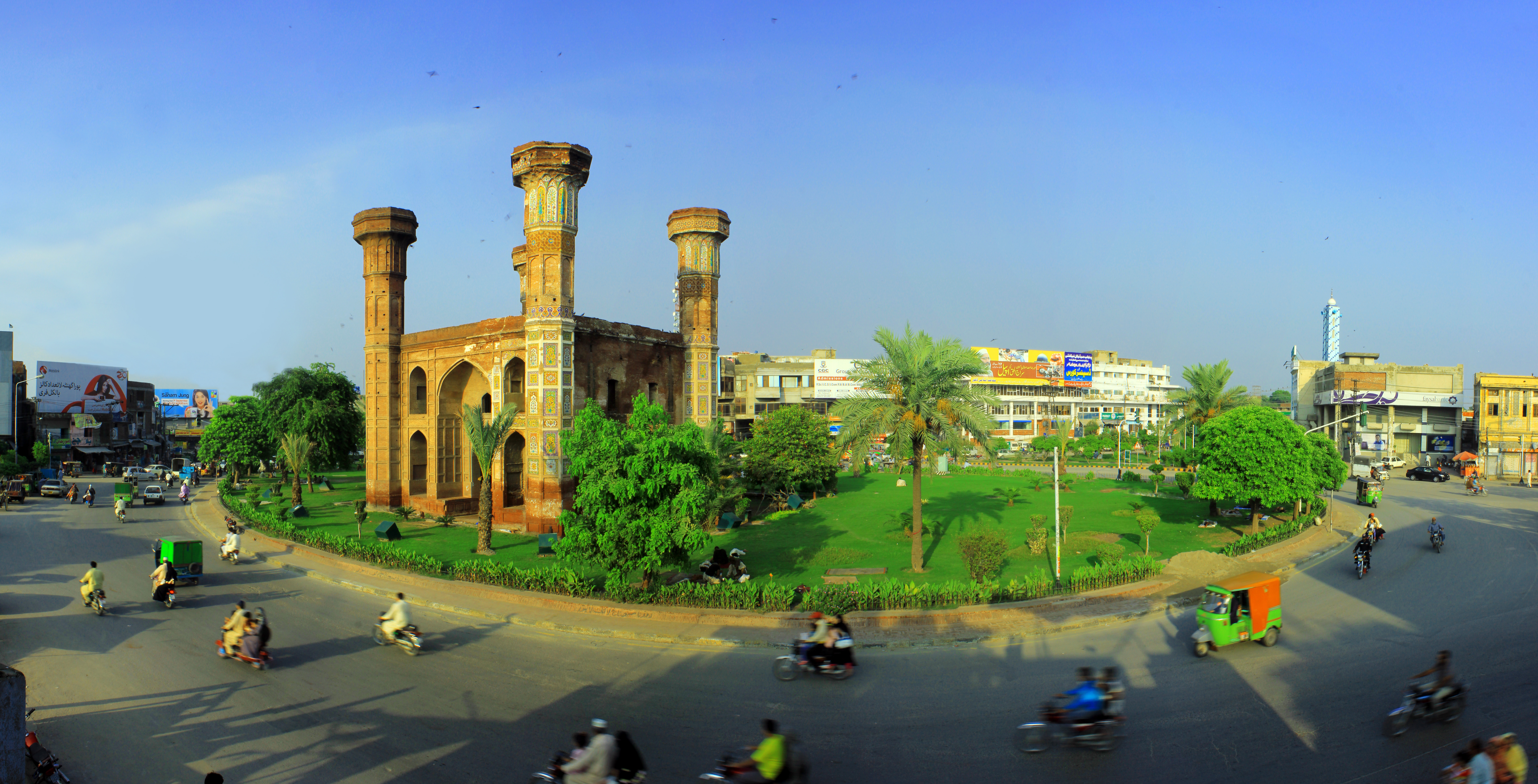
Chauburji roundabout in 2014

== See also ==
- Islamic architecture
- Char Minar
