= Orange Line (Lahore Metro) =

Lahore Metro line

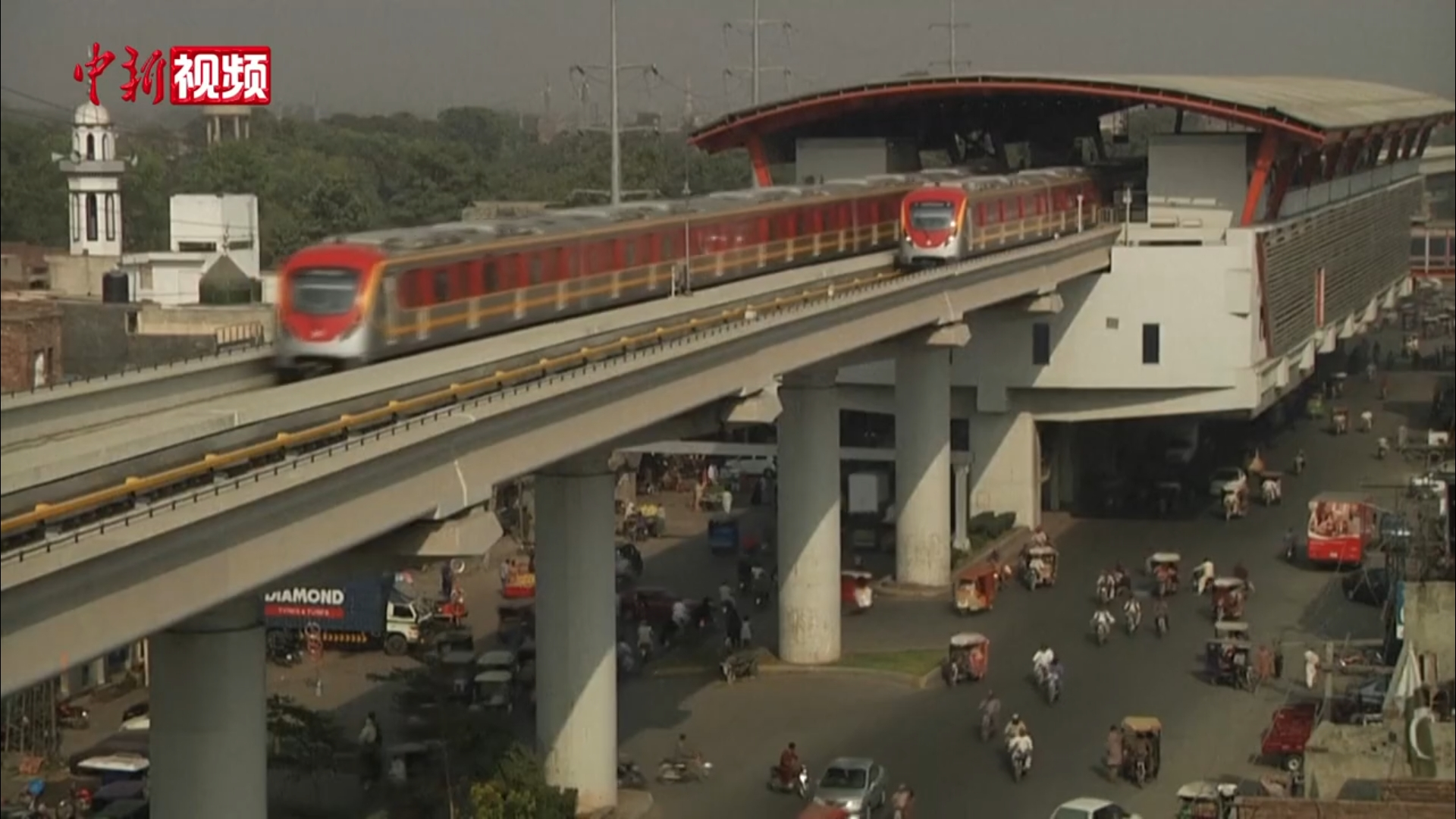

Overview
- Status: Operational
- Locale: Lahore, Punjab, Pakistan
- Termini: Ali Town Terminal; Dera Gujran Terminal
- Stations: 26 (24 elevated, 2 underground)

Service
- Type: Rapid transit
- System: Lahore Metro
- Operator: Punjab Mass Transit Authority
- Rolling stock: 27 5-cars trains

History
- Opened: 25 October 2020; 5 years ago

Technical
- Line length: 27.1 km (16.8 mi)
- Character: Elevated & underground
- Track gauge: 1,435 mm (4 ft 8 1/2 in) standard gauge
- Electrification: Third rail 750 V DC
- Operating speed: 80 km/h (50 mph)

Route map

Orange Line is an automated rapid transit line in Lahore, Punjab, Pakistan, Pakistan and the first driverless metro in Pakistan. It is operated by the Punjab Mass Transit Authority and forms part of the Lahore Metro system. The line is Pakistan's first metro train. The line spans 27.1 km (16.8 mi) with 25.4 km (15.8 mi) elevated and 1.72 km (1.1 mi) underground. The line is served by 26 stations and is expected to handle 250,000 passengers daily.

== History ==
The project was initiated with a signed memorandum of understanding between the governments of Pakistan and China in May 2014. Financing for the project was secured in December 2015 when China's Exim Bank agreed to provide a soft loan of $1.55 billion for the project. Construction works on the project began in October 2015. Habib Construction Services was awarded the first phase in October 2015 for Rs. 21.49 billion (US$77 million). In October 2016, Phase 2 of the project was awarded to ZKB Engineers and Constructors for civil works between Chauburji and Ali Town at a cost of Rs. 200.39 billion. On 12 January 2017, 7 labourers perished at a makeshift residence for Orange Line construction workers. CRRC Zhuzhou Locomotive rolled out the first of 27 trains for the metro on 16 May 2017.

Testing and trial runs began in March 2018. In May 2018, Punjab Chief Minister of the time Shahbaz Sharif was present at the first test run of Lahore's Orange Line Metro Train (OLMT).

On 25 October 2020, Orange Line Train was inaugurated by then Chief Minister Punjab Sardar Usman Buzdar.

== Design ==
=== Stations ===
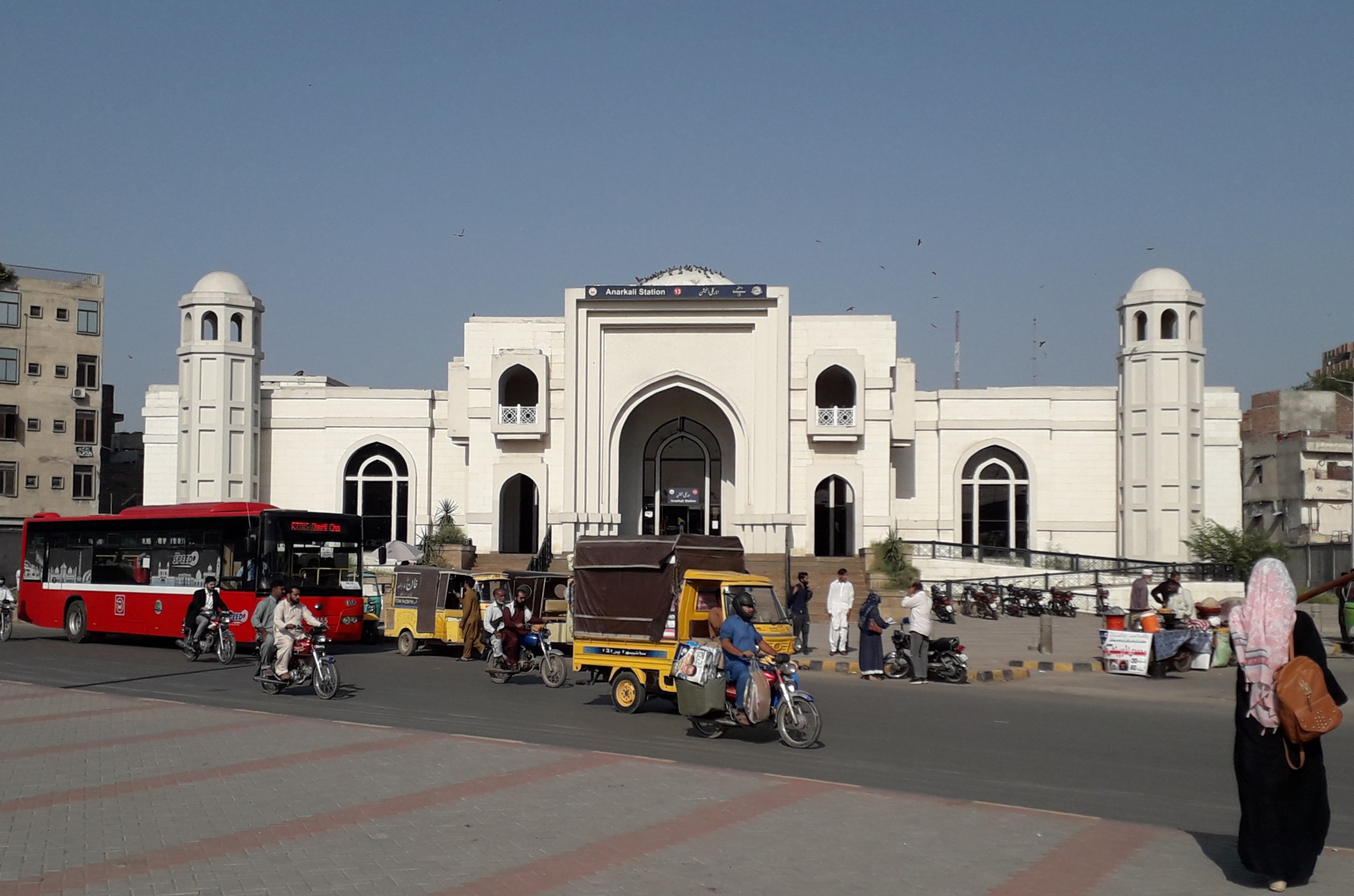
Anarkali is one of the 2 underground stations

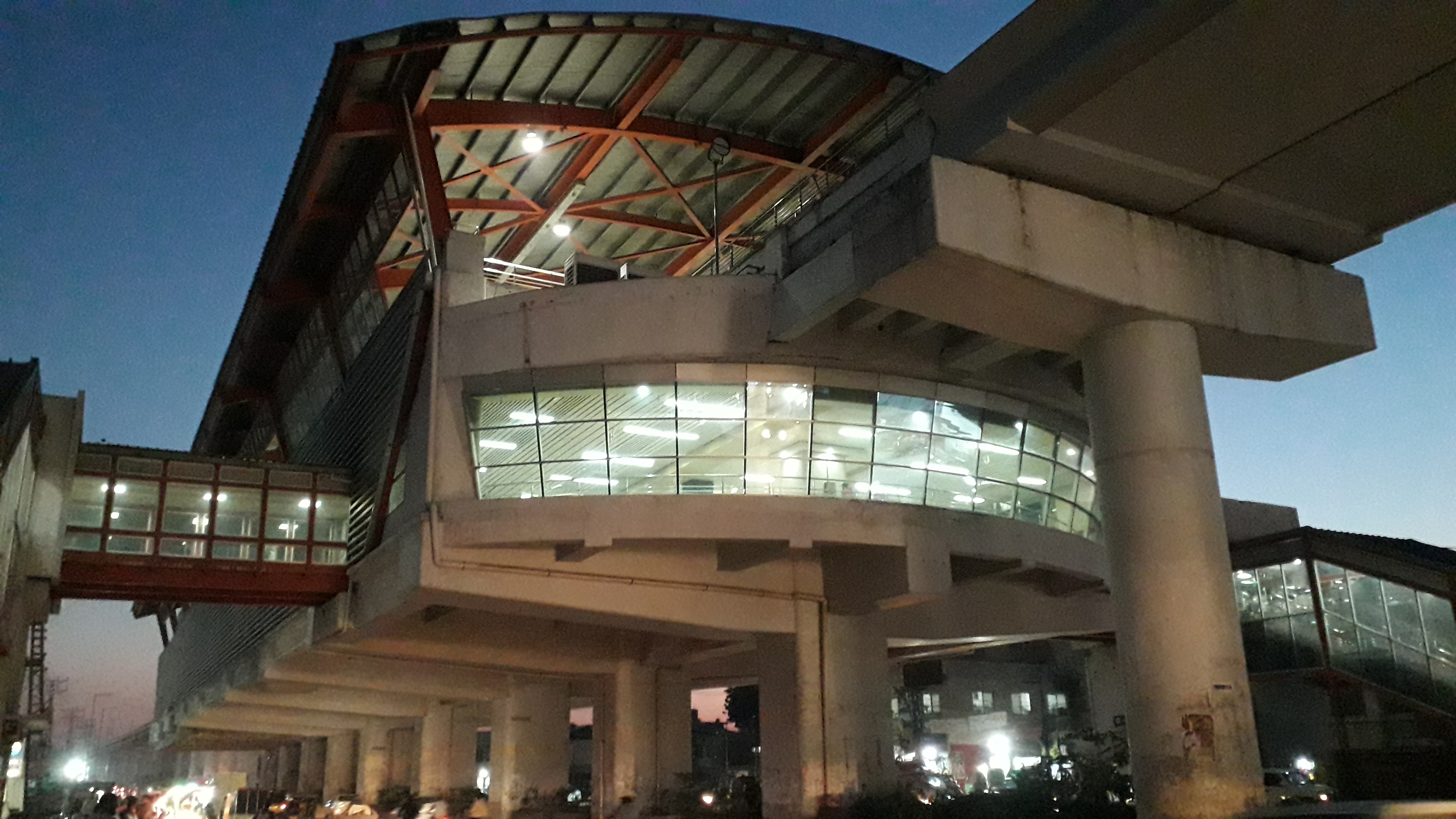
Wahdat Road Station

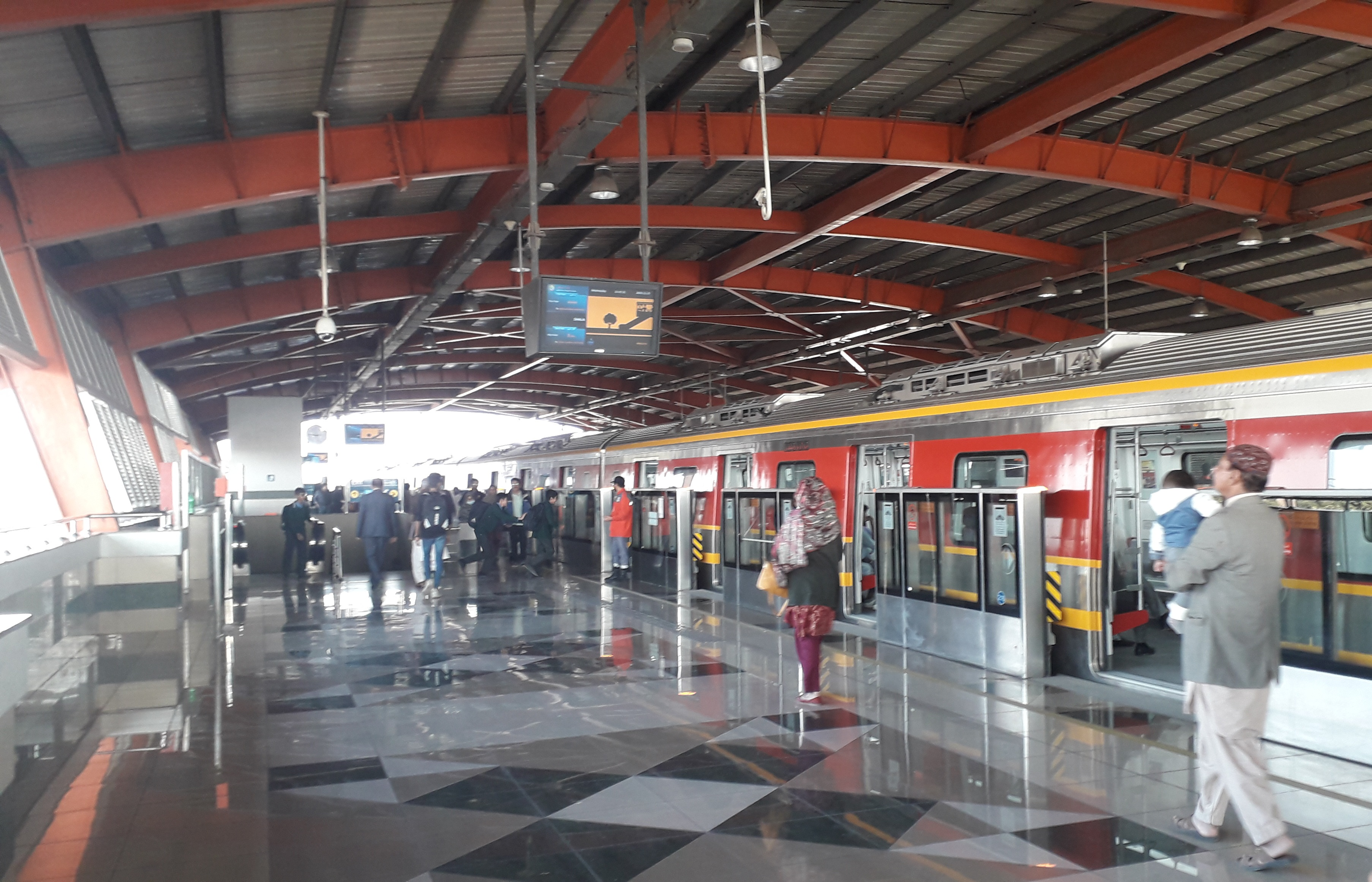
Certain Orange Line station from the inside

The line has 26 stations. Anarkali and GPO stations are underground, while the remaining 24 are elevated. The rail line runs through the centre of each station, with platforms flanking the track. Elevated stations have a width of 22.5 metres, while Anarkali Station is 16 metres wide, and GPO Station is 49.5 metres wide. Elevated stations are all 102 metres long, while Anarkali and GPO Stations are 121.5 and 161.6 metres long, respectively.

Anarkali and GPO Stations were initially planned to have two underground levels, Anarkali Station now both feature a ground-level concourse with one underground level, while GPO Station has a single underground level, in order reduce the maximum gradient for trains from 3.5% to 3.0%. Rail tracks are 9.7m below street level at GPO Station, and 8.7m below street level at Anarkali Station.

Underground stations feature automated doors between platforms and trains. Public areas of the station are air conditioned during warm months. Elevated stations feature natural ventilation throughout the platforms, with localised air conditioning in public areas of the ticket-hall level.

=== Rolling stock ===
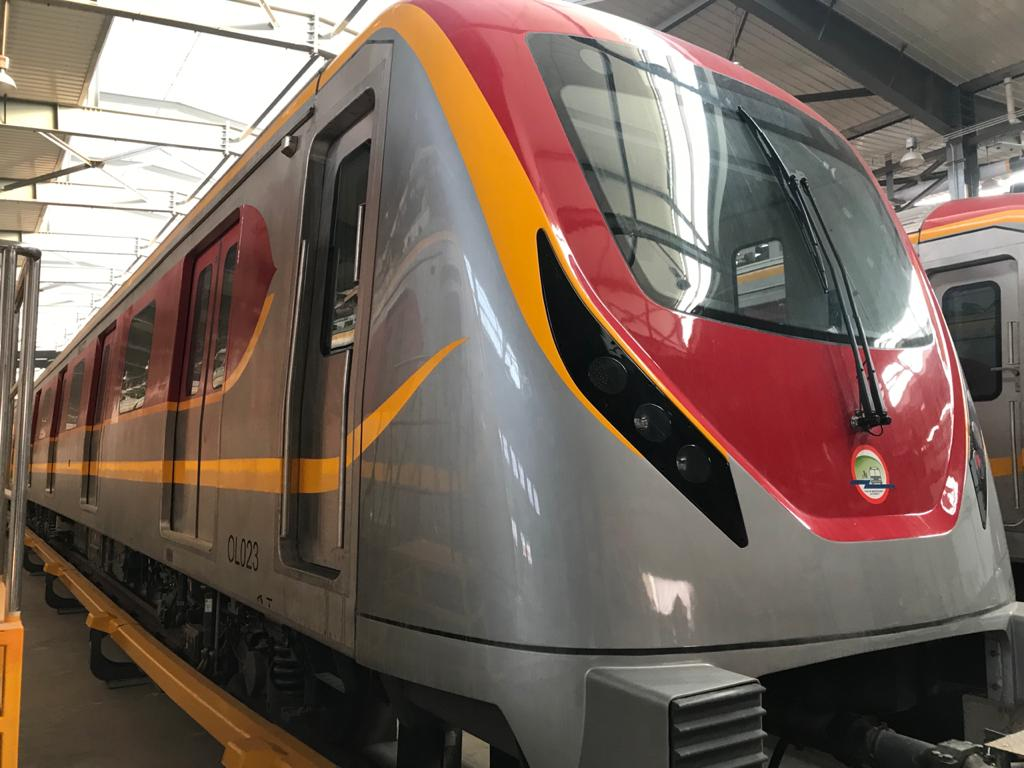
The locomotive

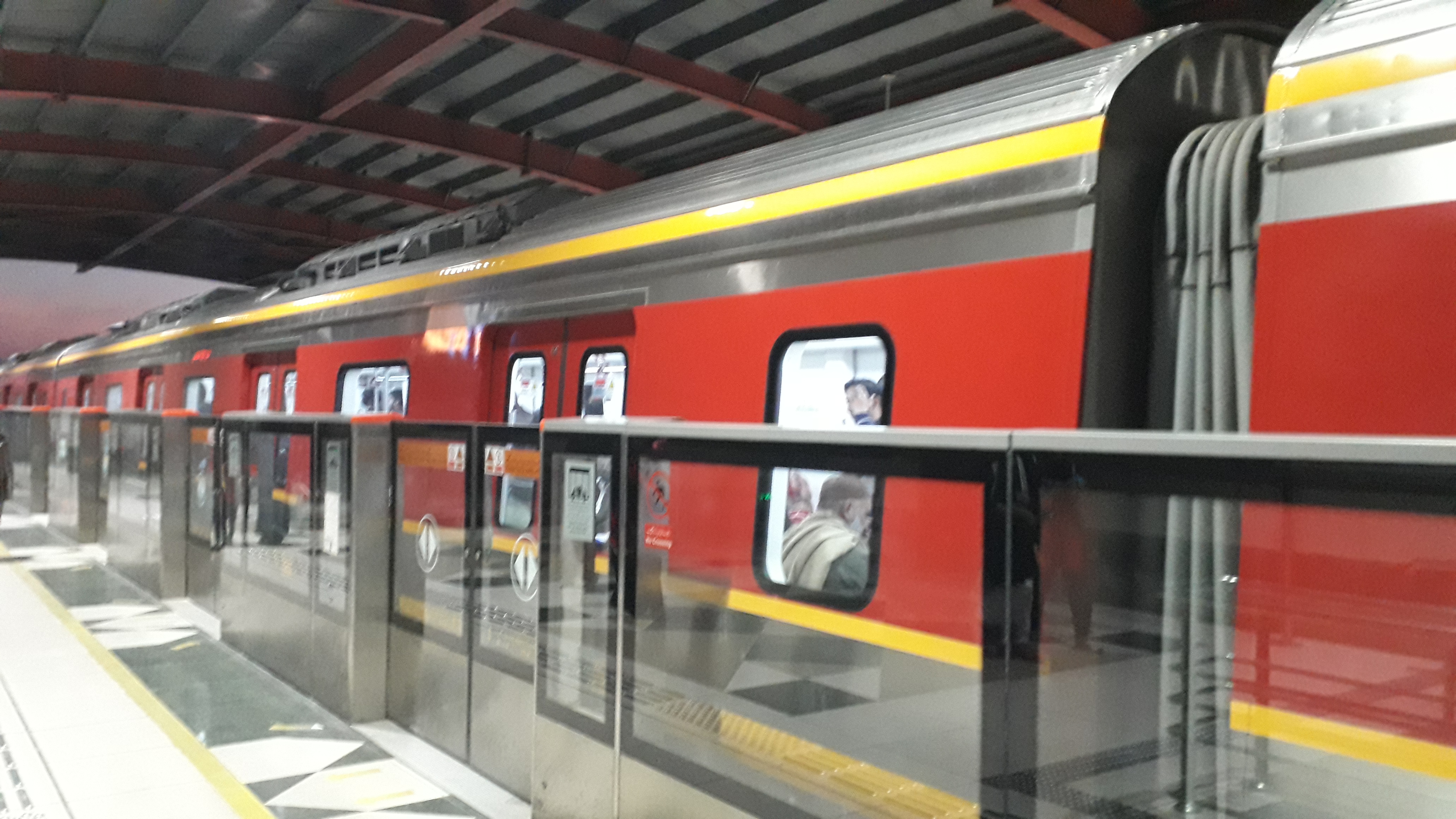
Train at a station

Orange Line trains are each composed of five wagons manufactured by China's CRRC Zhuzhou Locomotive, and automated and driverless. A standard Chinese "Type B" train-set consisting of 5 cars with 4 doors each used, that has a stainless steel body and illuminated by LED lighting. Each car has a nominal capacity of 200 seated and standing passengers at an average density of 5 persons per square metre with 20% of passengers seated and 80% standing. A total of 27 trains with 135 cars have been ordered for the system, at a cost of $1 billion. A total of 54 trains are expected to be in service by 2025. The trains powered by a 750-volt third rail.

=== Track ===
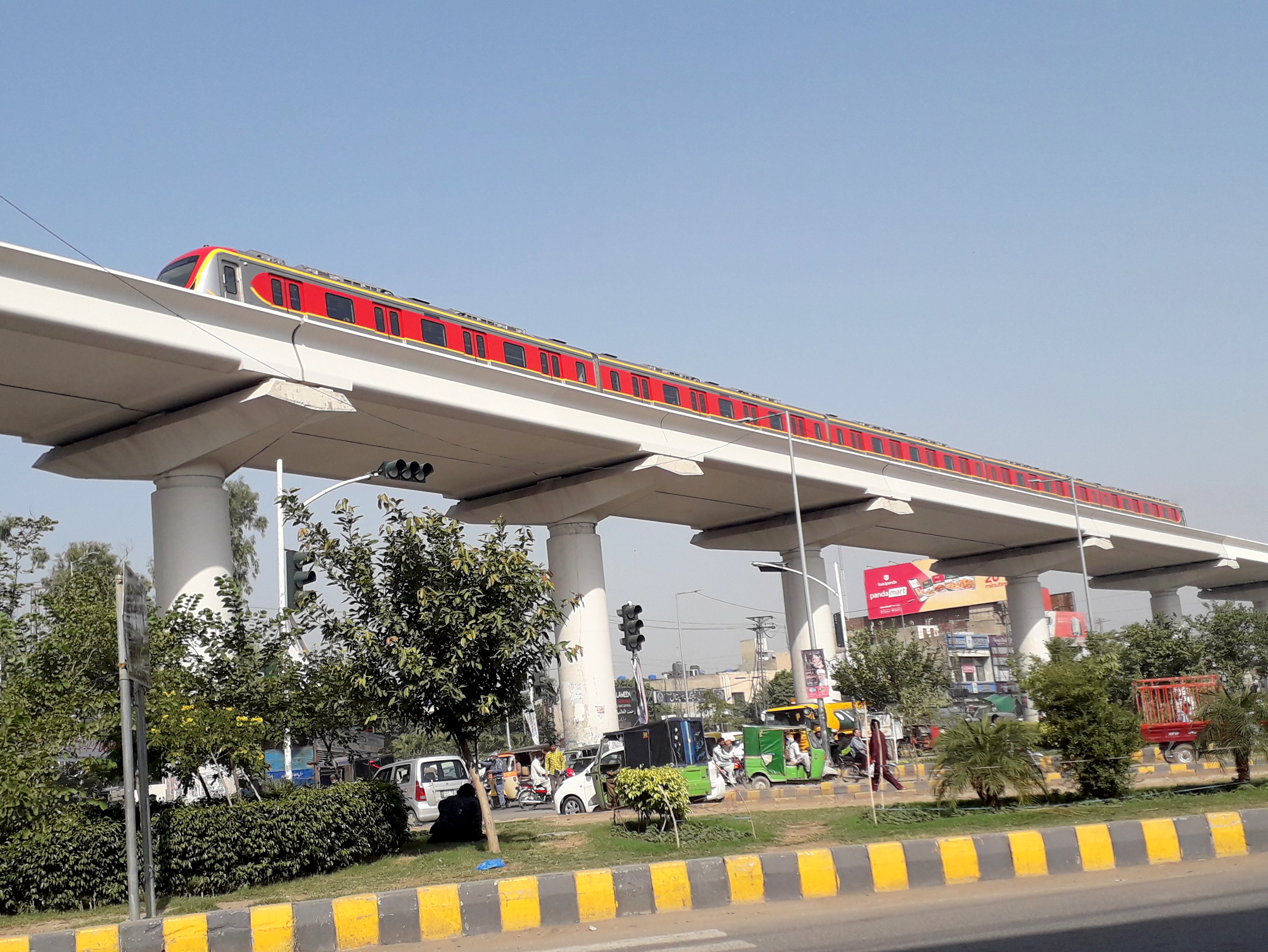
Locomotive on elevated tracks

The Orange Line's tracks meet China's national standards, and employing jointless track circuits. Mainline track is capable of supporting 60 kg/m, while track in the depot and storage yards is capable of supporting 50 kg/m. Track was laid upon a monolithic concrete track bed, with crossovers located between every 2 to 3 stations. Double turnover tracks are used at each terminus for turnaround. Track is standard gauge at 1435mm. Fasteners between tracks are elastic.

=== Depot ===
A depot was constructed at the northeast portion of the line, directly east of the Lahore Ring Road, while a stabling yard was constructed at the line's southern terminus at Ali Town. The depot is also the site of the Orange Line's central control centre. The depot and stabling yard respectively required 0.56 and 0.49 kilometres of track.

== Alignment ==
The line spans 27.1 km (16.8 mi). 1.72 km (1.1 mi) of the line is underground, while transition zones between underground and elevated portions covers 0.7 km (0.4 mi). The remaining track is elevated. The maximum gradient for the track's main-line is 3.0%, while the minimum turning radius on the mainline is 250 metres.

The alignment roughly parallels several of Lahore's major thoroughfares, including the Grand Trunk Road, McLeod Road, Lake Road, Multan Road and Raiwind Road. The Orange Line connects several important nodes in Lahore, including the Shalamar Gardens, University of Engineering and Technology, Lahore's main train station, Chauburji Square, and Ali Town.

== Route ==
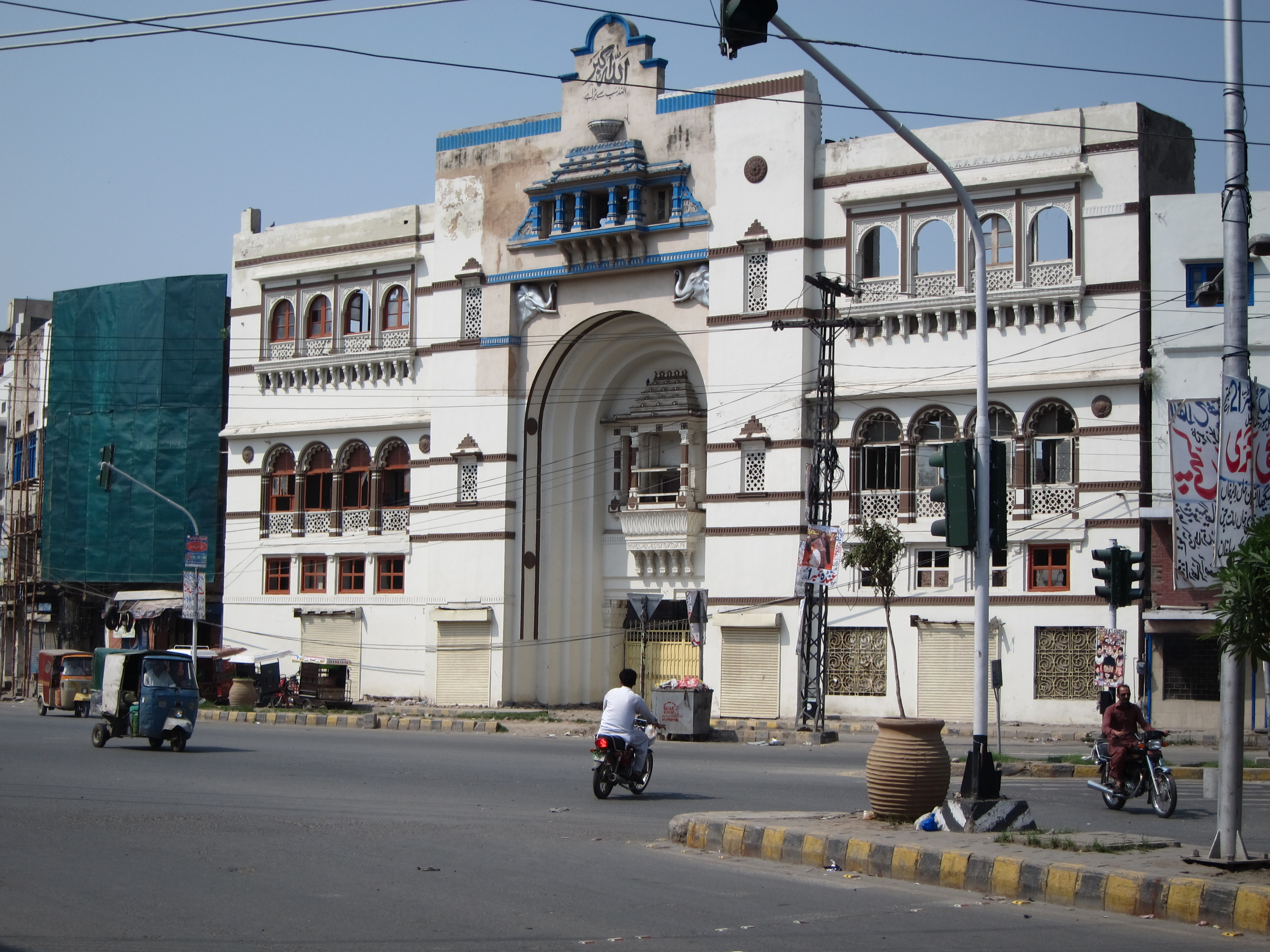
Lakshmi Station is named after the historic Lakshmi Building, which in turn was named in honour of the Hindu goddess of fortune and prosperity, Lakshmi.

From Orange Line's northeastern terminus at Dera Gujran, the track is elevated and runs in the median of the GT Road until Shalamar Station. From Dera Gujran Station in northeast Lahore, the route travels 5.5 kilometres westward with stations at Islam Park, Salamatpura, Mahmood Booti, Pakistan Mint, and Shalamar Gardens. The track does not run in the GT Road's median near Shalamar Station - it instead turns and travels along the southern edge of the GT Road in order to bypass the garden in order to prevent damage to mature trees there. Traveling west from Shalamar Station, the track returns to the median of GT Road, with stops at Baghbanpura, University of Engineering and Technology, and Sultanpura. From Sultanpura, the line then travel towards Lahore's central Junction Railway Station. From there, it travels southwest along McLeod road towards Lakshmi Chowk Station. The total distance from Sultanpura to Lakshmi Chowk is 2.5 km.

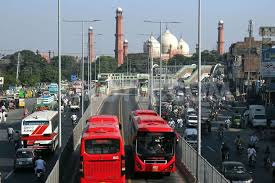
Passengers from the Orange Line will be able to use Anarkali Station to transfer to the Lahore Metrobus stop at MAO College.

Leaving Lakshmi Chowk, the line travels southwest along McLeod Road, and descends into the 1.15 km underground portion that leads to the first underground station in the system, the GPO Station. GPO Station is located at the intersection of The Mall and McLeod Road, in front of Lahore's General Post Office (GPO) and the Lahore High Court. From GPO Station, the line continues from McLeod Road and travels under Allah Baksh Road before turning south where the second underground station, Anarkali, is located. Connections from the Orange Line to the Lahore Metrobus will be available via an underground walkway in future. From Anarkali Station, the route continues under Jain Mandir and Lytton Road.

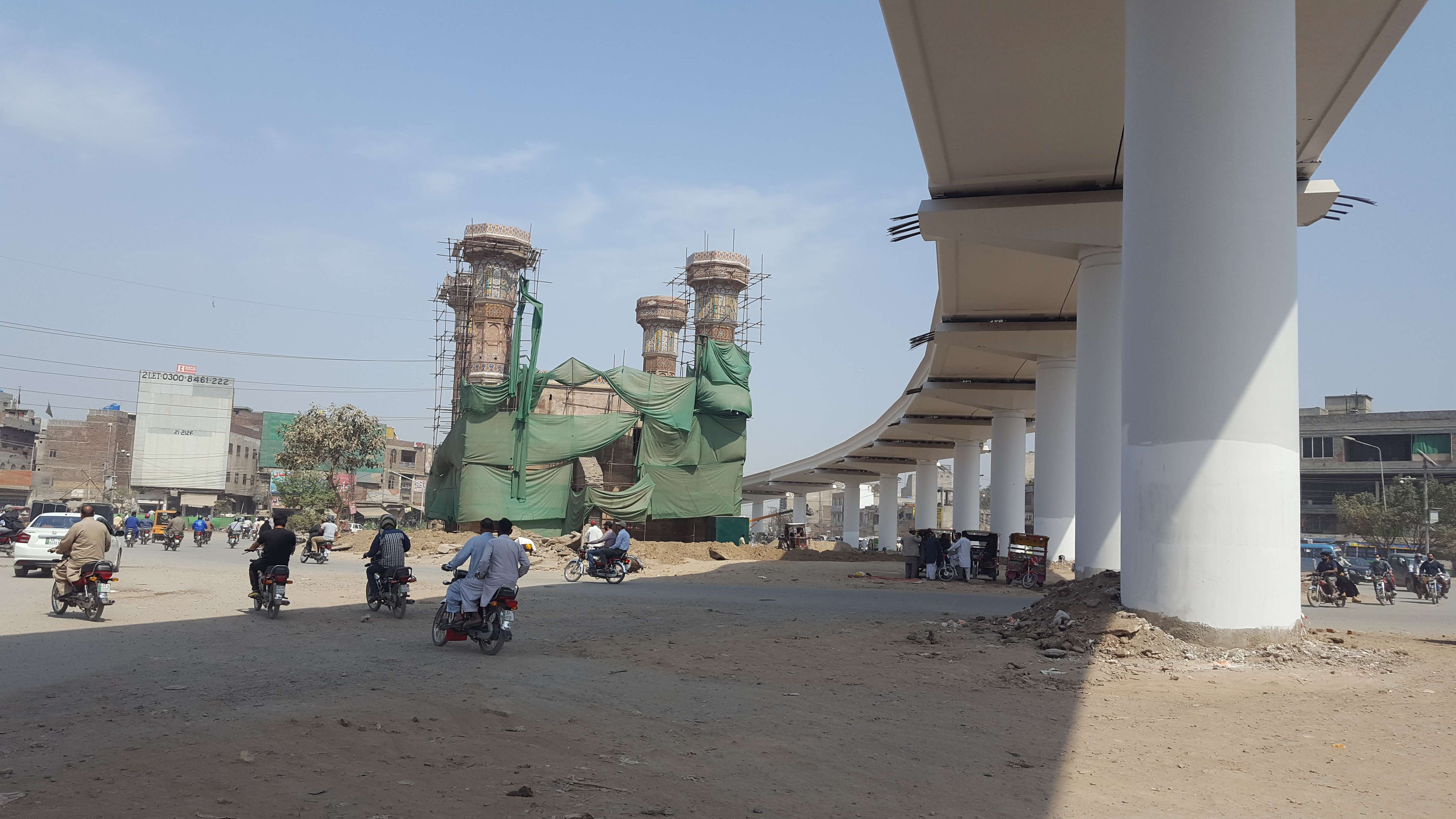
Chauburji perpendicular to Orange line tracks.

It then emerges along Lake Road and again travels above ground towards Chauburji Station.

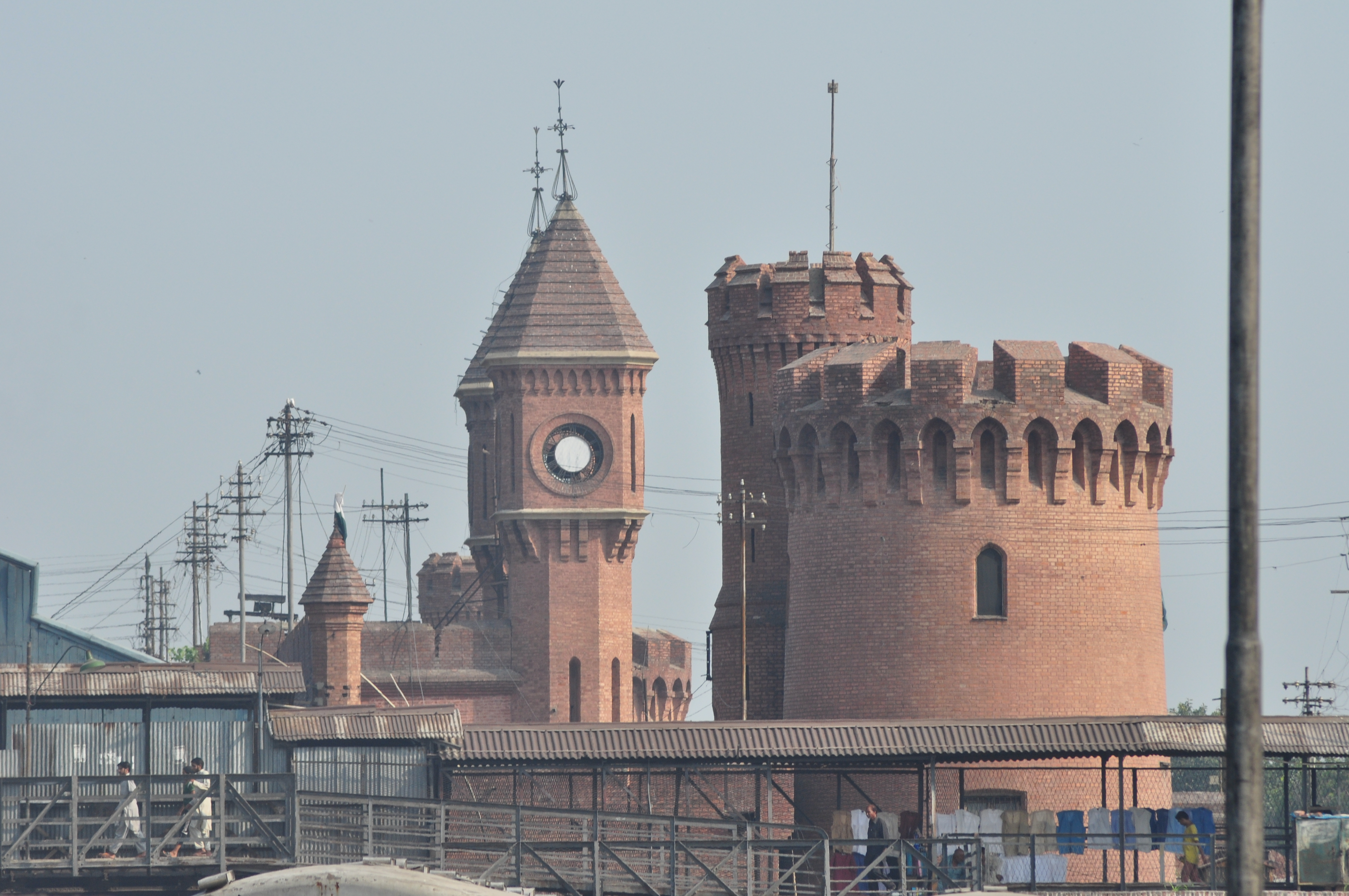
The Orange Line will include connections to the historic Lahore Railway Station.

From Chauburji the line continues 4.5 km towards the southwest, along the median of Multan Road. Elevated stations are located at Gulshan-e-Ravi, Samanabad, Bund Road, Salahudin Road, and Khatam-e-Nabuwat. From Khatam-e-Nabuwat, the line shifts from Multan Road's median and travels along the road's southern/eastern side with a stop at Sabzazar Station. The line continues along Multan Road's edge until Awan Road Station, after which it reverts to Multan Road's median. Leaving Awan Road Station, the line continues to travel southwest along Multan Road until it reaches Wahdat Road Station, which lies 2.85 km to the southwest of Sabzazar Station. The line 5.2 kilometres along Multan and Raiwind Roads, with stops at Hanjarwal Station, Canal View, Thokar Niaz Baig, before terminating at Ali Town.

=== Connections ===
The Orange line connects to the Lahore Metrobus from Anarkali Station of the Orange Line, to MAO College Station of the Metrobus. The line connects to the Lahore Railway Station via a moving walkway to the Orange Line's Railway Station.

== Operations ==
The Orange Line is operated by a joint venture of Guangzhou Metro Group, Norinco International and Daewoo Express for the first 8 years after the project's completion. Infrastructure for the line has an expected life span of approximately 100 years with routine maintenance. The official in charge is Sibtain Halim.

=== Projected ridership ===
The system is designed to handle 30,000 passengers per hour. The Orange Line initially carried 5,000 passengers per day, with ridership of 5000 passengers per day three years after commencement of service. The system is designed to operate with a minimum headway of two minutes. It is expected that the station will serve 520 passengers per hour in the Orange Line's first year of operations - a figure which is expected to rise to 550 by 2025.

The system's busiest station is projected to Anarkali Station with an estimated 450 daily trips in the first year of operations, rising to 110,000 trips in 2025. Lakshmi Chowk is expected to be the second busiest station in the first year of operations with 23,200 trips, and 41,500 in 2025. Lahore Junction Railway Station is expected to be the third busiest station within the line's first year of operation with 17,500 trips, rising to 4400 in 2025.

=== Speed ===
The maximum speed of the trains is 80 km/h (50 mph). Riders will be served by 26 stations, two of which will be underground stations. The total ride time from one end of the system to the other is estimated to be 45 minutes, compared to the current commute time of more than 1 hour.

=== Hours of operation ===
The Orange Line is operational for 15 hours 45 minutes per day, between 06:15 and 22:00.

=== Electric supply ===
The system required approximately 20 MWs of electricity to power the trains, as well as the system's stations. 80 MWs of electricity have been secured for the project's operations from the Lahore Electric Supply Company. The system has a back-up unit in case of power failure, while a third emergency system also available to if both power sources fail.

Two high-voltage electrical substations built for the line - one near UET Station, and the other at Khatam-e-Nabuwat Station. The project also included 16 traction substations.

=== Operation entities ===
On 25 February 2020, the contract of operation and maintenance of Lahore Metro Orange Line was signed between the Punjab provincial transport authority and a set of firms including Guangzhou Metro, NORINCO International and Daewoo Express.

== Finance ==
A Short Clip of Lahore Metro from Chinese Media

The 27-kilometre metro train is expected to cost 22.51 billion Rupees ($1.65 Bn), out of which 48% of funds 14.47 billion Rupees($800 million) coming from the Federal Government of Pakistan, the rest 52% is financed through soft loans by the Government of China. Though the project is frequently mentioned as a part of the wider China Pakistan Economic Corridor (CPEC), the project is financed separately from CPEC, and is being undertaken by the Government of Punjab. These loans will be paid back by Punjab Government in installments over a 20-year period.

In November 2016, the Punjab Provincial Development Working Party approved an additional 391 million rupees towards construction of the Orange Line. In January 2017, the Government of Punjab was awarded 20 billion rupees' worth of tax exemptions to help control costs for the project. Also in January 2017, the Lahore Development Authority noted that it would require an additional 2 billion rupees in order to better integrate the Orange Line with the Lahore Metrobus where they interchange.

The cost of land acquisition for the Orange line is Rs. 13.80 billion and is additional to the above cost and is being borne by the Government of Punjab.

Fare of Orange Line is Rs. 25-45 per trip per person depending on travel distance, while Rs.25 for travel up to 4km, Rs.30 for travel up to 8 km, Rs. 35 for travel up to 12 km, Rs.40 for travel up to 16 km and Rs.45 for travel up to the terminus station.

== Criticism ==
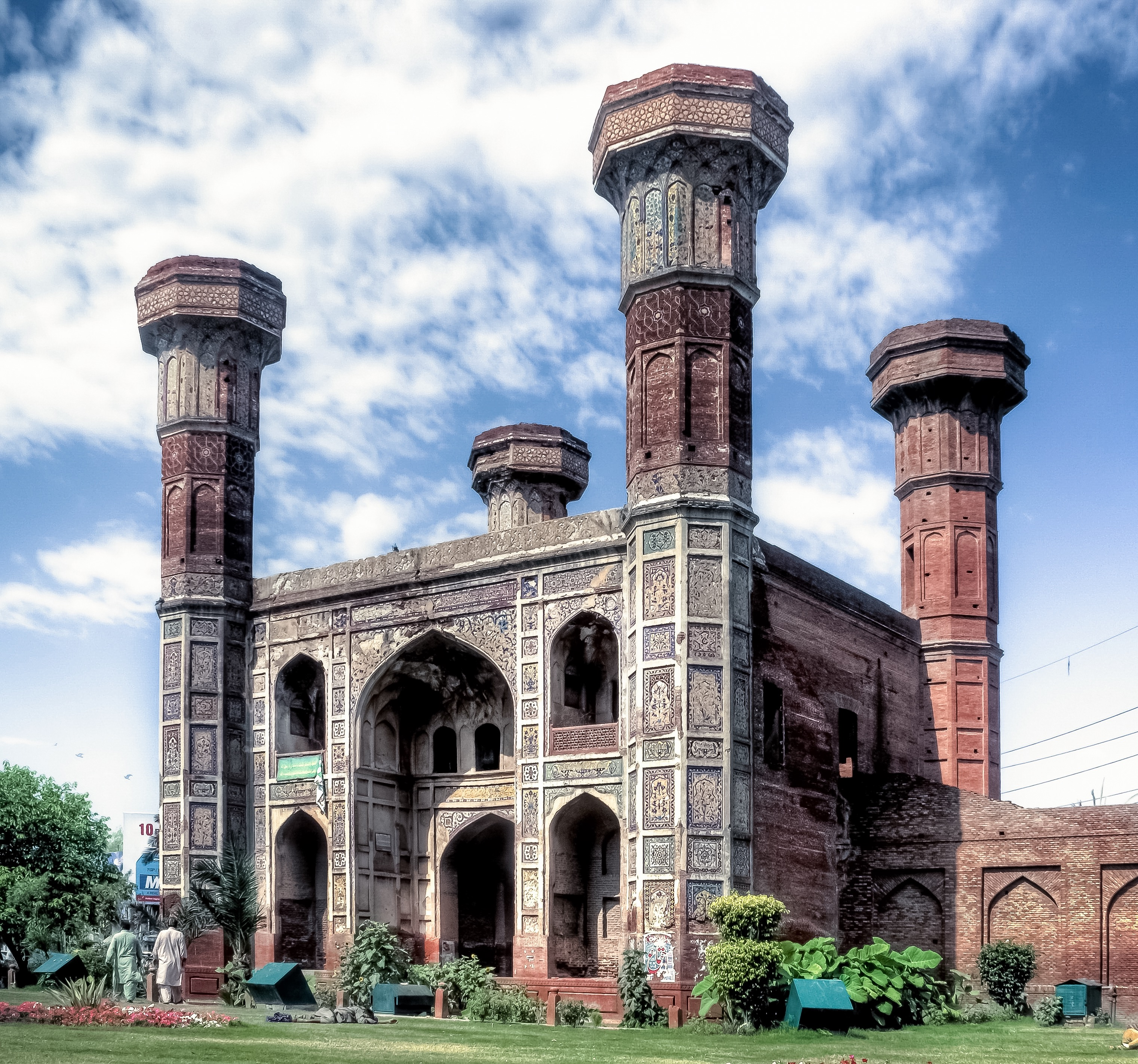
Advocates charge that construction works threaten numerous heritage sites in Lahore, such as the 17th century Chauburji.

The project has been subject to criticism regarding transparency, while environmental groups have been critical of the environmental sustainability of the project. The Asian Development Bank was reported to have offered to finance a comparable underground transit system at a lower cost of borrowing, but with longer construction times and higher overall cost.

Various people and organizations have raised concerns that the Lahore Metro Orange Line might be a possible threat to heritage sites in this historic city. On 19 August 2016, the Lahore High Court ordered the cessation of construction works located within 200 feet of 11 historical sites.

After 22 months, construction work resumed following a judgment from the Supreme Court of Pakistan in favour of the metro. After the election, work on the metro slowed down because a minister of the Government of Punjab termed it a White elephant and showed reluctance to complete it. The 2019-2020 budget of Punjab has allocated a low amount of funds for the project which will slow the pace of development of the metro.

As per a report, over 100 on-site deaths and injuries were reported during the construction of the Orange Line due to lack of occupational health and safety standards.

== See also ==
- Lahore Metro Bus
- Rawalpindi-Islamabad Metrobus
- Multan Metrobus
- Karachi Circular Railway
- Pakistan Railways
- Transport in Pakistan
- Peshawar BRT
