= Gulshan-e-Ravi =

Residential neighbourhood in Lahore, Pakistan

- Neighbourhood
- Country: Pakistan
- Province: Punjab
- City: Lahore
- Tehsil: Lahore City

Gulshan-e-Ravi (Punjabi, Urdu: گلشن راوی) is a residential neighborhood located in the Lahore City Tehsil of Lahore, Punjab, Pakistan. The residential neighborhood gets its name because it was previously the path of the River Ravi. "Gulshan" means garden, while "Ravi" pays tribute to the River Ravi that flows through this area.

Gulshan-e-Ravi is divided into blocks A to H.
