= Thokar Niaz Baig =

Residential neighbourhood locality in Lahore, Pakistan

Coordinates: 31°28′N 74°14′E

Thoker Niaz Baig ٹھوکر نیاز بیگ
- Neighbourhood
- Interactive map of Thoker Niaz Baig ٹھوکر نیاز بیگ
- Country: Pakistan
- Province: Punjab
- City: Lahore
- Tehsil: Iqbal

Government
  - Type: Union Council

Thokar Niaz Baig (Punjabi, Urdu: ٹھوکر نیاز بیگ) is a locality in Iqbal Tehsil of Lahore, Punjab, Pakistan.

== History ==
Niaz Beg used to be a fortified settlement. It served as a safe-haven for residents of Lahore during the invasion of Ahmad Shah Abdali and the Afghan capture of Lahore in 1748. Before the partition of India and the creation of Pakistan in 1947, the town of Thokar Niaz Beg was located 7 miles outside the Lahore city limits.

A temple named Bhadrakali Mandir is located in the area. The area had largely equal population of Sikh, Muslim, and Hindu communities. After 1947, most of the houses of this area were allotted to migrated Mewati families.

== Transportation ==
Thokar Niaz Baig serves as the major point of entry into Lahore from the south/west. It serves as the junction between the M-2 motorway and N5 national highway (Multan Road) as well as the Lahore Ring Road. Thokar Niaz Baig is also the site of the Lahore Jinnah Bus Terminal. In October 2020 a metro station of the Orange Line opened here.
