= Lahore Metrobus =

Transport Services in Pakistan

Lahore Metrobus لاہور میٹرو بس
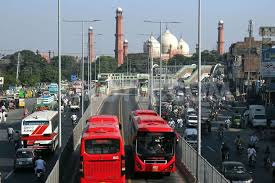
- Route of the metrobus, with Badshahi Mosque in the Walled City of Lahore in the background

Overview
- System: Lahore Metrobus
- Operator: Government of Punjab, Pakistan; Government of Pakistan
- Vehicle: 66 Buses
- Status: Active
- Began service: 11 February 2013; 13 years ago

Route
- Route type: Bus rapid transit
- Locale: Lahore, Punjab, Pakistan,
- Start: Shahdara Metrobus Terminal Station
- End: Gajjumata Metrobus Terminal Station
- Length: 27 km
- Stations: 6:00 – 22:00

Service
- Ridership: 180,000-220,000

The Lahore Metrobus (MBS) is a bus rapid transit service (BRTS) operating in Lahore, Punjab, Pakistan. The service is integrated with Lahore Transport Company's local bus service to operate as one urban transport system, providing seamless transit service across Lahore District with connections to suburban communities.

It consists of 27 stations located on the Lahore–Kasur Road, one of the main arteries of the city.

The Lahore Metrobus was designed to be opened in stages, with the first stage, stretching from Gajju Matta to Shahdara Bagh, opening on 11 February 2013. The 27.0-kilometre (16.8 mi) stretch was opened with 45 buses during a ceremony by Chief Minister of Punjab Shehbaz Sharif along with Deputy Prime Minister of Turkey Bekir Bozdağ. The second and third stages have been put on hold, as proposals have been put forth to convert the remaining stages to light rail.

== History ==
Lahore Transport Company (LTC) was established in 1984 to ease the traffic conditions of Lahore and improve bus services. LTC got all the transport responsibilities of travelling in Lahore in December 2009. A BRTS fleet of 650 Buses was introduced and given the name "Lahore Bus Company". However, the BRTS did not have dedicated lanes and had to share roads with regular traffic, with no right-of-way privileges. This resulted in a system that was a BRTS only in name.

=== Planning ===
After 20 years of discussion, the ambitious Lahore Metro, which had first been proposed in 1991, was abandoned in favour of a bus transit system, inspired by the Istanbul Metrobus system and the TransMilenio of Bogotá, Colombia. Both local and Turkish experts developed plans in the last quarter of 2011.

=== Construction ===
The project's construction was divided into different packages and awarded to various contractors. Haji Muhammad Aslam (HMA) and Sons Cranage (Pvt.) Ltd. were responsible for all major heavy steel and pillar work, which included digging into the ground to develop the project's foundations. M/s Zahir Khan & Brothers, in joint venture with M/s Reliable Engineering Services (Pvt.) Limited, constructed the flyover section, including two elevated rotaries for the BRTS. The construction project began in March 2012, and buses entered service in February 2013. The system was constructed by the Traffic Engineering and Planning Agency (TEPA), a subsidiary of the Lahore Development Authority (LDA), at a cost of Rs 29.65 billion. The system was built on the build–operate–transfer basis via the collaboration between the Punjab and Turkish governments.

The system was inaugurated by Punjab, Chief Minister, Mian Shahbaz Sharif on 11 February 2013, in a ceremony attended by Turkish Deputy Prime Minister Bekir Bozdağ, Prime Minister and PML-N ex-chief Nawaz Sharif, as well as ambassadors from many other countries. The Mayor of Istanbul, Kadir Topbaş, also announced a gift of 100 buses. It is Pakistan's first bus rapid transit system.

=== Operation ===
Lahore MBS currently operates a fleet of 66 buses, which were deployed by Albayrak Platform Turizm after a seven-year contract in 2013. The buses run on a single 28.7 km long Ferozepur Road corridor with two other corridors being planned. Buses on the current route have an average speed of 26 km/h. The system uses e-ticketing and Intelligent Transportation System wand. System operations are managed by the Punjab Metrobus Authority (PMBA), though IT services are handled in coordination with the Punjab IT Board.

Following the initiation ceremony, use of the system was to be free during the first month. However, following a week of chaos and overcrowding, a fare of Rs. 20 (US$0.2) was imposed. Currently, the fare of metro bus is 30 rupees irrespective of the destination.

According to the Lahore Transport Company, the daily ridership of the Metrobus exceeds 180,000, with the peak hourly ridership being 10,000 passengers per hour per direction (p/h/d). Studies conducted by the transport company claim that this figure will increase by 222% to 20,000 p/h/d in 2021. To keep the cost affordable for everyone, Punjab Government has to pay Rs 40 as a subsidy on each Rs 20 ticket.

== Design ==
The Lahore Metrobus meets the criteria laid out by the Institute for Transportation and Development Policy. It has barrier-controlled, automated off-board fare collection, a service interval of less than 2 minutes during peak hours, stations with well-designed signage and information systems, and a precision bus docking system (See: Guided Bus). The terminal approach system has escalators and underground, subway-styled approach tubes. Due to these approach tubes, prospective passengers don't have to cross high-speed roads to get to the stations, but go below them instead, an example of a segregated Right-of-way. The stations have parking spaces for motorbikes and cycles while the two terminals provide car-parking facilities as well.

=== Ticketing ===
Two types of ticketing systems exist at the Metrobus terminals:

- Single-ride tokens that are good for one journey only and can be purchased for Rs.30 (US$0.17) at the on-site ticket booth or the self-service Ticket Vending Machines .
- Metrobus Cards that can be utilized for multiple journeys. These RFID-based cards are credit-card sized and are available at the Metro Bus ticket offices for a refundable amount of Rs.130 (US$0.73). These cards can be recharged to a maximum balance of Rs.1000 (US$5.65) at the TVMs. The Metrobus cards remove the hassle of standing in a queue for a token and card-holders can proceed directly to the terminal. The same card can also be used on the feeder routes of Metro Bus.

== Expansion ==
The Punjab Government in April 2015 approved the expansion of Lahore Metrobus. 15-kilometre track will be added to the current route. On the northern end, it will be expanded 10 kilometres from Shahdara to Kala Shah Kaku, and on the southern end it will be expanded 5 kilometres from Gajjumata to Kahna.

== Incidents ==
=== Overheating vehicles, May 2013 ===
During late May 2013, the Metrobuses started to develop an overheating problem as the temperatures in the city crossed 45 °C (113.0 °F). The air-conditioners gave way, and the engines started blowing fumes. Passengers had to bear sweltering heat in the congested buses as well as constant stoppages. The Punjab Metrobus Authority's public relations officer, Amir Masood, told the media that when the buses were imported the manufacturers, Sweden-based Volvo and China-based Sunwin, were told to provide buses that could remain operational in temperatures approaching 51 °C (123.8 °F). When the operational error came to the surface, Masood said that the suppliers were being fined and the further import of buses from them was halted. To counter the problem, new air-conditioning units were fitted in the buses in late June 2013.

== Related projects ==
The Punjab Government, in the development program of 2013–14, proposed similar Metrobus projects for Rawalpindi, Faisalabad and Multan. Metrobus in Islamabad-Rawalpindi Metrobus was inaugurated on 4 June 2015 by the Prime Minister. Multan Metrobus was inaugurated on 24 January 2017 by PM Nawaz Sharif. Faisalabad and Gujranwala Metrobus Projects are under construction. Sargodha and Sialkot Metro Bus Projects are planned.

== See also ==
- Orange Line (Lahore Metro)
- Transport in Lahore
- Rawalpindi–Islamabad Metrobus
- TransMilenio
- Transjakarta
- Multan Metrobus
- Peshawar Metrobus
- Metrobus (Istanbul)
- Metro App
