= Punjab Masstransit Authority =

Transport company in Pakistan

Punjab Mass transit Authority

Overview
- Owner: Government of the Punjab
- Area served: Punjab, Pakistan
- Locale: Punjab, Pakistan
- Transit type: Buses, LRT, BRT
- Number of lines: 6
- Chief executive: Mirza Naseer Inayat (Managing Director)
- Headquarters: 346-B Ferozepur Road, Lahore.
- Website: pma.punjab.gov.pk

Operation
- Began operation: 2012; 14 years ago
- Operators: Orange Line Metro Train System Lahore; Lahore Metrobus System; Lahore Feeder Routes; Multan Metrobus; Multan Feeder Routes; Pakistan Metrobus System

The Punjab Masstransit Authority (PMA; Urdu: ادارہ عوامی نقل و حمل پنجاب) is a public transportation authority of the Punjab province in Pakistan. PMA operates in the province's urban centers namely Lahore, Multan and the twin cities of Islamabad and Rawalpindi.

Punjab Masstransit Authority is a statutory body established by the Government of the Punjab which plans, constructs, maintains and operates the mass transit systems in the major cities of Punjab. Set up in 2012, the authority is tasked with providing safe, efficient and comfortable urban transportation systems in the province. It is headquartered from the 5th floor of the Arfa Software Technology Park on Ferozepur Road, Lahore.

== Systems ==
The PMA operates the following systems:

- Orange Line Metro Train System Lahore
- Lahore Metrobus System
- Lahore Feeder Routes
- Faisalabad Metrobus
- Multan Metrobus
- Multan Feeder Routes
- Pakistan Metrobus System (Rawalpindi-Islamabad)

== Members ==
The Authority consists of following members:

=== Chairperson ===
- Chief Minister of Punjab

=== Members ===
- Minister for Transport of the Government
- Four members of Provincial Assembly of the Punjab including at least one female member of the Assembly and two members of National Assembly of Pakistan nominated by the Government
- Three persons including at least one woman from the private sector nominated by the Government
- Chairman, Lahore Transport Company
- Chairman Planning and Development Board of the Government
- Secretary to the Government, Finance Department
- Secretary to the Government, Transport Department
- Managing Director of the Authority
- Secretary of the Authority

== See also ==
- Transport in Pakistan
