= WAPDA House =

WAPDA House واپڈا ہاؤس
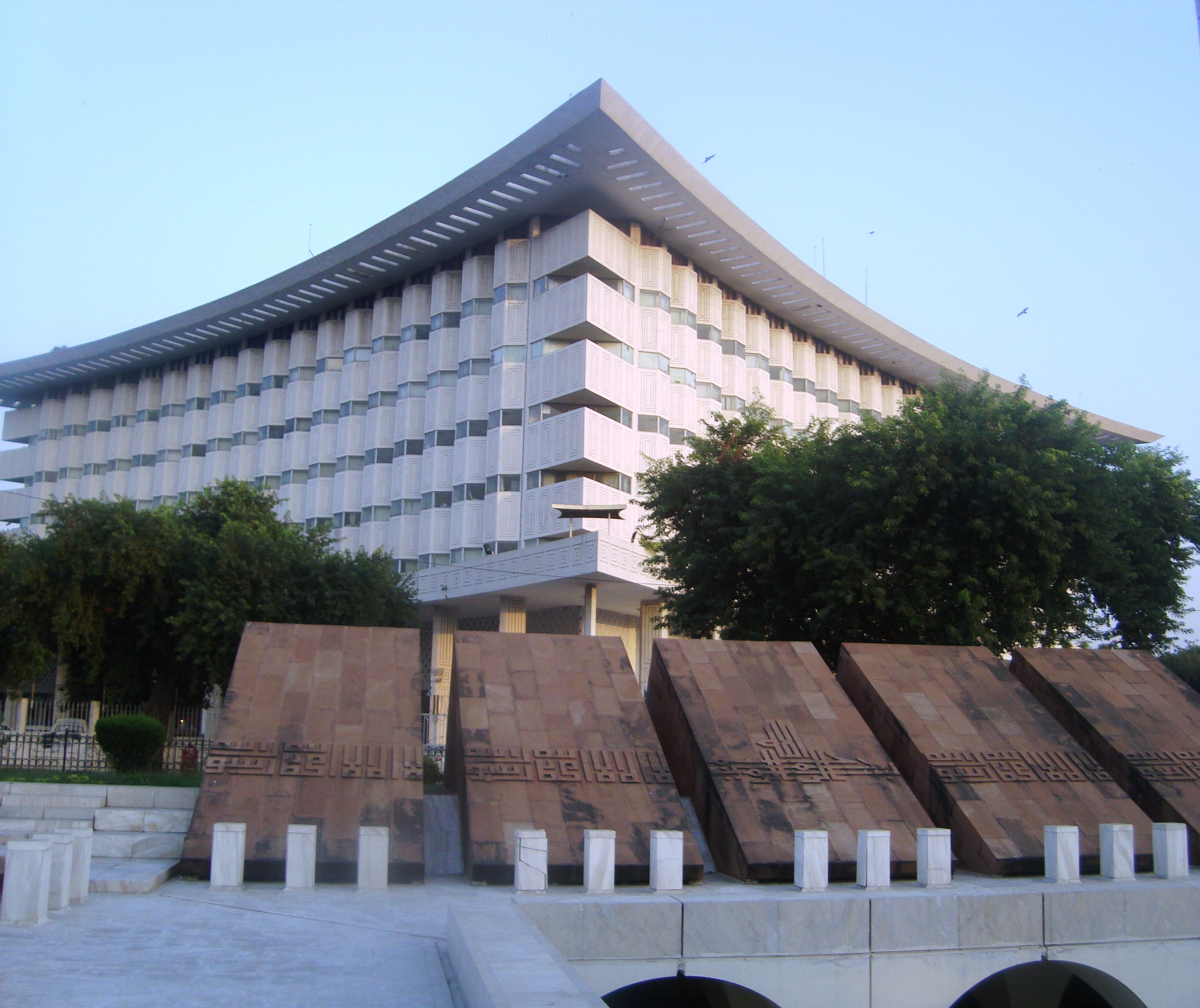
- WAPDA House was built in a 1960s Modernist style
- Interactive map of the WAPDA House واپڈا ہاؤس area

General information
- Type: Office building
- Architectural style: Modernist
- Location: Mall Road (Shahrah-e-Quaid-e-Azam), Lahore-54000, Punjab, Pakistan
- Coordinates: 31°33′32.60″N 74°19′33.22″E
- Current tenants: Water and Power Development Authority
- Completed: 1967
- Owner: Government of Pakistan

Height
- Height: 35 metres (115 ft)

Technical details
- Floor count: 9
- Floor area: 51,000 square metres (549,000 sq ft)

Design and construction
- Architect: Edward Durell Stone

Other information
- Number of rooms: ~1,000

Website
- www.wapda.gov.pk

The WAPDA House (Urdu/Punjabi: واپڈا ہاؤس) is a nine-story office building located in Lahore, Pakistan, that serves as the headquarters of the Water and Power Development Authority (WAPDA). It is one of several prominent government buildings located at Charing Cross on Lahore's Mall Road, officially known as Shahrah-e-Quaid-e-Azam. The building shares views of the Punjab Provincial Assembly, Islamic Summit Minar, Masonic Lodge, and other key landmarks.

It was designed by the American architect Edward Durell Stone, and completed in 1967.

== History ==
The Water and Power Development Authority was established in 1958 to develop Pakistan's water and power infrastructure. As the scope of WAPDA's operations increased, so did the number of its offices which were scattered throughout Lahore. The WAPDA House was accordingly conceived as a headquarters that would accommodate all WAPDA offices. The design was prepared by the American architect Edward Durell Stone in 1962.

Around 33 kanals and 6 marlas of land were purchased and the existing Mela Ram and Jodha Mal buildings were demolished to make way for the site on Mall Road, where the building now stands. The total construction cost was estimated at Rs. 42,643,000. Former Prime Minister Zulfiqar Ali Bhutto described the project as a symbol of neocolonialism, and called it a "white elephant" due to its enormous cost at the time. Construction was initiated in October 1963 and completed in 1967. The civil works and electrification were performed by local engineering firms. Around 17,000 tonnes of cement and 5,650 tonnes of steel were used for the construction, along with a large quantity of wood, plate glass and other masonry materials.

Being the headquarters, the executive offices of WAPDA, Pakistan Electric Power Company and various other power companies are located here. Initially, the lower floors were rented out to private offices before the entire building came under WAPDA's control.

== Structure ==
The WAPDA House has two underground basement levels in addition to seven floors comprising the tower, containing around 1,000 rooms. It has a gross area of 51,000 square metres (549,000 sq ft) and a height of 35 metres (115 ft) above ground level, excluding the roof. The rooftop features a perforated canopy with a 12 metres (40 ft) high plexiglas dome, covering a central rotunda that is 20 metres (65 ft) in diameter. This interior circular hall extends to the full height of the building. On the ground floor, corridors of 6 metres (20 ft) width each connect the three entrance halls to the circular hall.

The architecture of the building combines old and modernist elements, and is distinct from that of surrounding structures. The whole exterior is made of bay windows, and square patterns are found on both the exterior and interior. The base columns are slender and rectangular. The top edges of the building consist of perforated cantilevers.

== Features ==
WAPDA House is oriented into three wings, each with its own entrance: The Mall wing, which provides the main entrance; the tower section, which faces the Charing Cross and Shahdin Manzil; and the Egerton Road wing which faces the Punjab Assembly chambers. The sub-basement contains parking spaces, and a 400-seat WAPDA Auditorium that is used as a venue for conferences, seminars and public events. The auditorium is equipped with a stage and wide screen projectors. A sunken garden is located in front of the building which is influenced by Mughal themes.

The first floor includes a prayer space for employees. All floors are serviced by a set of lifts, and contain centralised washrooms. The building is centrally air-conditioned. Several years ago, the basement lobby housed the now closed Saloo's Restaurant which was open to the general public.

== See also ==
- List of tallest buildings in Lahore
- WAPDA Hospital
- WAPDA Town
- WAPDA Water Vision 2025
- https://www.wapda.gov.pk
