= Neela Gumbad =

Historic building in Lahore

Neela Gunbad نیلا گنبد
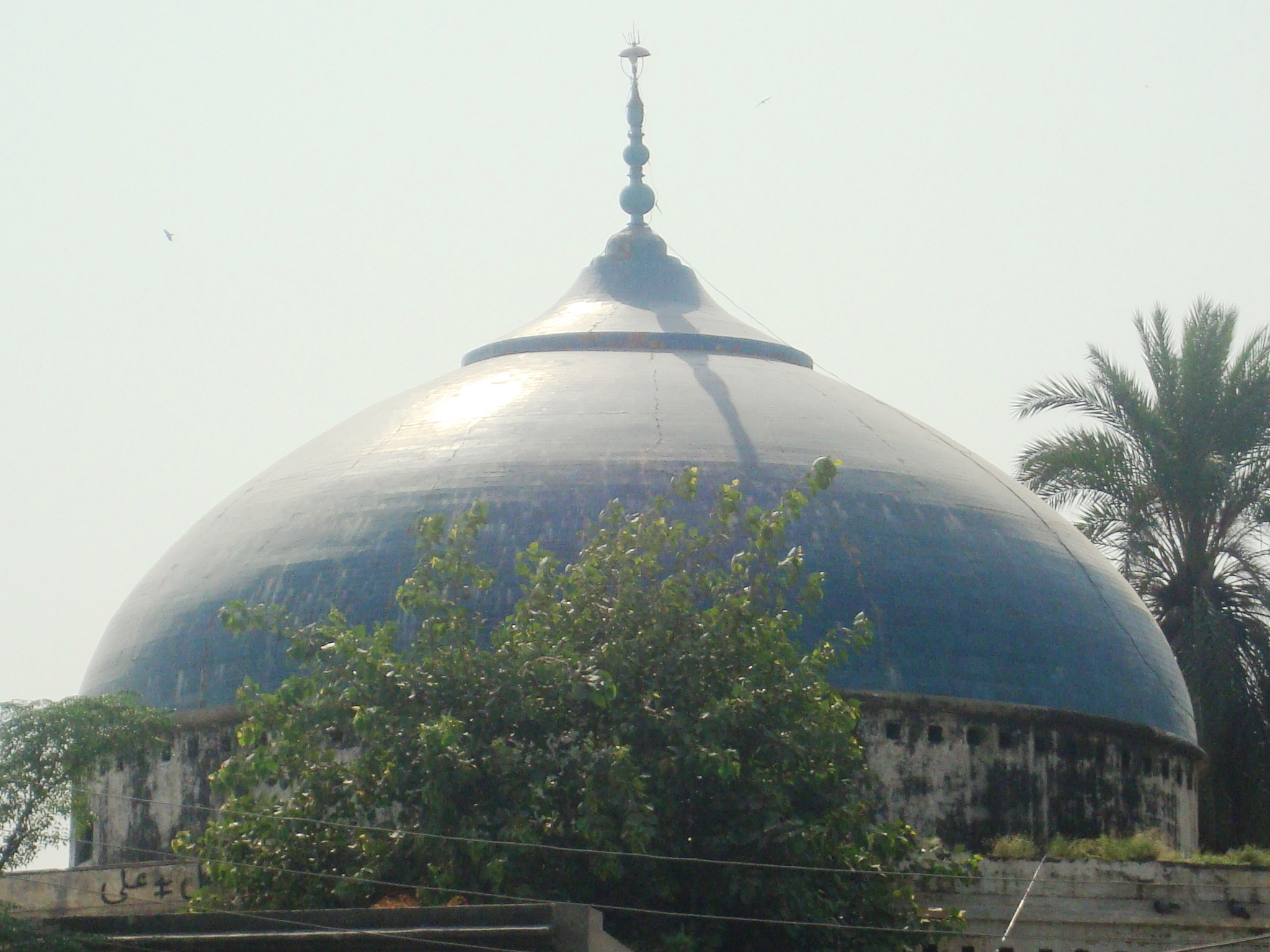
- The dome of mausoleum
- Interactive map of the Neela Gunbad نیلا گنبد area

General information
- Location: Lahore, Punjab Pakistan, Anarkali Bazar, Lahore
- Coordinates: 31.56949051°N 74.3116554°E
- Opened: 1673; 353 years ago
- Renovated: 2026
- Operator: Walled City of Lahore Authority

Neela Gumbad (Punjabi: نیلا گنبد; Urdu: نیلا گنبد; lit. 'Blue Dome') is a historic shrine located in Anarkali Bazar, Lahore, Pakistan, known for its distinctive blue dome. It serves as the mausoleum of the Sufi saint Sheikh Abdul Razzak Maki and reflects traditional Islamic architectural design.

== Location ==
Neela Gumbad is situated on The Mall, in Anarkali Bazar, Lahore in Punjab, Pakistan.

== History ==
This mausoleum is attributed to Sheikh Abdul Razzaq of Mecca. According to legend, the saint came to this region in the mid 16th century during the reign of Nāṣir-al-Dīn Humayun (r. 1530-40), the second Mughal emperor. Residing in Lahore, he became a disciple of the famous saint Miran Muhammad Shah Mauj Darya Bukhari of the Suhrawardi lineage.

The saint passed away in the year 1673, during the reign of Emperor Aurangzeb. Following his death, his disciples constructed a mausoleum at the site of his burial. An adjoining mosque was also built along with a garden surrounding the complex. The mosque, situated to the north of the shrine, became known as the Neela Gumbad Masjid. It includes a wide courtyard, three domes, three arches, and designated space for ablution.

== Conservation ==
In 2025, the Government of Punjab established the Lahore Authority for Heritage Revival (LAHR), with the aim of preserving and rehabilitating the historic sites of Lahore. Under this, a project was initiated to remove the encroachments around the Neela Gumbad and restore it to its original form and to construct an adjacent underground parking plaza.
