= Summit Minar, Lahore =

Pakistani Monument

Summit Minar
- سمٹ مینار
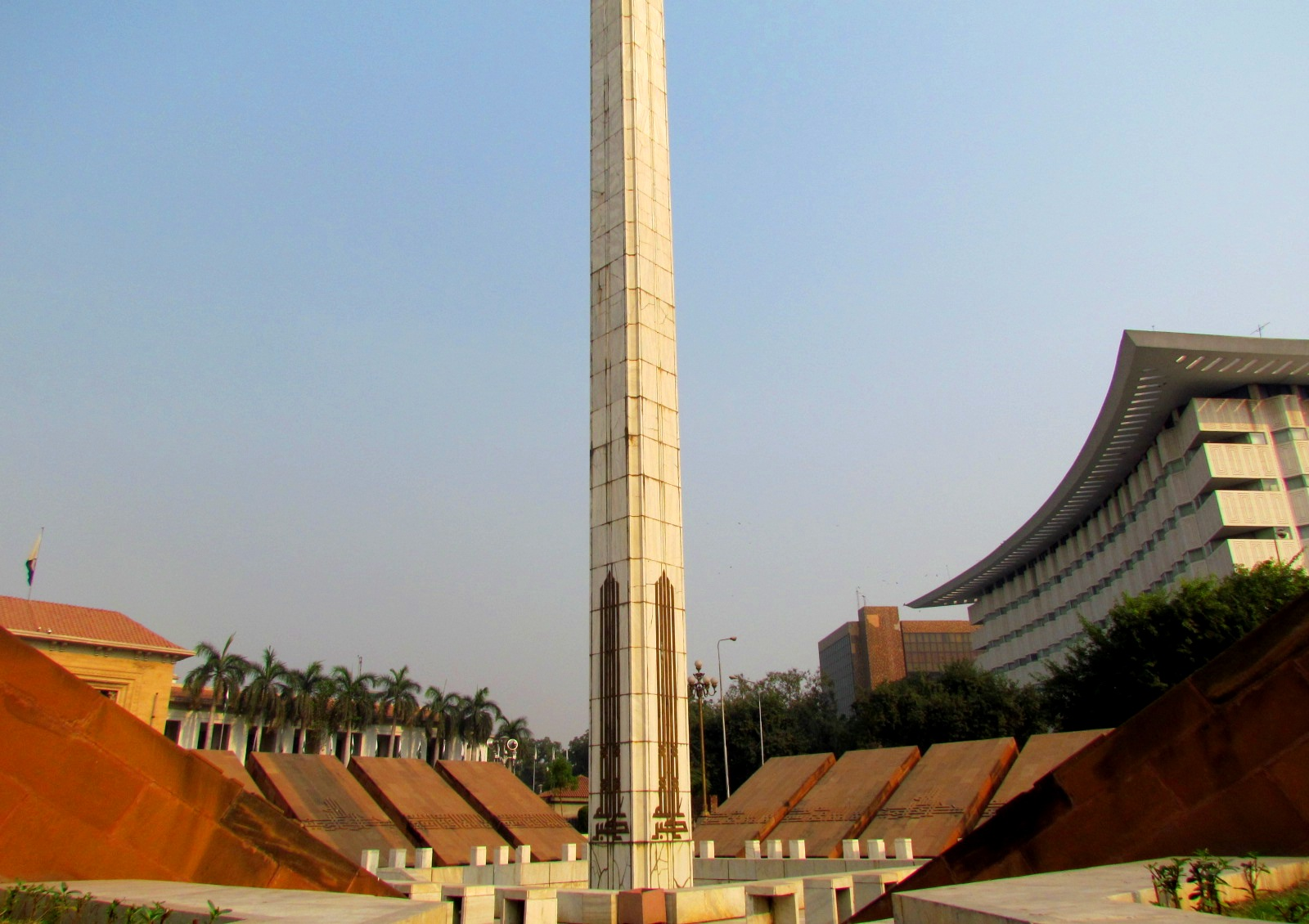
- View of the Summit Minar with Punjab Assembly Building in background and Charing Cross on the left
- Interactive map of Summit Minar
- Location: Charing Cross, Shahrah-e-Quaid-e-Azam, Lahore, Punjab, Pakistan
- Coordinates: 31.5603°N 74.3251°E
- Designer: Vedat Dalokay
- Builder: National Construction Company Pakistan Ltd.
- Type: Obelisk
- Material: Marble, stone
- Height: 155 feet (47 m)
- Beginning date: 22 February 1975
- Completion date: 1977

The Summit Minar is an obelisk-shaped structure built in the centre of Charing Cross, Mall Road in the city of Lahore, Punjab the province of Pakistan. It was built to commemorate the second Islamic Summit Conference held in Lahore from 22 to 24 February 1974. It is located in front of WAPDA House and the Punjab Assembly Building.

Its foundation stone was laid on 22 February 1975 on the first anniversary of the conference. It is 155 feet (47 m) high.

== Structure ==
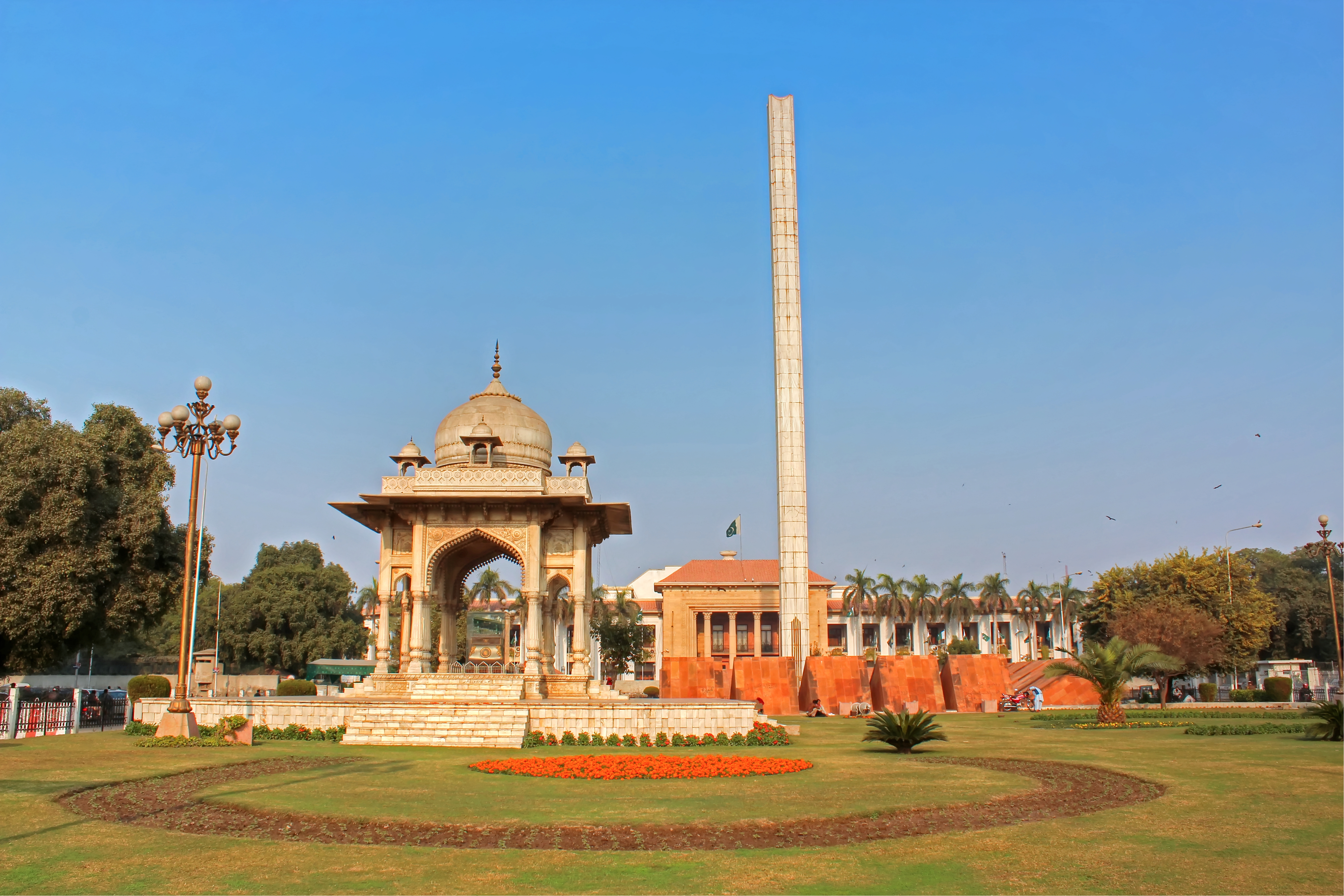
Summit Minar, Charing Cross

The minar was designed by a Turkish architect, Vedat Dalokay, who also designed the Faisal Mosque located in Islamabad. The National Construction Company Pakistan Ltd. was tasked with the construction, which was overseen by the Pakistan Public Works Department. Construction of the project commenced in February 1975, and took 20 months to complete, costing approximately Rs.15 million.

The monument, composed of an obelisk and reflecting pool, completes the design of an urban square. Below ground, there is a museum display housing art pieces, paintings and gifts given by the countries which attend the Summit in 1974, meeting rooms, and a small auditorium. The pavilion located outside was built before the minaret, and houses a copy of the Quran (written in gold leaves) in a glass case.

== See also ==
- Pakistan and the Organisation of Islamic Cooperation
