= Borneo Lodge of Harmony =

Masonic lodge located in Elopura, British North Borneo

Borneo Lodge of Harmony Borneo Lodge
- Established: 1891
- Location: Malaysia; Sandakan, Sabah
- Region served: England, Scotland, India, Australia, New Zealand, China, Hong Kong and the Straits Settlements

Borneo Lodge of Harmony (also called as Borneo Lodge) is a Masonic lodge located in Elopura, British North Borneo (present-day Sandakan, Sabah, Malaysia).

== History ==
Since the 1880s, there has been plans to establish Masonic lodge in the British Borneo area. On 13 August 1885, the first lodge in Elopura of North Borneo are being warranted. It was however never constituted as the petitioners had left before the lodge could be opened, thus erased from the register on 2 January 1888. The British officers of the North Borneo Chartered Company (NBCC) finally established the first lodge in Borneo as the "Farthest Eastern" lodge in 1891, as one of the branch of the United Grand Lodge of England, with its members represent the lodges in England, Scotland, India, Australia, New Zealand, China, Hong Kong and the Straits Settlements. It was chartered on 6 May and constituted in Elopura on 7 June in the same year.

== See also ==
- Freemasonry in Asia
