= Penang Masonic Temple =

Building in George Town, Penang, Malaysia

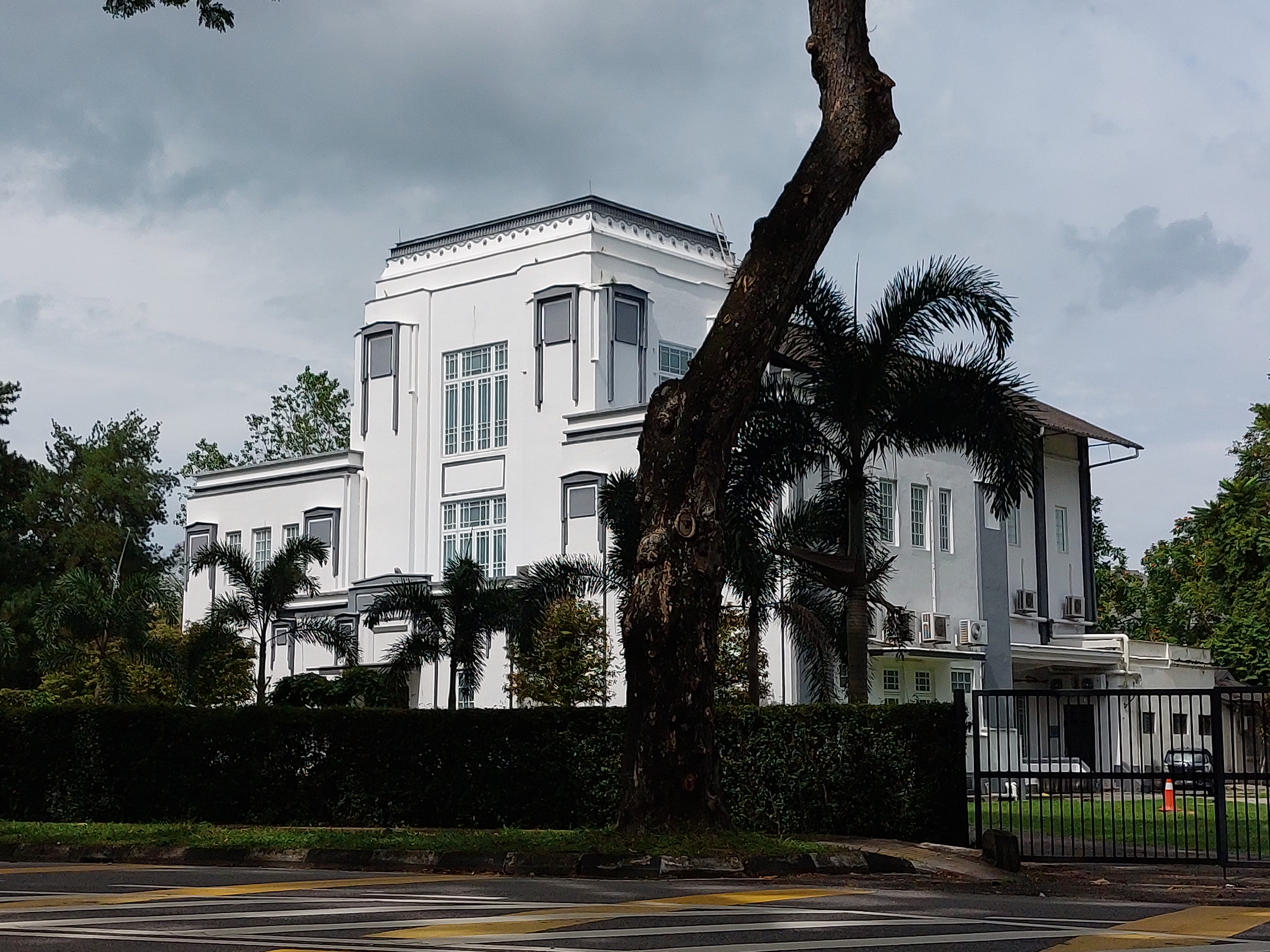
- Penang Masonic Temple, September 2022.
- Interactive map of the Penang Masonic Temple area

General information
- Architectural style: Art deco
- Location: 136 Jalan Utama, 10450 Pulau Pinang, Penang, Malaysia
- Coordinates: 5°25′35″N 100°18′7″E
- Construction started: 17 December 1927
- Completed: unknown
- Cost: M$ 31,292.50
- Client: The Penang Masonic Temple Company Limited, now Penang Masonic Temple Sdn. Bhd.

Design and construction
- Architect: Howard Leicester
- Engineer: unknown; contractor: Lee Ghee Sok

The Penang Masonic Temple is a historic Masonic building located at 136 Jalan Utama (Western Road), corner of Jalan Brown (Brown Road), in George Town, Penang, Malaysia. In 1924, The Royal Prince of Wales Lodge No. 1555, United Grand Lodge of England, and Lodge Scotia No. 1003, Grand Lodge of Scotland, each of which had its own meeting hall, agreed to build the Penang Masonic Temple at its current site to serve their own needs as well as those of other Masonic bodies in the area. A limited company was formed, with each lodge controlling half, to buy the property, construct the building and own and maintain it thereafter. The land was acquired in 1926 and the foundation was laid on 17 December 1927. Designed by architect Howard Leicester in the Art Deco style of architecture, the building was built by contractor Lee Ghee Sok.

Today it is considered a heritage site and its white exterior is painted white with some of its Art Deco details are painted blue. It is still used by the founding lodges for their meetings and is also utilised by 7 other Masonic bodies of either English or Scottish jurisdiction, which pay rent for its use.

== See also ==
- Freemasonry in Asia
- Jesselton Freemason Hall
