= Munshi Gulab Singh & Sons =

Indian printing house

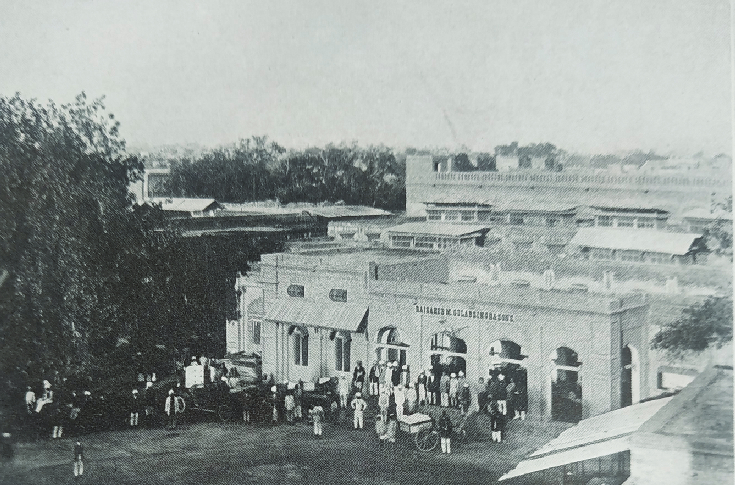
Photograph of the printing house Rai Sahib Munshi Gulab Singh & Sons, Urdu Bazaar, Lahore, Punjab

Munshi Gulab Singh & Sons was a printing house in colonial Punjab, which operated in Urdu Bazaar, Lahore the Mufid-i-Am Press (known as a chaapa khana, "printing press"), established in 1873. The company's printing press produced textbooks, school guides, and dictionaries. The company also printed copies of the Guru Granth Sahib. Originally founded by Rai Sahib Munshi Gulab Singh, after he died in 1898, the company became managed by his sons Rai Bahadur Mohan Lal and Lala Lal Chand. In the following period, the printing house established itself in Calcutta and Allahabad. The printing house held much of the colonial government's print contracts by the 1920s. In the 1940s, the firm engaged in price fixing of government printing contracts by working with other publishers. After the partition of India in 1947, the company shifted from Lahore to Delhi.
