= S. Mohkam-ud-Din and Sons Bakers =

- Location in Anarkali Bazaar, Lahore

Restaurant information
- Established: January 1, 1879
- Food type: Bakery
- Location: Lahore, Punjab, Pakistan
- Coordinates: 31°34′12.998″N 74°18′41.639″E

S. Mohkam-ud-Din and Sons Bakers is a historic bakery located in Anarkali Bazaar, Lahore, Pakistan. It is known for cakes and Lady Harrison's finger biscuits.

== History ==
S. Mohkam-ud-Din Bakery was founded on 1 January 1879 by Mohkamuddin. It was inaugurated by Lady Aitchison, the wife of Charles Umpherston Aitchison.

After the partition of India, another branch was opened in The Mall, Lahore.

The bakery has produced several unusually large cakes for special events. These include a 1,000 lb (approx. 454 kg) cake in 1953 and another in the mid-1980s. In 2005, for the visit of the Archbishop of Canterbury, Rowan Williams, the bakery prepared a 1,500 lb (approx. 680 kg) rich plum cake.
