= Masonic Temple (Lahore) =

Prince Albert Victor Lodge 2370ec
- Masonic Temple Lahore No. 2370
- Interactive map of Prince Albert Victor Lodge 2370ec
- Location: 90 Mall Road, Lahore, Pakistan
- Coordinates: 31°33′33″N 74°19′28.29″E
- Founded: 1860
- Built: 1914

Lahore Masonic Temple in the Charing Cross neighbourhood of Lahore, Pakistan, is the former home of Prince Albert Victor Lodge 2370ec, and Hope and Perseverance Lodge No. 782, two Masonic lodges warranted by the United Grand Lodge of England.

The building has not been used for masonic purposes since the lodges were disbanded in 1972, when then Prime Minister of Pakistan, Zulfiqar Ali Bhutto placed a ban on Freemasonry in Pakistan.

== Lodge of Hope and Perseverance No. 782 ==
The first Masonic Temple of the Lodge of Hope and Perseverance was built in 1859 at Anarkali, Lahore. Its site on Lodge Road is now occupied by Lady Maclagan Government High School.

The second Masonic Temple was built in 1914, using the foundation stone from its predecessor, on land that had once been a garden. The new temple was designed by Basil M. Sullivan, Consulting Architect to the government of Punjab, and mirrored the Shah Din Building, across the street along the Queens Road. It was later renovated for use by the Punjab Chief Minister's Secretariat. Due to recent additions to the Shah Din building, the two buildings are no longer mirror images of each other.

=== Rudyard Kipling ===
The author and poet Rudyard Kipling was made a Mason in the Lodge of Hope and Perseverance in 1885, at the original lodge building, under a dispensation allowing him to be initiated before his 21st Birthday. He served as secretary of the Lodge following his initiation. He remained a member of the lodge for three years, demitting in 1889. He wrote of his time in the Lodge of Hope and Perseverance in "Something of Myself" and in a letter to the Times, describing "decorating the bare walls of the Masonic Hall with hangings after the prescription of King Solomon's Temple" and meeting members of many different religious faiths, including Muslims, Hindus, Sikhs and Jews. Kipling also references the original 1859 building in the opening scene of his novel Kim, describing it as "the big blue and white Jadoo-Gher—the School of Wizards, as we named the Masonic Lodge." One plot line in the book relates to a piece of paper in Kim's possession, a "clearance-certificate", which shows that his deceased father was a Mason. In 1914, long after Kipling had left India, the lodge demolished the building that Kipling described, and replaced it with the current one.

== Current status ==
In 1972 Zulfiqar Ali Bhutto, then Prime Minister of Pakistan, placed a ban on Freemasonry and many other foreign organizations present in the country. The lodge was then disbanded and for a time the building was unused. It has been used as a multi-purpose Punjab government building.

In the late 1980s the Heritage Foundation Pakistan and concerned citizens of Lahore started a project to renovate the heritage buildings on the Mall road, including this building.

== See also ==
- Freemasonry in Asia
