= Paan Gali =

Baazaar in Lahore

Paan Gali (Punjabi: پان گلی, Urdu: پان گلی) is a bazaar in Lahore, Pakistan that is known for selling goods imported from India. It is located within Anarkali Bazaar and comprises three lanes and around fifty shops.

Paan Gali became a centre of selling Indian goods after the partition of India in 1947.

Vendors in the market sell paan, sarees, coconuts, beauty products, ayurvedic medicines, and kitchen utensils. Rafiq Abbas, a local shopkeeper of Paan Gali, has described the popularity of the locality:

I believe after Indian movies and movie stars, Indian embroidered cloth particularly sarees are most popular item in here. People from Karachi, Quetta and far-off places in Punjab come to the Paan Gali to buy kamdani, jamawar, banarsi, kataan, chikan, etc type of cloths that are considered rich in texture and unique in quality...

Paan Gali is said to bear a resemblance to Chandni Chowk of Delhi.
