= Jesselton Freemason Hall =

Jesselton Freemason Hall Lodge Kinabalu
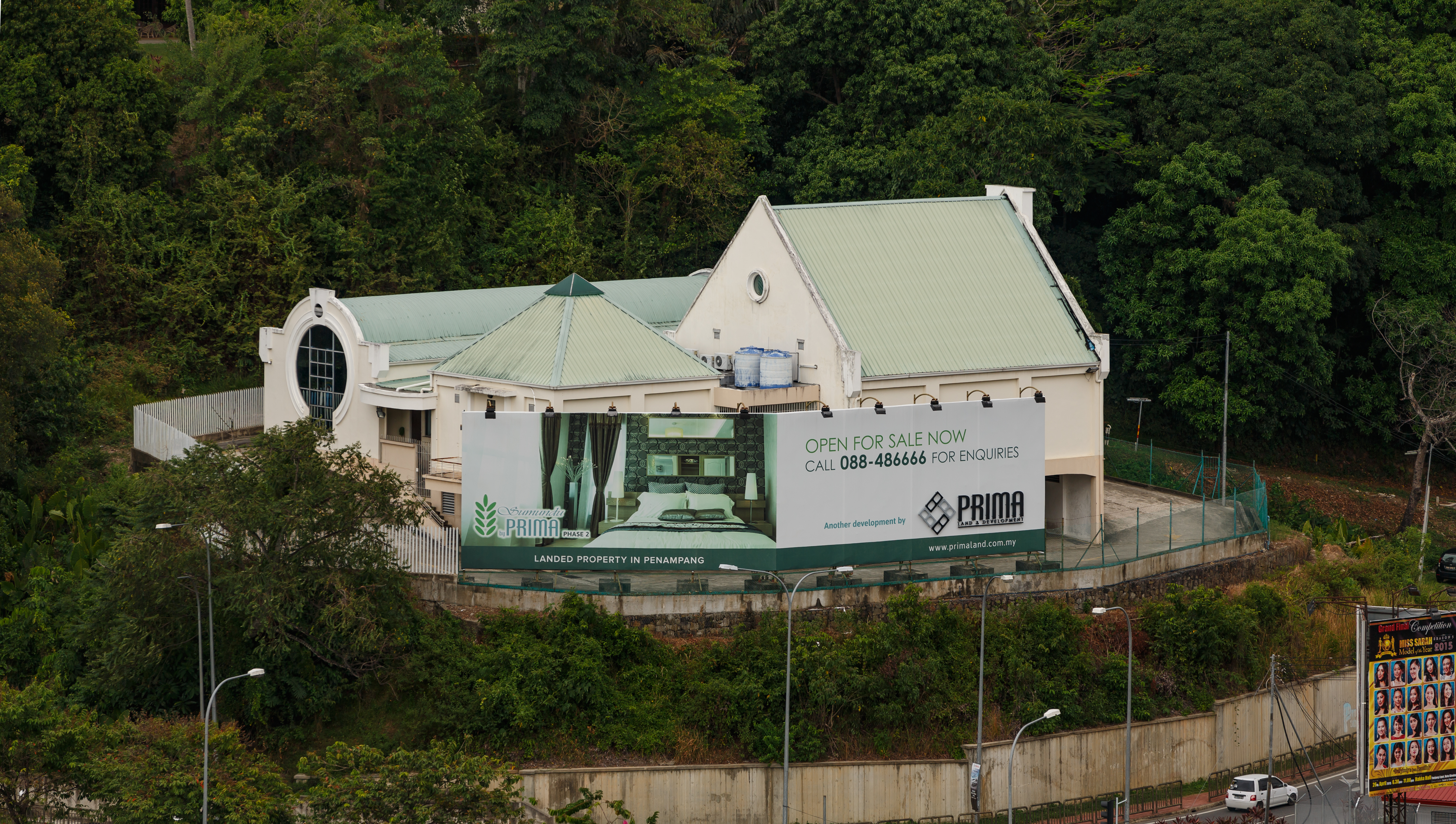
- Interactive map of the Jesselton Freemason Hall; Lodge Kinabalu area

General information
- Coordinates: 5°58′20.86″N 116°4′24.49″E
- Completed: 1951

Jesselton Freemason Hall (also called as Lodge Kinabalu) in present-day Kota Kinabalu, Sabah Malaysia is the meeting place for the Masonic lodges in the former Jesselton area. It was opened since 1951 during British Crown rule.

== History ==
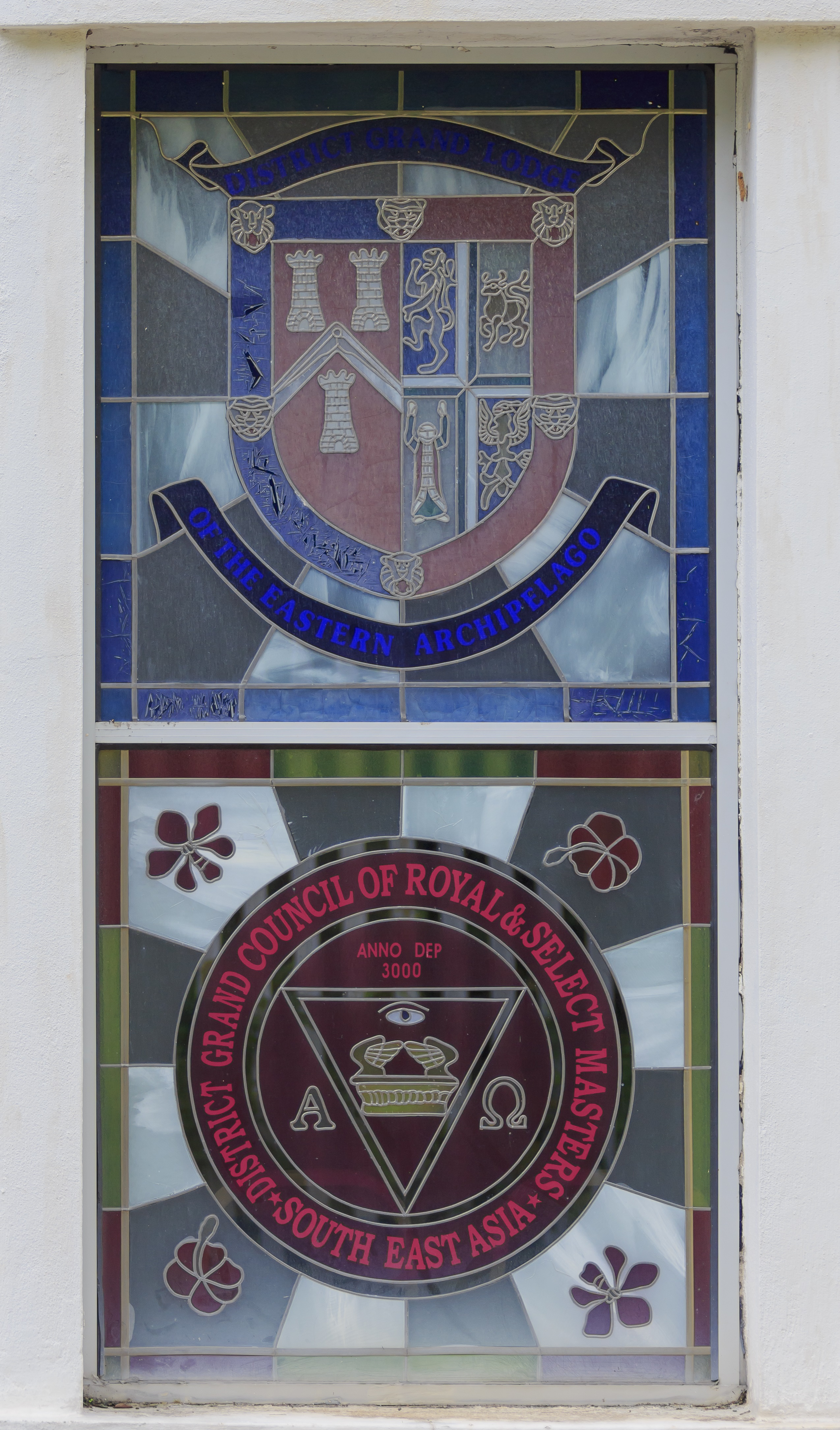
Stained glass window of Jesselton Freemason Hall (view from outside).

Since the 1880s, there has been plans to establish Masonic lodge in the British Borneo area. On 26 January 1951, Freemasonry established its firm roots in the Crown Colony of North Borneo with the Consecration of Lodge Kinabalu. A move was then made in 1960 to form a Royal Arch Chapter under the Scottish Constitution in Jesselton, to be supported by Jesselton Lodge, Elopura Lodge and Brunei Lodge which culminating in the inaugural meeting of Northern Borneo Royal Arch Chapter on 19 January 1962 in the town.

== See also ==
- Freemasonry in Asia
- Penang Masonic Temple
