= Freemasons Lodge Building (Karachi) =

Building in Karachi, Pakistan

Coordinates: 24°51′12″N 67°01′35″E

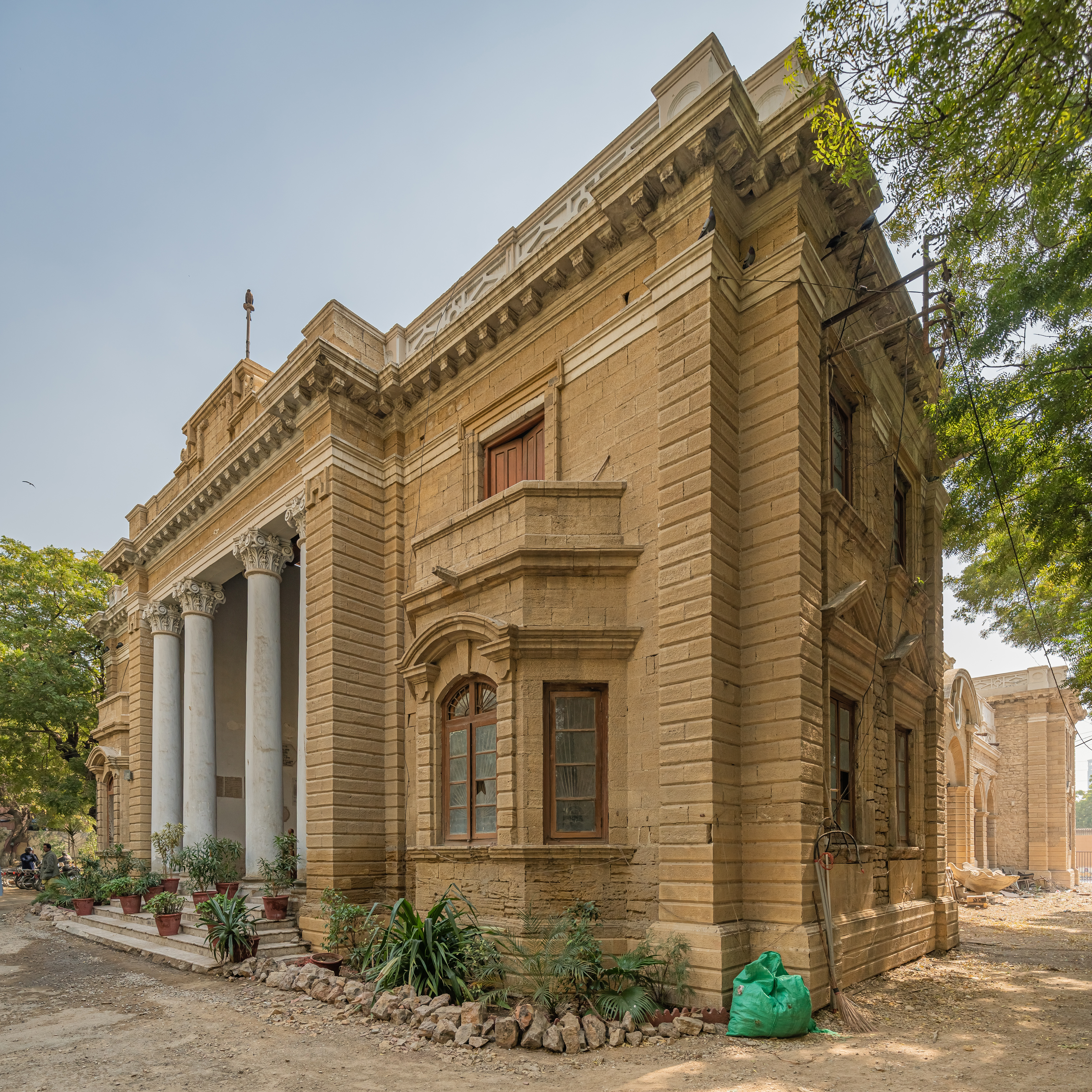
- Interactive map of the Freemasons Lodge Building area

General information
- Architectural style: Colonial era
- Location: Karachi, Pakistan, Pakistan
- Current tenants: Sindh Wildlife Department
- Inaugurated: 1914
- Client: Pakistan government
- Owner: Pakistan government

Freemasons Lodge Building in Karachi, Pakistan is a historic building built in 1914, during British rule, situated near D.J. Sindh Govt. Science College at Molana Din Muhammad Wafai Road.

The Freemasons Lodge was built by the Freemason's Trust in 1914 and was made of yellow sandstone. It was used for many years for meetings of the Freemason Society. Local people called it "jadoo ghar," meaning "House of Sorcery."

The building was taken over by the government after Freemasonry was banned in Pakistan in 1972 under the rule of President Zulfiqar Ali Bhutto. In the early 1990s it was allocated to the Sindh Wildlife Department, and it is now used by the Sindh Wildlife Fund. Around 2001, it was declared a protected heritage site under the Sindh Cultural Heritage Act of 1994. As of early 2009, renovations and preservation activity were underway, with plans to use part of the building as a museum.

== Gallery ==
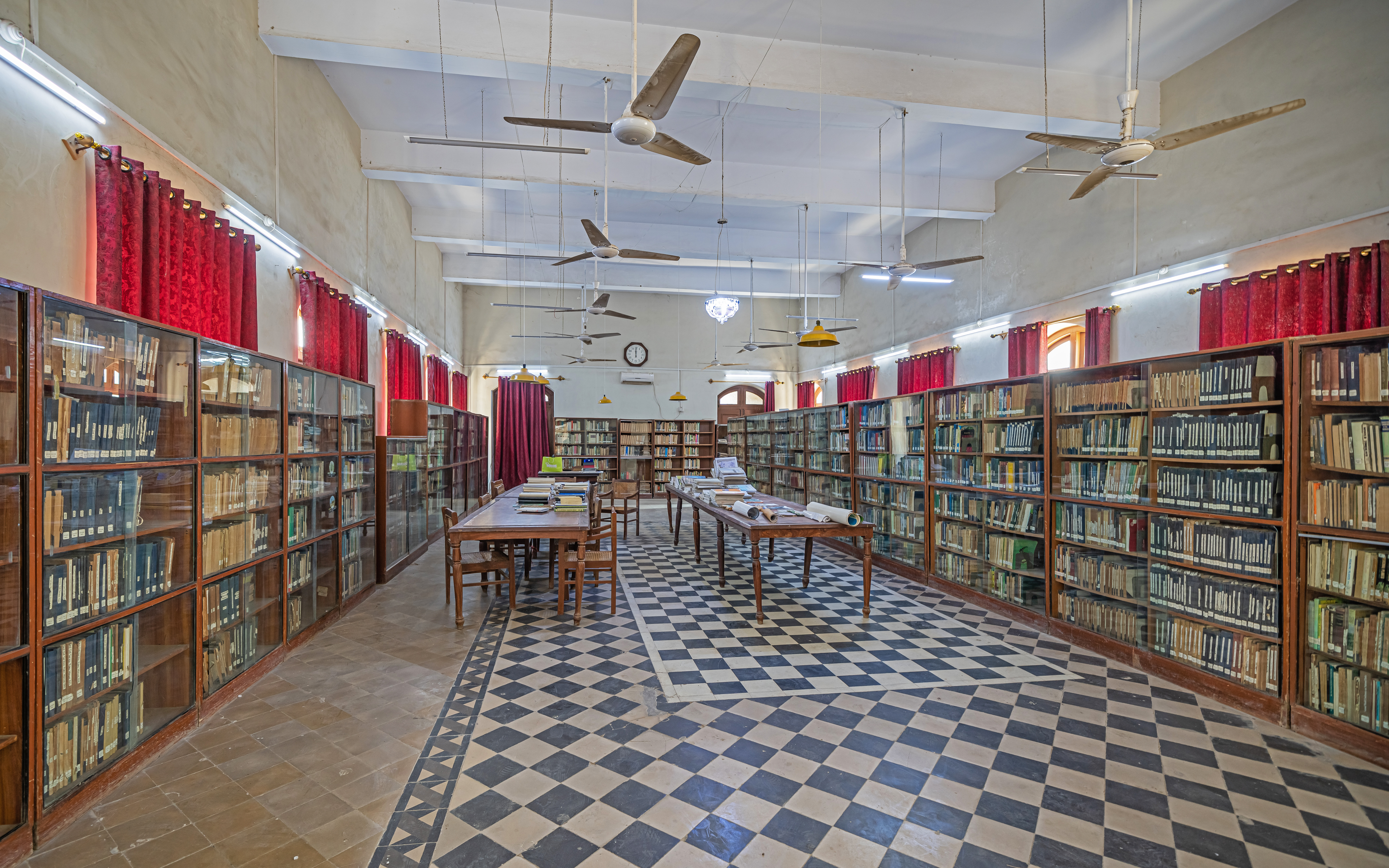
The lodge houses a small library

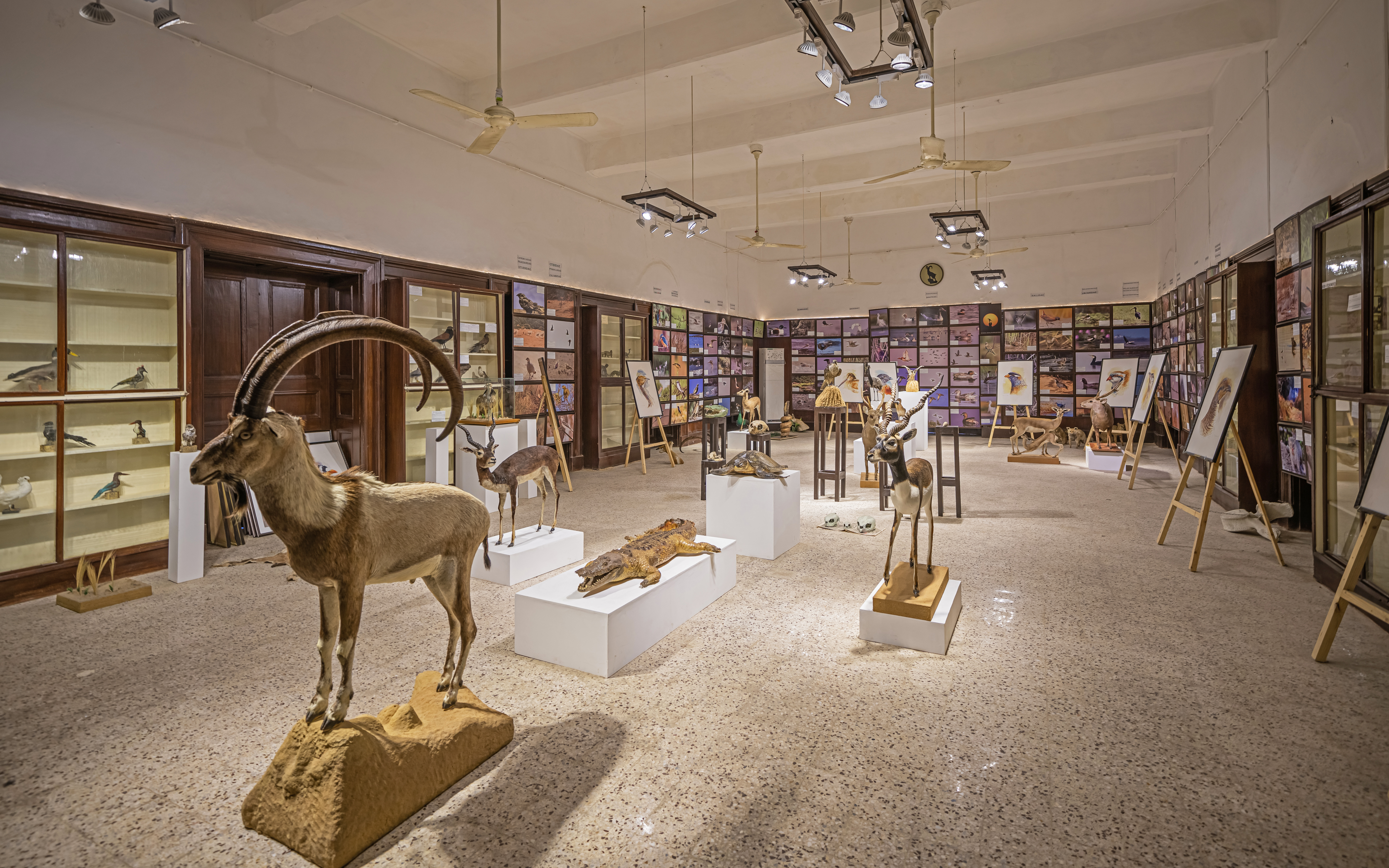
Exhibition space inside the lodge

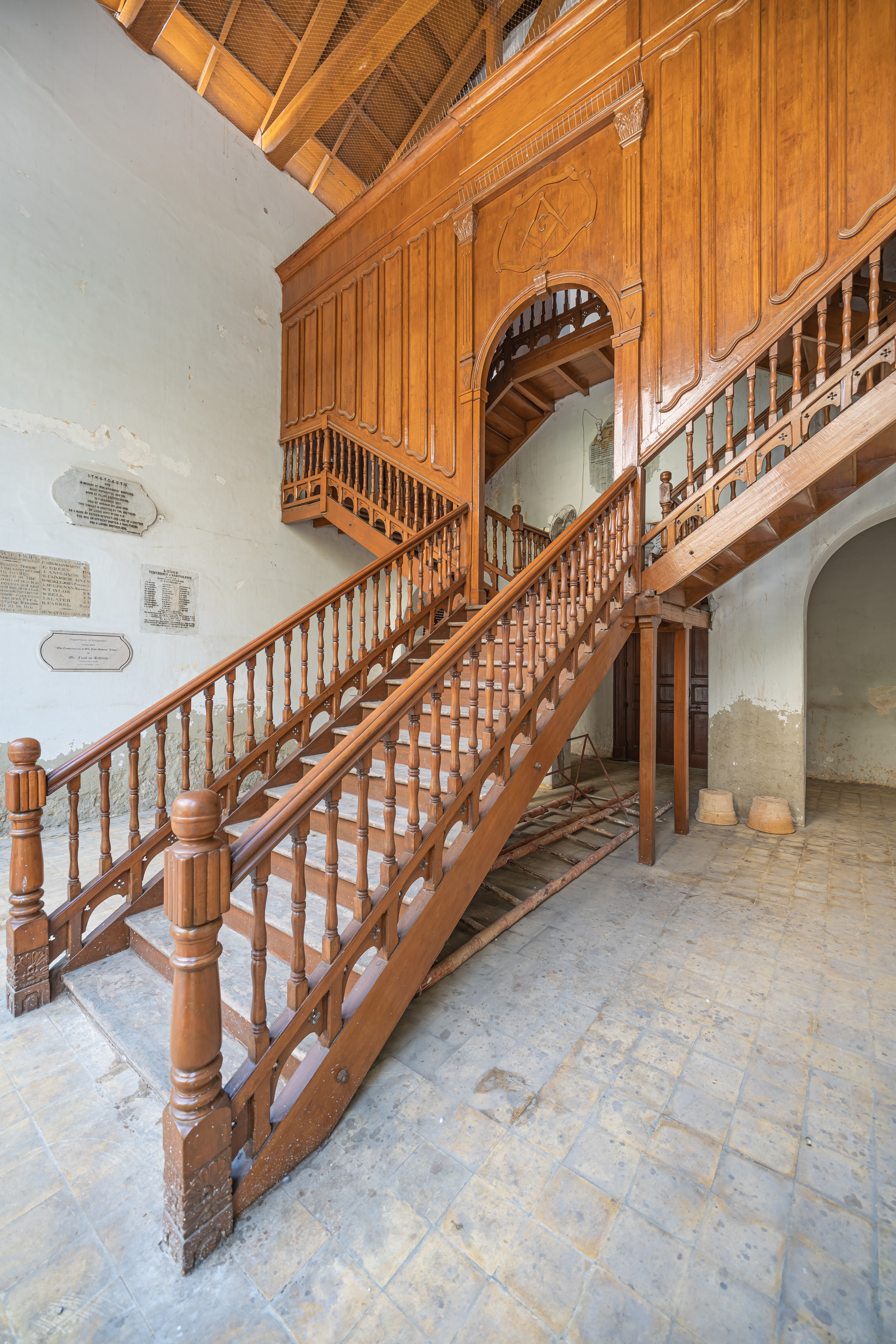
Wooden staircase near the entry
