= Freemasonry in Asia =

This is a general survey on the historical and modern presence of Freemasonry in countries located in Asia (including Armenia and Turkey).

== Armenia ==

The Grand Lodge of Armenia is a national organization, supervising Freemasonry in Armenia. It was consecrated in 2002 by representatives of the Grand Lodge of the District of Columbia, the Grande Loge Nationale Française and the Grand Lodge of Russia.

The Grand Lodge of Armenia is recognised by the United Grand Lodge of England and is located in Yerevan.

== China ==
Before the 1950s, Freemasonry in China was represented by various jurisdictions, including the United Grand Lodge of England, the Grand Lodge of Scotland, the Grand Lodge of Ireland, the Grand Lodge of the Philippine Islands, and several organizations from the United States. In 1949, with the support of the Grand Lodge of the Philippines, six Chinese-led lodges established the Grand Lodge of China. Following the establishment of the People's Republic of China, however, Masonic activities were prohibited on the mainland, forcing lodges to either cease operations or relocate to Hong Kong and Taiwan. The Grand Lodge of China relocated to Taiwan in 1954 and officially resumed its activities in 1955. Consequently, there are currently no recognized or regular Masonic organizations operating within mainland China.

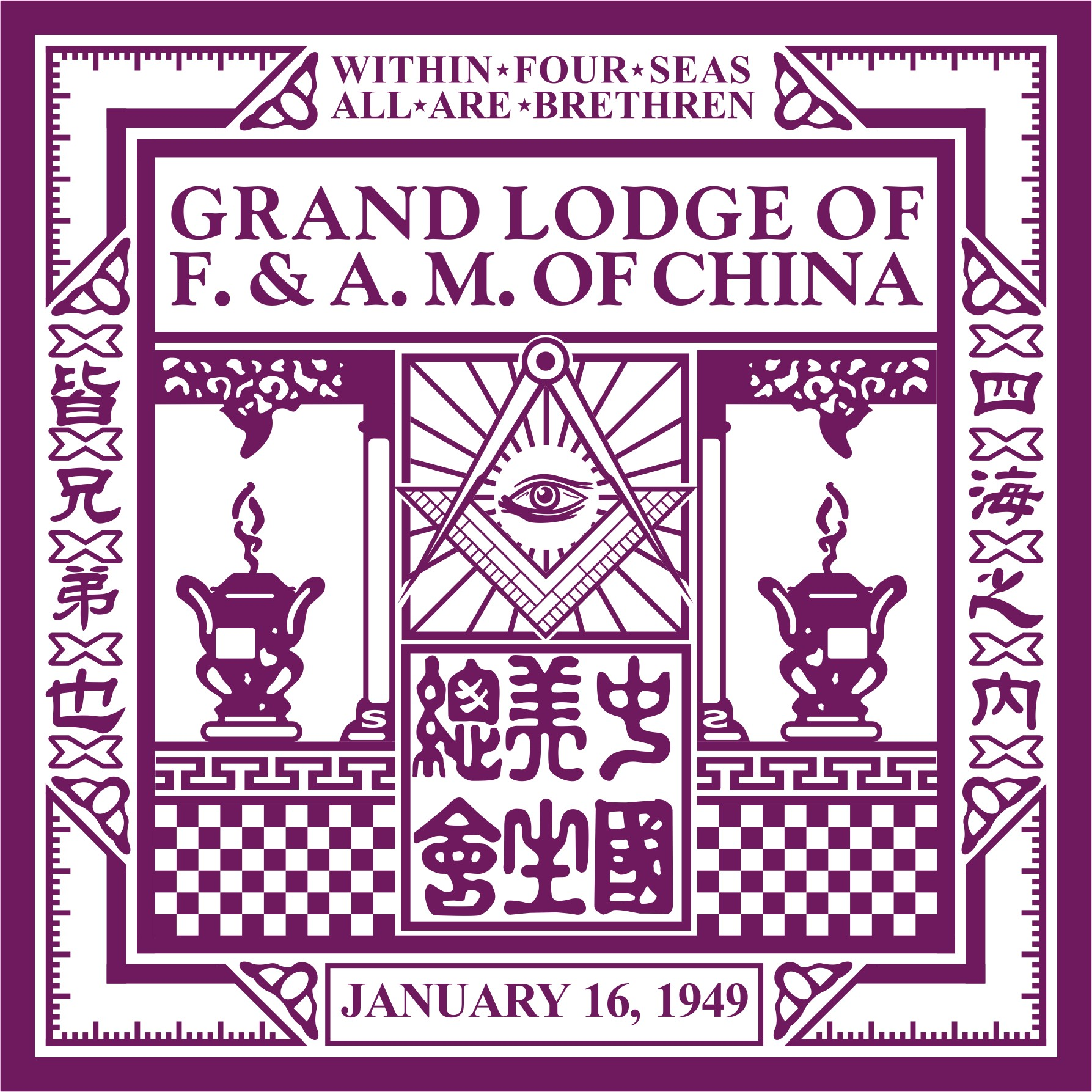
Emblem of the Grand Lodge of China

== Taiwan ==
In 1955, The Grand Lodge of China relocated to Taiwan and resumed its activities in Taipei. Today, there are 13 active lodges operating under its jurisdiction in Taiwan, including four lodges that originated from mainland China and one lodge that uses Chinese as its primary working language.

== India ==
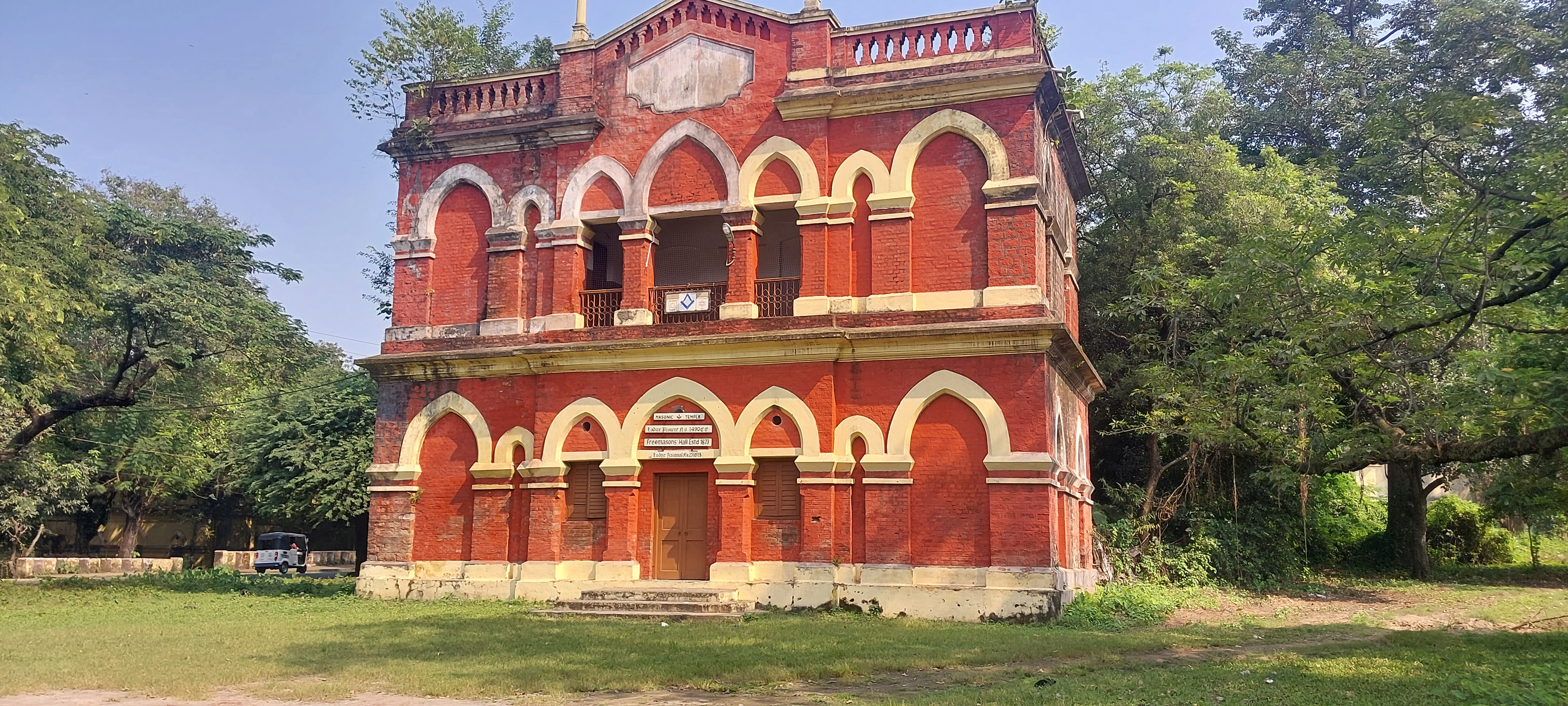
Fremasonary lodge in Asansol, India founded in 1873

Freemasonry was introduced to India in the 1730s by the English. The fraternity remained under the jurisdiction of the United Grand Lodge of England through the colonial era. An independent Grand Lodge of India was founded in 1961. As of February 2011, it has 370 lodges spread across India with more than 14,900 members and is recognised by UGLE.

The Confederation of United Grand Lodges of India was founded in 2001 and is recognised by the Grand Lodge of Belgium.

== Iran ==
The first Persian contact with freemasonry dates back to the 19th century during the Qajar period.

The Grand Lodge of Iran, established in 1969 in Tehran, existed in the country prior to the Islamic Revolution of 1979, hosted membership from various political figures, including former prime minister Jafar Sharif-Emami (who served as the lodge's grand master at one point), and branched to 43 Lodges and at least 1,035 members. Since the Revolution, Freemasonry has been banned in Iran; a "Grand Lodge of Iran in Exile" is currently established in Los Angeles, where the local Grand Lodge approved its practice in 1985.

== Israel ==
The Grand Lodge of the State of Israel was founded in 1953, it has 53 active lodges with 1400 members and is recognised by the United Grand Lodge of England.

Le Droit Humain also has an Israeli jurisdiction founded in 1989.

== Japan ==
Freemasonry in Japan first began with the opening of trade with foreign countries occasioned by Commodore Perry's Black Ships in 1866. Prior to World War II, several Grand Lodges had subordinate Lodges there, including those of England, Ireland, and Scotland. Most went dark as the war loomed, but two lodges under the Grand Lodge of Scotland, Lodge Hiogo & Osaka No. 498 in Kobe and Lodge Star in the East No. 640 in Yokohama, and one Lodge under the United Grand Lodge of England, Rising Sun Lodge No. 1401 in Kobe, remain active. After World War II, the Grand Lodge of the Philippines charted new Lodges throughout the country.

General MacArthur, commander of US forces occupying Japan, a mason himself, supported the creation of several Lodges.

The Grand Lodge of Japan was founded in 1957, it has 18 lodges with 2500 members and is recognised by the United Grand Lodge of England.

Le Droit Humain has a lodge in Tokyo, the lodge "Soleil Levant" founded in 2008 and working at the Ancient and Accepted Scottish Rite in French.

== Korea ==
In late 1907 and early 1908 a number of Freemasons then residing in Korea undertook to establish the first Masonic Lodge on the Peninsula. A Charter was issued by the Grand Lodge of Scotland on November 5, 1908, and the name Han Yang, one of the ancient names for the capital city, was chosen to designate the new Lodge. The members were initially merchants, miners, and missionaries from Lodge Hyogo and Osaka 498 in Japan; occupations that represented most of the foreign population in what was then known as Chosun. In addition to Lodge Han Yang, there are two other Scottish lodges on the Korean Peninsula: Lodge Pusan and Lodge Harry S. Truman #1727 in Pyeongtaek (on the roll of the Grand Lodge of Scotland). In December 1978 a letter was sent to facilitate Truman Lodge, and began as such, "Sixteen Master Masons, all members of the US Uniformed services or US civilian component thereof, have petitioned Lodge Han Yang 1048 and Pusan Lodge 1675, for support for the formation of a lodge in or in the immediate vicinity of (US) Osan Air Base located in the city of Songtan Up some 45 miles south of Seoul. There are reportedly some 30 Brn. additionally, who have indicated a keen interest in the formation of the lodge and who will lend their support." Similarly, MacArthur Lodge (under the jurisdiction of the Most Worshipful Grand Lodge of the Philippines). MacArthur Lodge currently holds meetings on the United States military base located within Seoul. Furthermore, numerous Prince Hall Freemasonry Lodges from the MWPHGL of Washington and Jurisdiction (and other PHA Grand Lodges) meet on various United States military bases throughout the country, including II Corinthians #96 at USAG Yongsan in Seoul, Sprig of Acacia #93 at Camp Casey, and Billy G. Miller #43 (MWPHGL Oklahoma) at Camp Humphreys.

== Lebanon ==
There are a number of different Grand Lodges and Grand Orients in Lebanon. Irregular Grand Lodges include the King Solomon Grand Lodge of Lebanon , Sun Grand Lodge (SGL) ,Grand Orient de Canaan the Grande Loge Centrale du Liban, the Grande Loge de Cèdres, the Grand Orient Arabe, and the Grande Loge Bet-El, all in the tradition of Continental Freemasonry.

There are also UGLE recognised lodges active in Lebanon operating under the Grand District of Lebanon, under the Grand Lodge of Scotland and three lodges under the Grand Lodge of the District of Columbia.

On 24 October 2018, the Grand Lodge of New York created the independent Grand Lodge of the Free and Accepted Masons of Lebanon.

== Malaysia ==
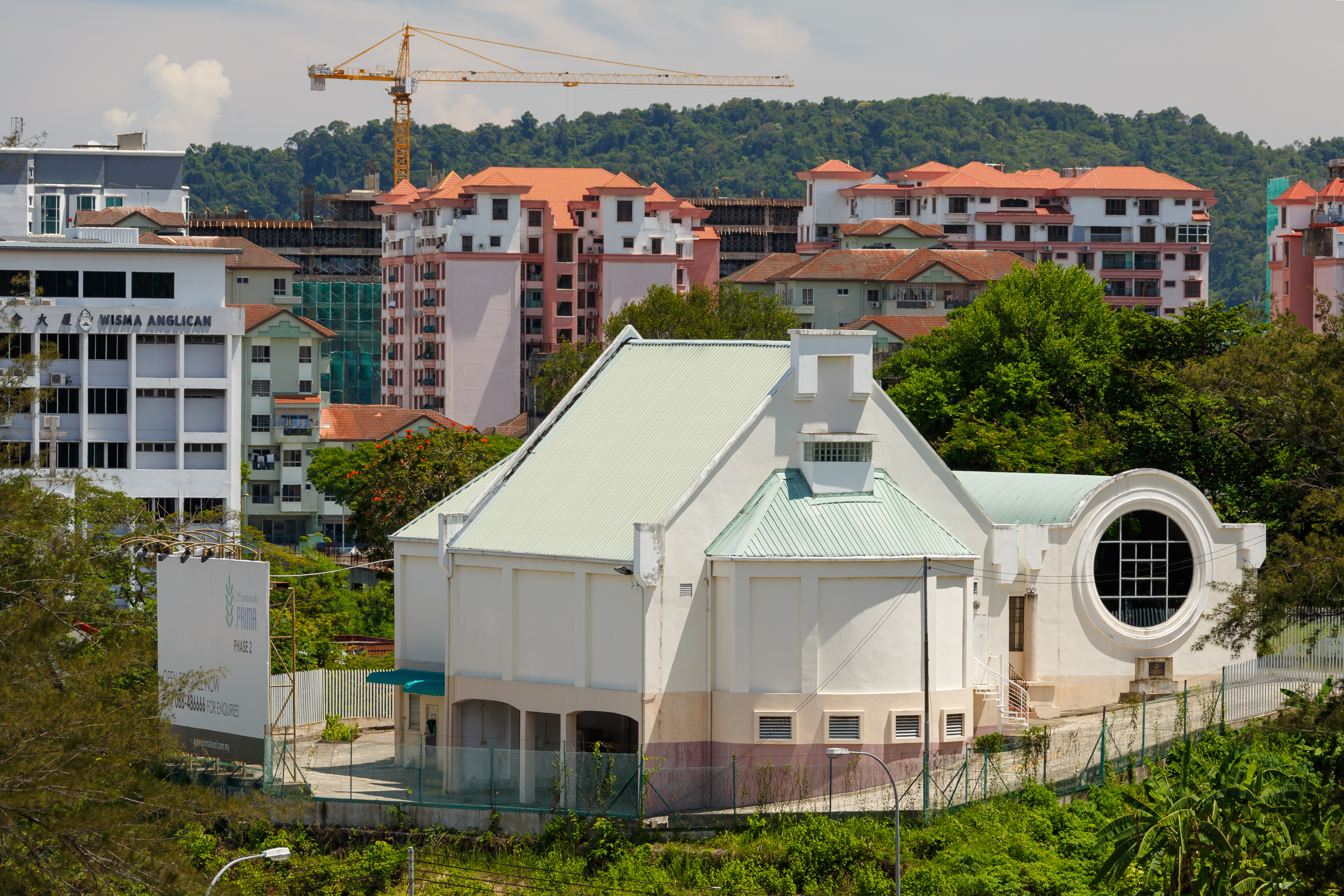
Jesselton Freemason Hall in Kota Kinabalu, Sabah, Malaysia.

Freemasonry started in Malaysia 180 years ago and was first established on the island of Penang. There are freemason lodges in all states in Malaysia except Terengganu, Kelantan and Perlis. The largest freemason lodge in Malaysia is located in Bukit Jalil.

== Pakistan ==
Masonic Temple (Lahore)

Freemasonry was introduced to Pakistan during the era of the British empire. Masonic organisations continued in the country until they were completely ousted in 1972 by Zulfiqar Ali Bhutto and again by Zia-ul-Haq in 1983.

The Sindh Wildlife Conservation building in Saddar, Karachi, served as a Masonic hall until it was taken over by the government. The Masonic Temple in Lahore, built in 1860, has been renamed to Mason Hall and is today used as a multi-purpose government building by the Government of Punjab.

== Philippines ==
Currently there are three different major jurisdictions existing in the Philippines, and LE DROIT HUMAIN representing gender inclusive Freemasonry, to wit:

(1) Gran Logia Soberana del Archipielago Filipino (GLSdAF)

           Supremo Consejo del Grado 33° 
      R∴E∴A∴yA∴ del Gran Oriente de Filipinas

Website: https://granlogiasoberanaph.com/

Address: RIZAL MASONIC TEMPLE

1316 Cavite St. Tondo, Manila, Philippines

Brief History of Gran Logia Soberana del Archipielago Filipino

On January 12, 1889, the Hispanico-Filipino Association was inaugurated in Madrid. The association was headed by the illustrious Grand Master Miguel Morayta and was composed of distinguished Spanish and Filipino Masons. The primary objective of the association was to fight for reforms in the Philippines, inspired by the Masonic principles of liberty, equality, and fraternity. According to pages 215-216 of the Master Mason's ritual, 1906 Edition, of the Ancient and Accepted Scottish Rite, Ohras Masonicas Oficiales, Volume III, the Grande Oriente Español established several lodges in the Philippines in 1889. However, these lodges were forced to operate in secrecy due to the power of the friars. In 1892, the Nilad Lodge in Manila was issued a charter by the Grande Oriente Español and several other workshops were established shortly thereafter. By the end of 1895, the Philippines had twenty-four lodges, a triangle, and a chamber of Knights of Kadosh. Unfortunately, the revolution that began in 1896 and ended with the United States taking control of the islands led to the dissolution of nearly all the lodges due to persecution and suffering. Despite this, the Modestia Lodge was able to survive and continue the Spanish Masonic tradition in the Philippines. Three lodges, one triangle, and a Rose Croix Chapter operate in the Philippines under the Grande Oriente Español. The Grand Orient of France and the Grand Lodge of California also have lodges in Manila, but the work of the lodges of the Grande Oriente Español soon lead to the development of Masonic doctrines throughout the country.

Organization of the First Grand Logia Regional of the Philippines

As per the esteemed Constitution of the Gran Logia Soberana del Archipelago Filipino, it is stated that the first Regional Grand Lodge of the Philippines was organized in June 1887. Ill.:. and Pot.:. Bro.:. Miguel Morayta, 33°, was the Assistant Grand Master and Acting Grand Master of the Spanish Symbolic Masonry of the Sovereign Grand Symbolic Lodges, under the auspices of the Gran Oriente de España. Later, on January 9, 1889, the organization took the title of Grande Oriente Español.

(2) Grand Lodge of the Philippines

(3) Gran Logia Nacional de Filipinas (Supremo Consejo del Grado 33 para Filipinas). https://glnf.ph/historia/

The latter is solely practicing the original landmarks of the Ancient and Accepted Scottish Rites (AASR); comprising with a none-ladderized 33 degrees.

The Grand Lodge of the Philippines was founded in 1912, it has 360 lodges with 16 500 members and is recognised by the United Grand Lodge of England. It had a pivotal role in the reestablishment of Freemasonry in Japan after World War II.

The Filipino Masons Gran Logia Nacional de Filipinas (National Grand Lodge of the Philippines) under the Supremo Consejo del Grado 33° para Filipinas is a member of International Confederation of United Grand Lodges (https://www.acaciamagazine.org/html/icucgl) founded by Timoteo Paez. The Supremo Consejo del Grado 33 para Filipinas (first in the far east) was incorporated on July 4, 1924, and proclaimed on December 30 with Timoteo Paez as Soverano Gran Commendador. It claimed jurisdiction over 27 Blue Lodges, one Lodge of Perfection, one Chapter Rosa Cruz, one Council of Kadosh and the corresponding Grand Consistory.

It cannot be doubted that Filipino Masons are always united in any patriotic move. In many instances, they have shown their common interest for nationalism, they have worked harmoniously for the betterment and aggrandizement of their country, which our national hero Jose P. Rizal, called "The Pearl of the Orient". In thirty seven revolutions against the foreign yoke, Filipinos fought as one single person. In our last struggle for freedom which the benevolent Americans had generously returned to us on July 4, 1946, we were united as ever.

Masonically, Filipino Masons whether belonging to Gran Logia Nacional de Filipinas or to the Grand Lodge of Philippines have common aspirations; ideal and spiritual love for their country not found nor may be expected from any alien who camr to the Philippines for fortune's sake.<ref; History of Freemasonry in the Philippines, Logia Magdalo-General Emilio Aguinaldo, Gran Logia Nacional de Filipinas, Supremo Consejo del Grado 33° Para Filipinas (undated pamphlet)

Freemasonry for Men and Women LE DROIT HUMAIN

The first Symbolic (Craft) Lodge of LE DROIT HUMAIN was consecrated in the Orient of Kawit Cavite in November, 2022. Since then, a second Lodge has opened on Mindanao Island in February, 2024. There a plans to open Lodges in the near future in northern Manila and in Cebu City.

The first Symbolic (Craft) Lodge of LE DROIT HUMAIN, Worshipful Lodge La Independencia, was consecrated in the Orient of Kawit Cavite in November, 2022. Since then, a second Lodge, Worshipful Lodge Talakudong has opened in the Orient of Tacurong (Mindanao), in February, 2024. There a plans to open Lodges in the near future in northern Manila and in Cebu City.

As gender-inclusive, international Order that works the Ancient and Accepted Rite, LE DROIT HUMAIN offers an initiatory continuity from the 1°-33° to all Filipinas and Filipinos who meet membership requirements. LE DROIT HUMAIN works independently of other Masonic organisations, but equally seeks to manifest the greatest expressions of LIBERTY-EQUALITY-FRATERNITY. (Ref: https://ledroithumain.international/?lang=en)

== Sri Lanka ==
Freemasonry was introduced in Ceylon by the British in the early 1800s. Currently there are ten English Lodges, two Scottish Lodges and four Irish Lodges in Sri Lanka. Most are based at the Victoria Masonic Temple at Galle Face, Colombo while others are based at the Kandy Masonic Temple in Kandy; the New Masonic Temple in Nuwara Eliya and the Masonic Temple of Kurunegala.

== Thailand ==
After several rocky starts, Lodge St John (Scottish Constitution) was founded in Bangkok on January 24, 1911. One century later there are lodges from the United Grand Lodge of England, Grand Lodge of Ireland, Grand Lodge of Scotland, Prince Hall Grand Lodge of Delaware, Grand Orient of the Netherlands, National Grand Lodge of France (GLNF) and the Grand Lodge of France (GLdF). Lodges from GLdF are not recognized by the other lodges in the kingdom. ]

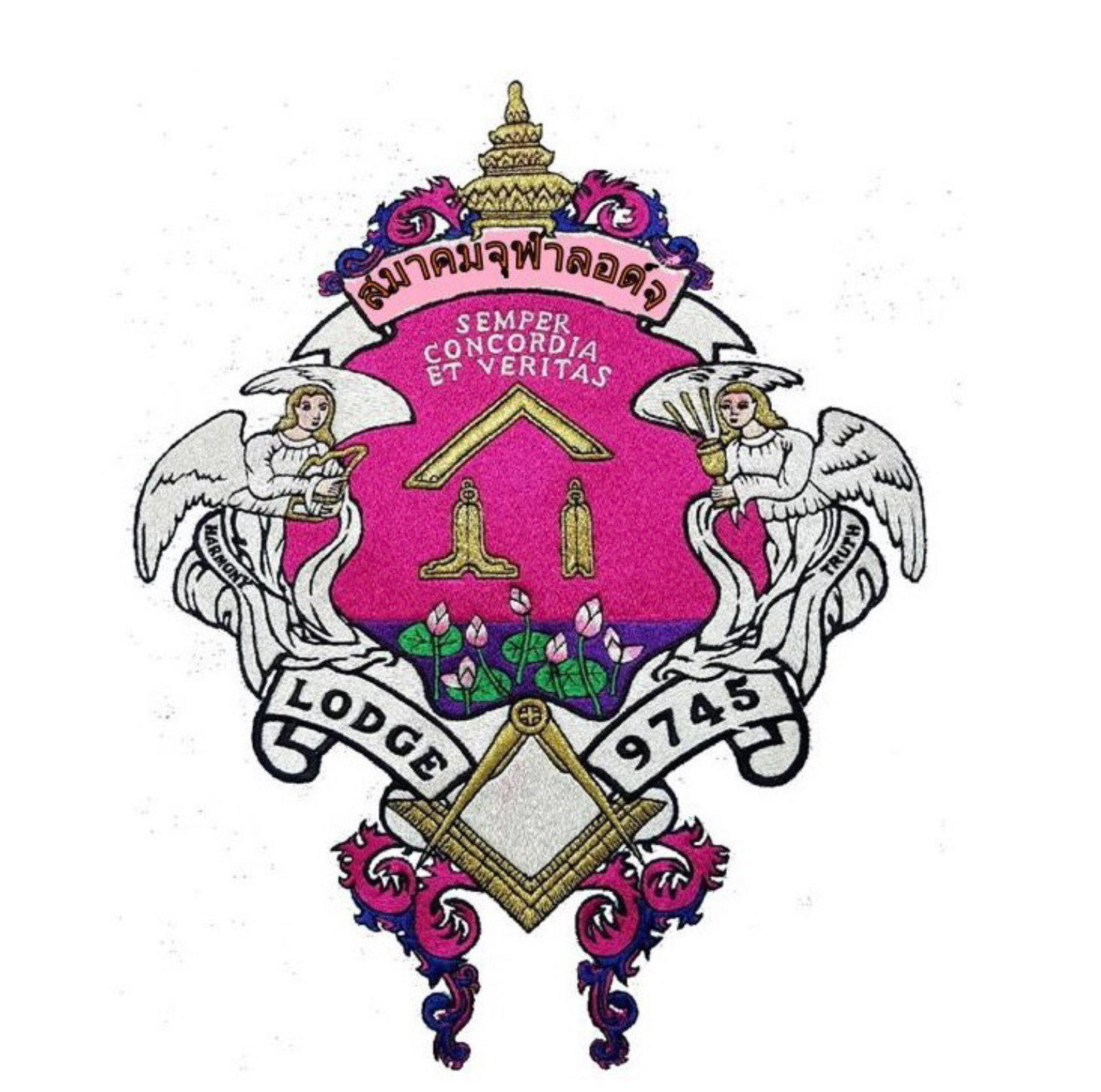

Chula Lodge 9745 E.C was the first UGLE. English Lodge consecrated in Thailand. Chula Lodge meets in Bangkok four times per year and as of 2014 there were two additional English lodges meeting regularly in Phuket and Pattaya. Chula Lodge's workings place great emphasis on the three Great Principles of Freemasonry; Brotherly Love, Relief and Truth and their meaning in the search for the missing secrets of a Master Mason.

As referred to above, Lodge Light of Siam 9791 E.C. is the second UGLE Lodge to be consecrated in Thailand, which meets in Phuket. The third UGLE Lodge in Thailand is Trident Lodge 9891 E.C. which meets regularly in Pattaya.

The only UGLE Royal Arch Chapter in Thailand, Siam Chapter 9891 E.C., meets in Pattaya, serving all Companions across Thailand.

== Turkey ==
In Turkey Freemasonry was introduced by foreign merchants in the eighteenth century (1721) and was outlawed by Mahmud I in 1748, although it slowly came back and Freemasons were exiled as part of a crackdown on the Bektashis in 1826.

Freemasonry was legalised as a part of the Ottoman reforms in the 19th century.

A Grand Orient was formed in 1909. Freemasonry was suppressed from 1935 to 1948.

A schism occurred in 1964, with a small group of freemasons creating the Grand Lodge of Liberal Freemasons of Turkey, which later attached itself to the Grand Orient de France
