= Charing Cross, Lahore =

Road intersection in Punjab, Pakistan

Coordinates: 31.559°N 74.324°E

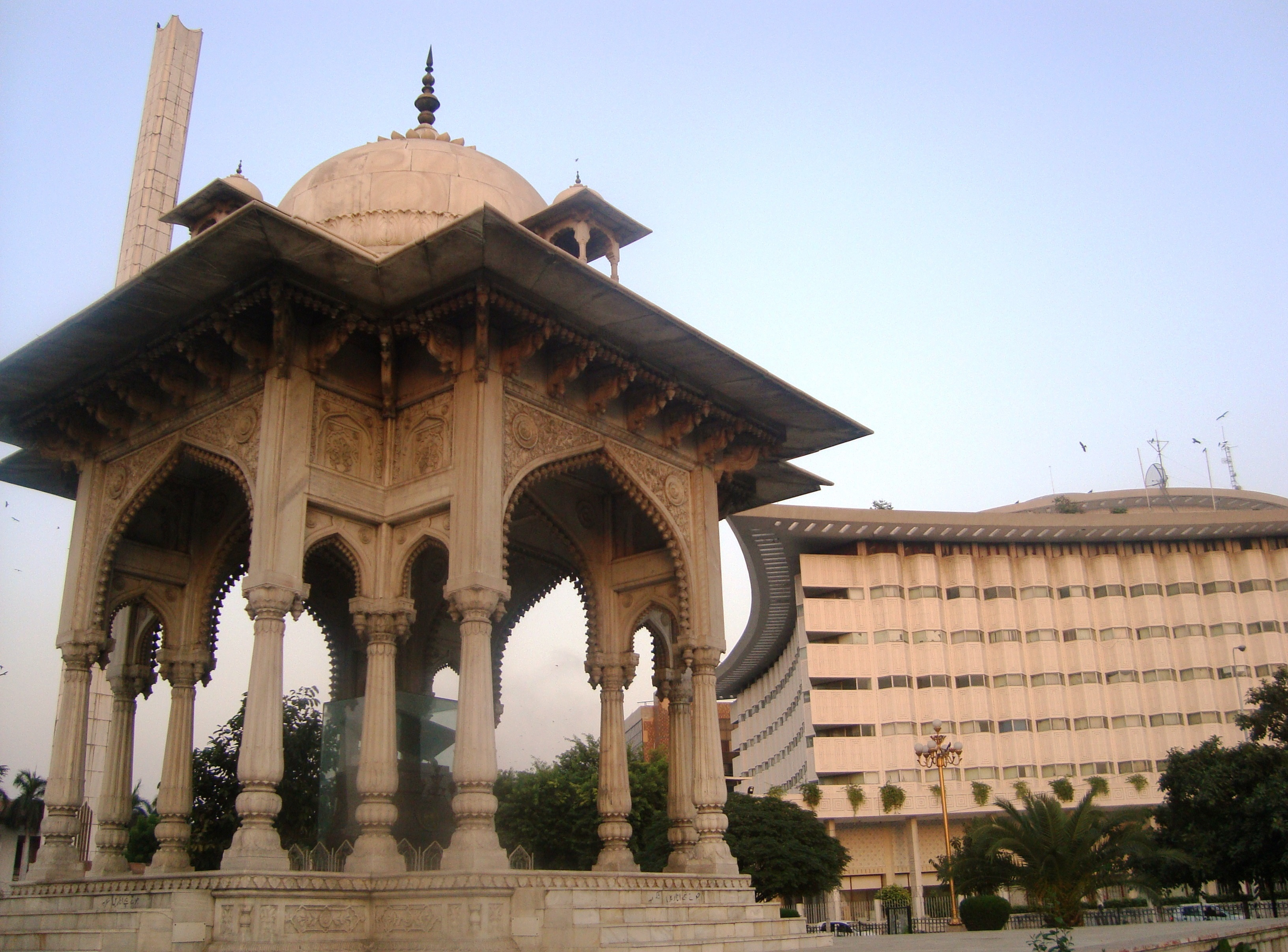
The Islamic Summit Minar was built near the Charing Cross Pavilion, which once housed a statue of Queen Victoria.

Charing Cross, officially known as Faisal Chowk, is a major road intersection in Lahore, Punjab, Pakistan. Located on Shahrah-e-Quaid-e-Azam, it is a popular site for protests within Lahore.

== History ==
The area was part of Donald Town, a neighborhood named after Sir Donald McLeod, who served as Lieutenant-Governor of Punjab between 1865 and 1870. The planned intersection was developed at a juncture between Queens', Montgomery and Mall roads. It came to be known as Charing Cross, which historians believe is after Charing Cross in London. The name is recorded in a 1908 publication by G.R. Elmslie titled “Thirty Five Years in the Punjab” (1908, Edinburgh). A 1918-19 ‘B&R Report’ refers to it as the ‘Charing Cross Scheme’.

A white marble pavilion, designed by Bhai Ram Singh, was constructed at Charing Cross in 1901 to mark Queen Victoria's jubilee as the first Empress of India. A bronze statue of Victoria, cast in London in 1900, stood at the site in the pavilion from 1904 until 1951, when it was replaced by a model of the Quran. The statue now stands at Lahore Museum.

To commemorate the 2nd Islamic Summit Conference held at Lahore in 1974, the Islamic Summit Minar was constructed at the site. In 1981 Charing Cross was officially renamed Faisal Chowk to honour King Faisal of Saudi Arabia. In February 2017 a suicide bomber murdered at least 14 people at a protest in the area.
