= Anarkali Bazaar =

Coordinates: 31°34′0″N 74°18′58″E

Anarkali Bazaar اناركلى بازار
- Bazaar
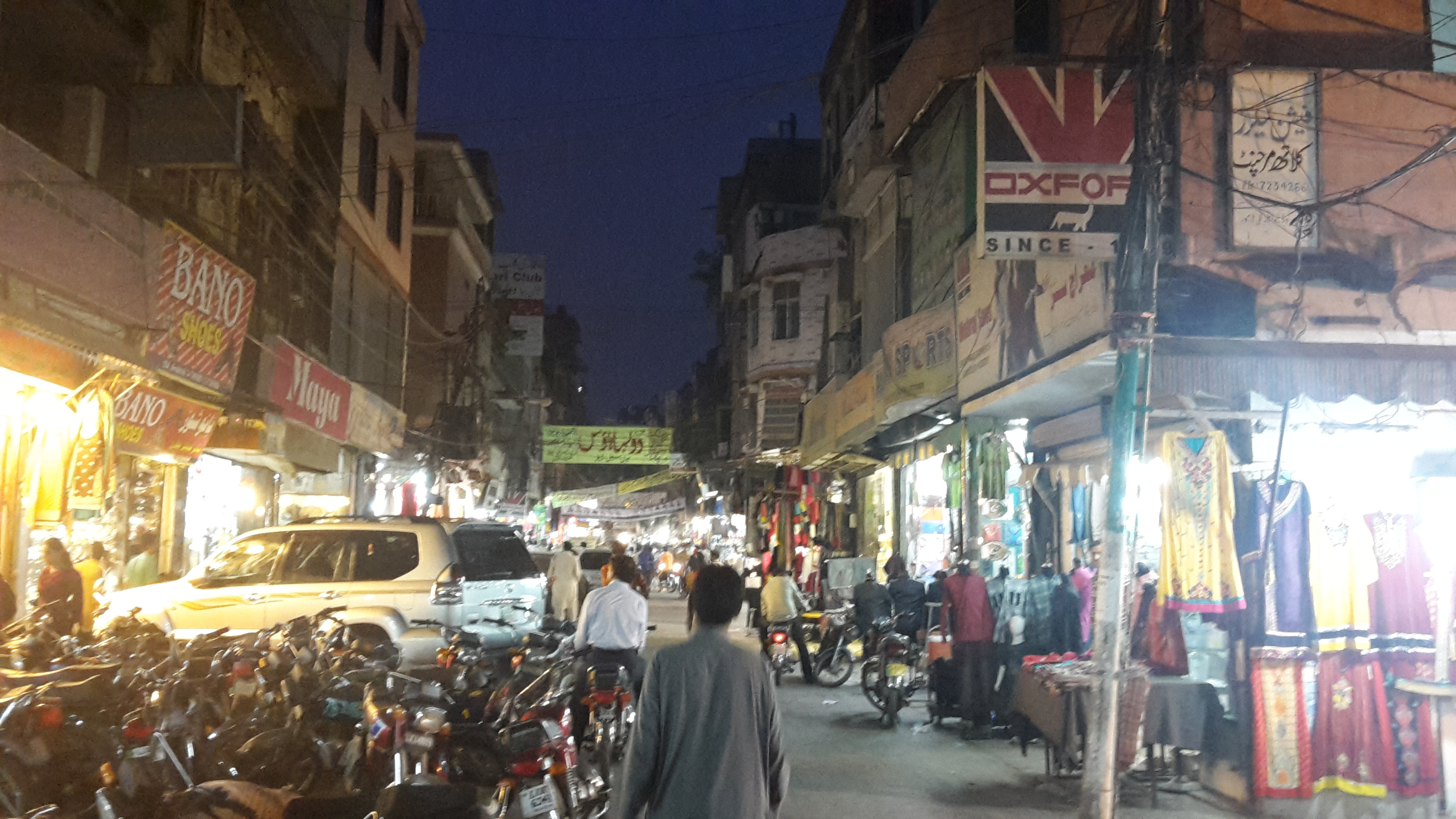
- Street view of the bazaar
- Interactive map of Anarkali Bazaar
- Country: Pakistan
- Province: Punjab
- City: Lahore
- Tehsil: Lahore City

Anarkali Bazaar (Punjabi, Urdu: اناركلى بازار) is a major bazaar in Lahore, Punjab, Pakistan. Anarkali also serves as a neighbourhood and union council of Lahore City Tehsil of Lahore. It is situated in the region that extends from the south of Lahori Gate of the Walled City to across the Mall Road. The bazaar also hosts the 1200 year old Valmiki Mandir.

The bazaar was listed in the 2020 World Monuments Watch by the World Monuments Fund to highlight the urgent need for its preservation and protection, since it is currently endangered due to neglect.

== History ==
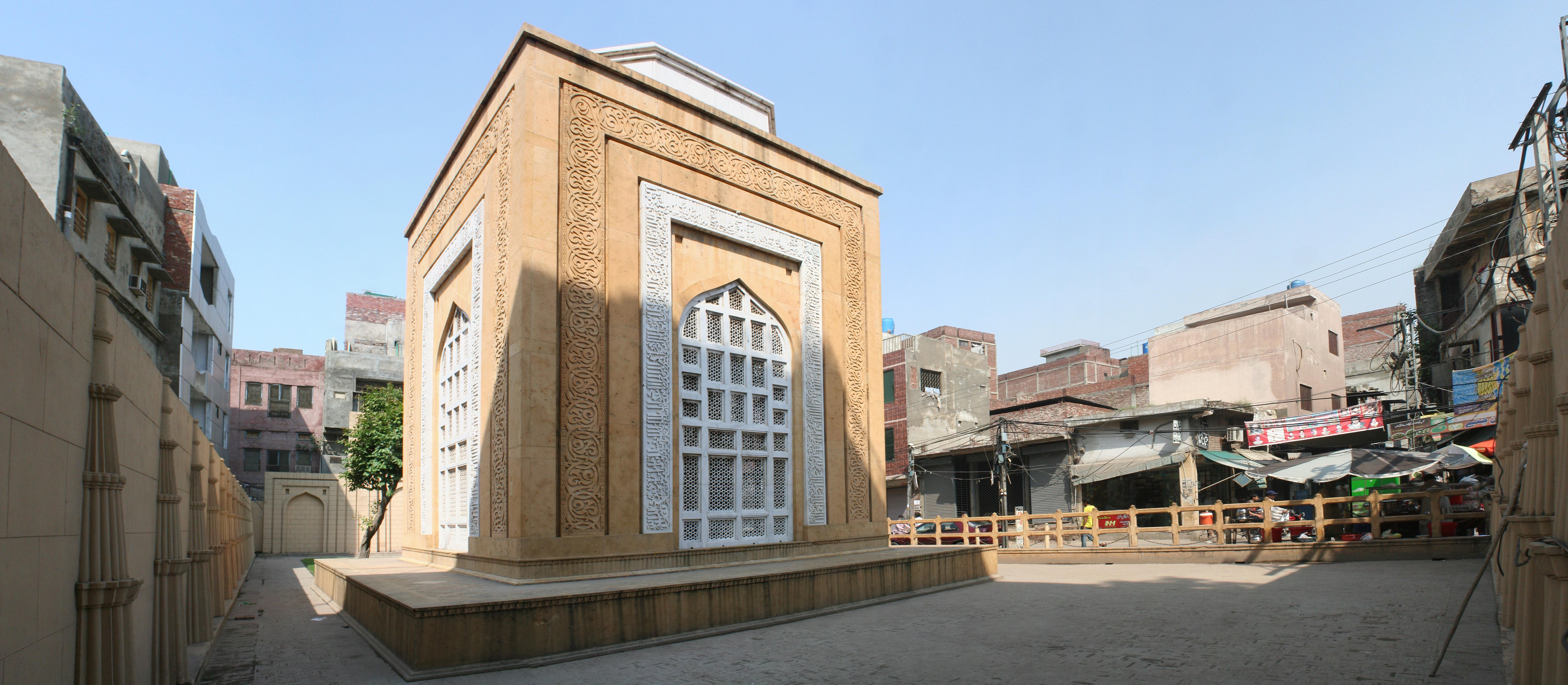
The mausoleum of Sultan Qutb ud-din Aibak of Mamluk Sultanate, in Lahore, renovated in the early 1970s.

The Anarkali bazaar is one of the oldest surviving markets in the Indian Subcontinent, dating back at least 200 years. It derives its name from the nearby mausoleum thought to be that of a tawaif named Anārkalī, who was 'chased out of town' by order of the Mughal Emperor Akbar for having a love affair with his son, Prince Salīm, who would later become Emperor Jahāngīr. Anarkali is reportedly buried in a building of Civil Sectt. Lahore, which is adjacent to Anarkali Bazar.

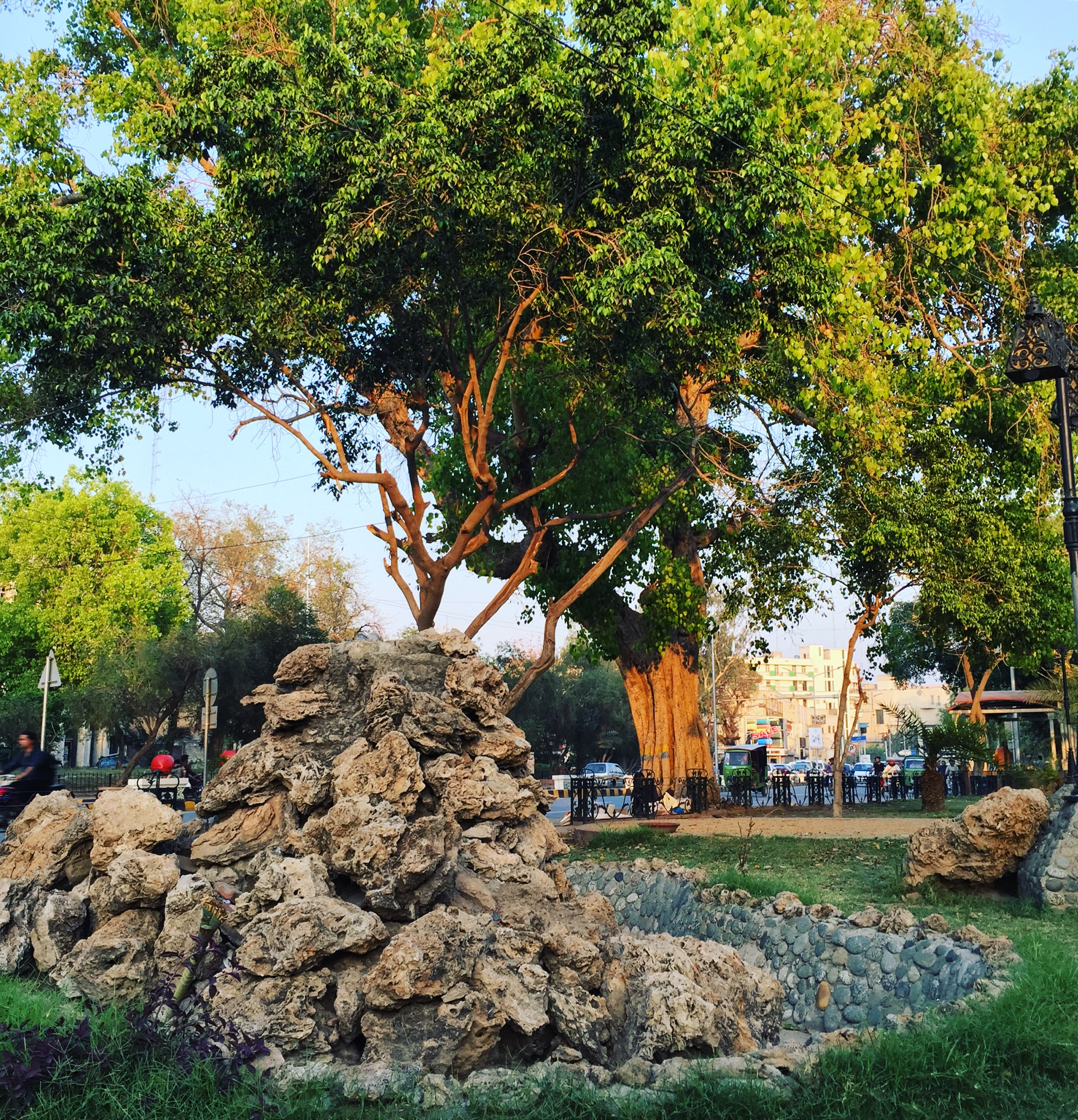
Green patch near Anarkali Bus Stop on Mall Road.

== Bazaar ==
Shops in Anarkali sell textiles, garments, jewellery, and many other items. The bazaar is now divided into two sections: the 'Old Anarkali Bazaar' and the 'New Anarkali Bazaar'. The former is noted for its traditional food items, and the latter for its traditional handicraft and embroidery. Within the New Anarkali Baazaar are markets known as Bano Bazaar, Dhani Ram Road, Jan Muhammad Road, Aabkari Road, Paisa Akhbar, Urdu Bazar, Aibak Road and Paan Gali. New Anarkali Bazar is also famous for halwa puri of Ghosha-e-Shireen, Zafar & Imam Din; nihari of Waris and siri paye of Nasir.

The mausoleum of Sultan Qutb ud-Din Aibak of Mamluk Sultanate is also located in Anarkali Bazaar. In the early 1970s, the mausoleum was renovated on the orders of the then Prime Minister Zulfiqar Ali Bhutto.

== See also ==
- S. Mohkam-ud-Din and Sons Bakers
- Naulakha Bazaar

== Bibliography ==
- Nevile, Pran. Lahore: A Sentimental Journey. India, Penguin Books, 2006.
