= The Mall, Lahore =

Major thoroughfare in Lahore, Pakistan

- Mall Road سڑک مال

Route information
- Maintained by City District Government Lahore
- Length: 6.5 km (4.0 mi)
- Existed: 2016–present

Major junctions
- From: Multan Road, Lahore Secretariat
- To: Mian Mir Bridge, Aziz Bhatti Road

Location
- Country: Pakistan

Highway system
- Roads in Pakistan

The Mall, also known as Mall Road, is a major thoroughfare in Lahore, Pakistan. Constructed following the Indian Rebellion of 1857, the road serves as the city's primary arterial corridor, linking the historic Walled City in the west to the civil and military lines in the east.

It is known for its colonial-era architecture, which evolves from Neoclassical and Neo-Gothic styles in the west to the syncretic Indo-Saracenic style in the east.

== History ==
The development of The Mall began in the area now known as Lower Mall, which pre-dated British administration. Key pre-colonial structures included the Civil Secretariat, originally built as the residence of General Jean-Baptiste Ventura, a French officer in the Sikh Khalsa Army. It was constructed within the garden of the Tomb of Anarkali, a Mughal-era mausoleum. Another major structure was the Sikh Horse Coach building, located near the Walled City; after the British annexation in 1849, this building was incorporated into Government College Lahore to serve as the institution's gymnasium.

Following the 1857 Rebellion, the British established their first cantonment in the Anarkali Bazaar area. However, security concerns regarding a military presence within a densely populated market led to the relocation of the cantonment. According to historical accounts, the new site was selected during a morning ride by the British Commander-in-Chief, Sir Charles Napier, and the colonial administrators Henry and John Lawrence. Napier identified a location five miles east, present-day Abid Majeed Road and Tufail Road, as the site for the Mian Mir Cantonment.

== Buildings ==
=== Western and Northern section of The Mall ===
The British administration prioritized the construction of educational, judicial, and public health institutions along the western section of The Mall. The southern side of Lower Mall saw the erection of the Town Hall, the Mayo School of Arts (now the National College of Arts), the Lahore Museum, the Punjab Public Library, and the Tollinton Market (originally the Great Exhibition Hall).

Opposite these, on the northern side, the administration built the Lahore District Courts, Government College Lahore, the Central Model School, Oriental College, and the University of the Punjab. These structures were initially designed in Neo-Gothic, Baroque, and Neoclassical styles, establishing a distinct European architectural footprint.

=== Eastward expansion and architectural evolution ===
As the road extended eastward toward the new cantonment, the architectural style began to incorporate local elements, resulting in a fusion of Gothic and Oriental designs. This section houses the General Post Office (GPO), the Lahore High Court (formerly the Chief's Court), the Telegraph Office, and the YMCA.

This zone also became a hub for missionary education, featuring the Cathedral School and Church, the Sacred Heart School, and St. Anthony’s High School and Church.

=== Charing Cross and Upper Mall ===
A focal point of The Mall is Charing Cross, named after the junction in London. This intersection was originally dominated by a marble canopy housing a statue of Queen Victoria. Following independence, the statue was removed to the Lahore Museum, and during the regime of General Zia-ul-Haq, it was briefly replaced by a wooden replica of the Quran.

Surrounding Charing Cross are several landmarks: the Freemasons' Hall, the Lahore Zoo, and the Lawrence Gardens (now Bagh-e-Jinnah). The gardens contain the Lawrence Hall and Montgomery Hall, which housed the original Lahore Gymkhana Club. Nearby is the Governor House, a sprawling estate that originated as a Mughal tomb and later served as a Sikh residence before being adapted by the British. Further east, the road passes Aitchison College, an elite boarding school, and the Government Officers Residences (GOR), before terminating at the Mian Mir Cantonment.

== Gallery ==
Masonic Temple

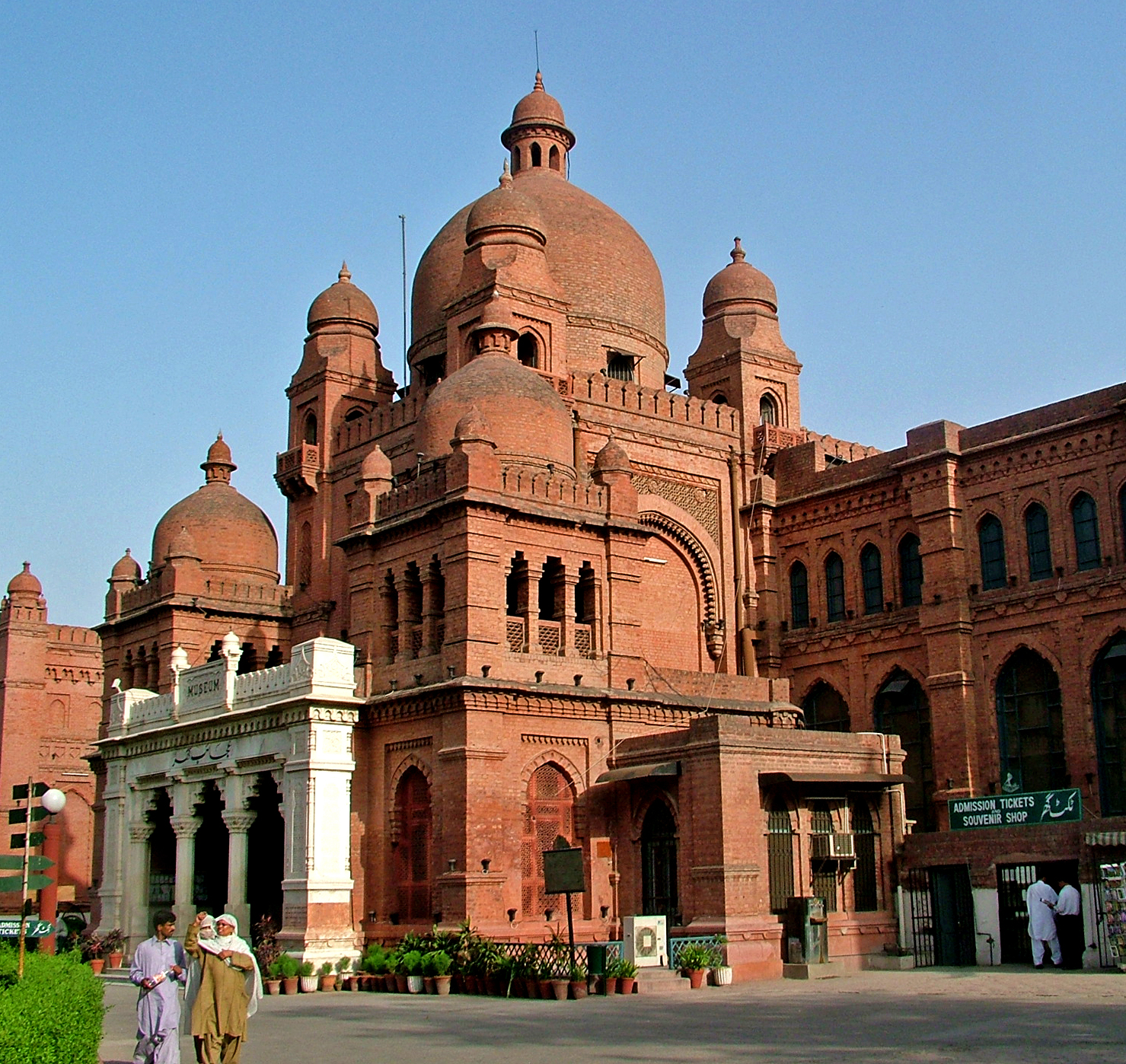
Lahore Museum

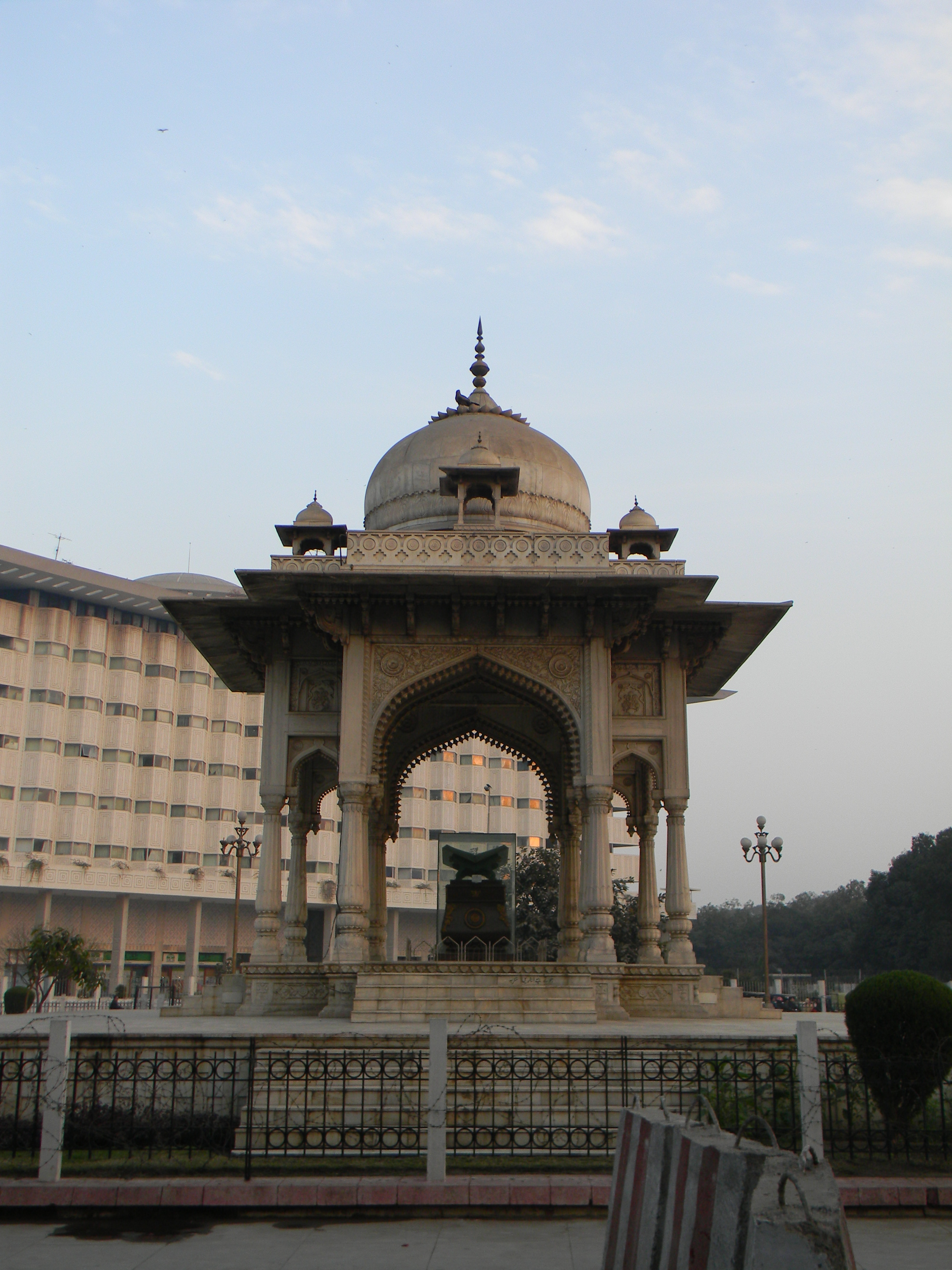
Charing Cross

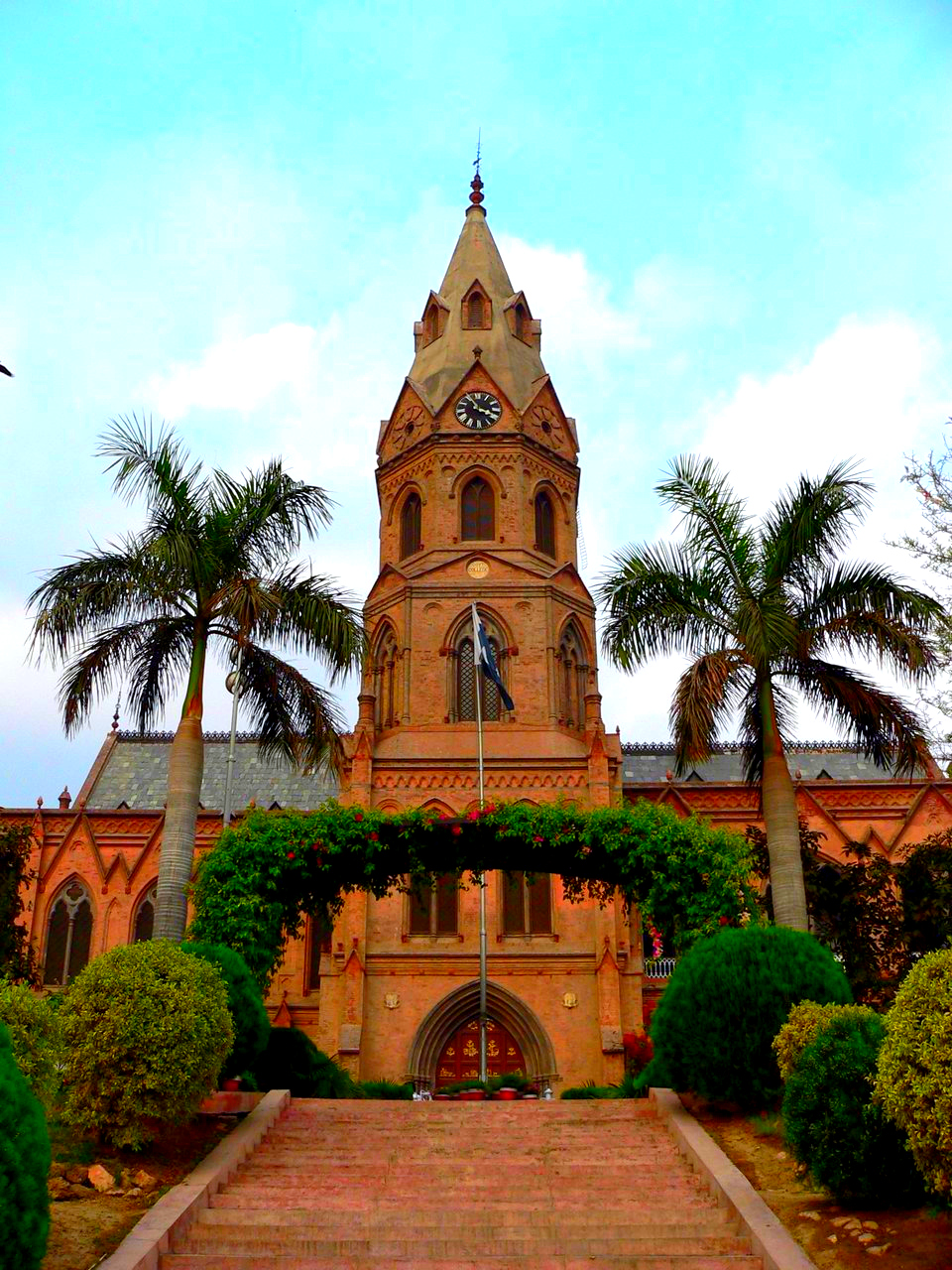
Government College University

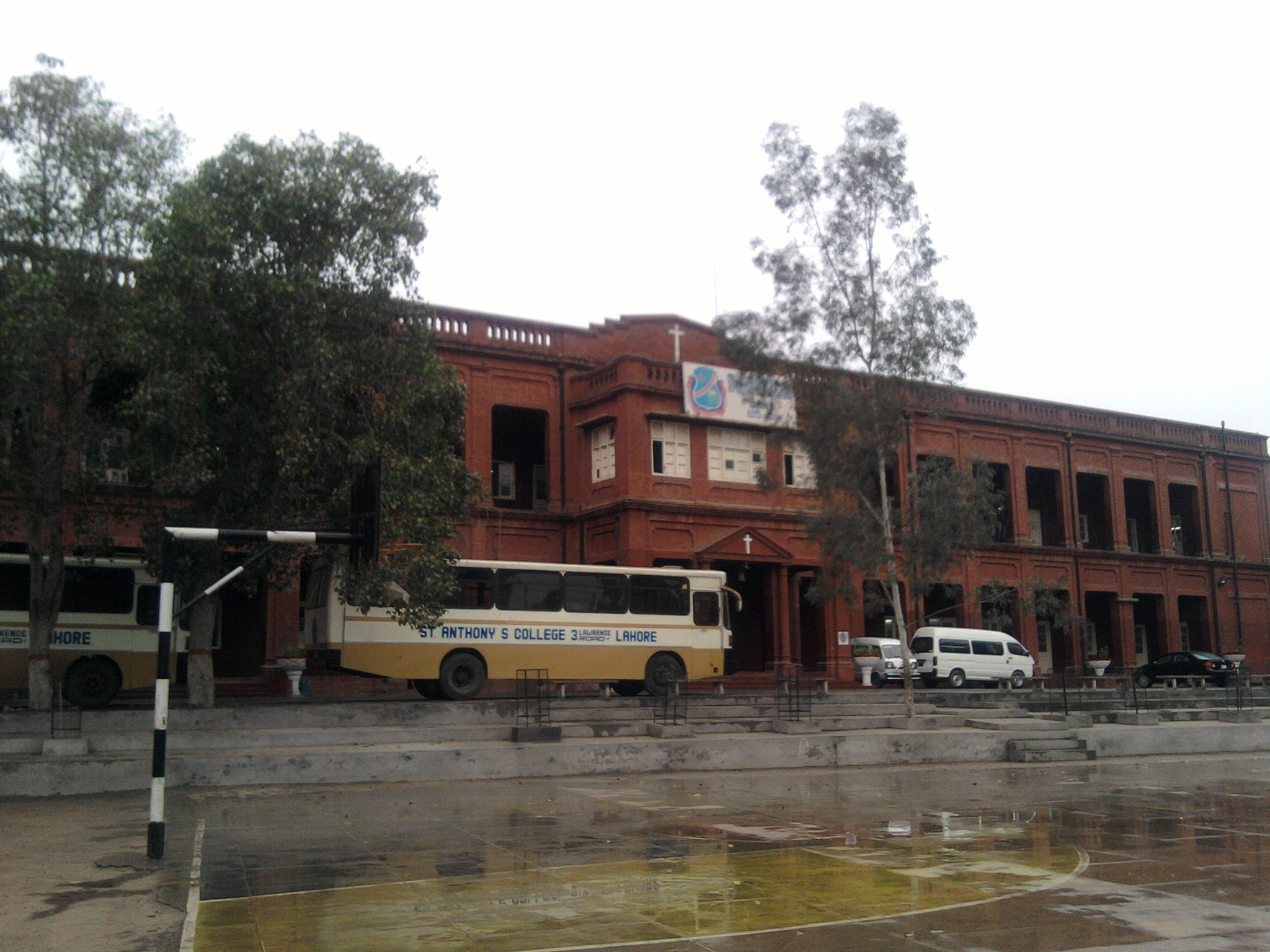
St. Anthony's College

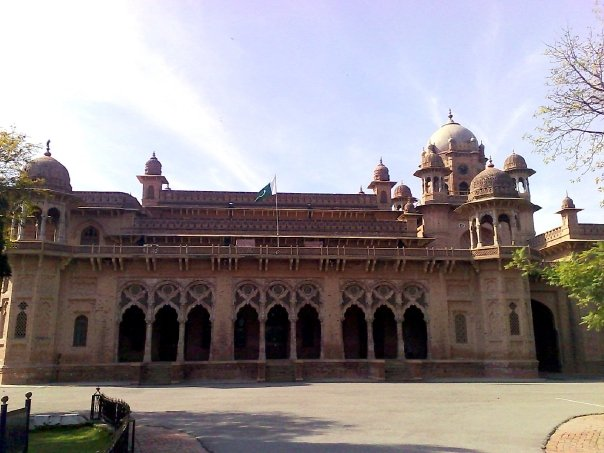
Aitchison College

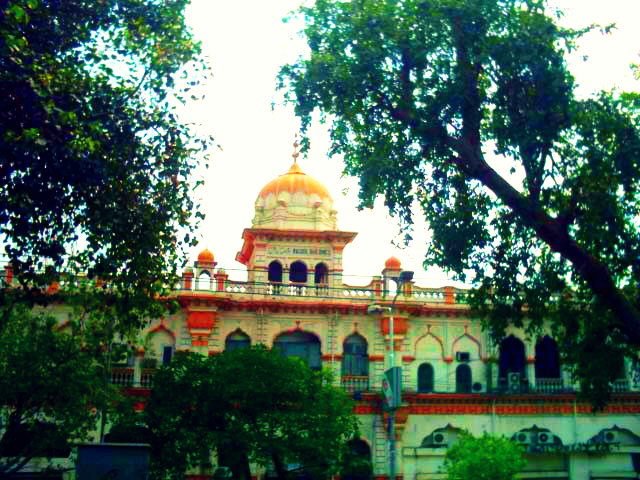
Ferozesons Books

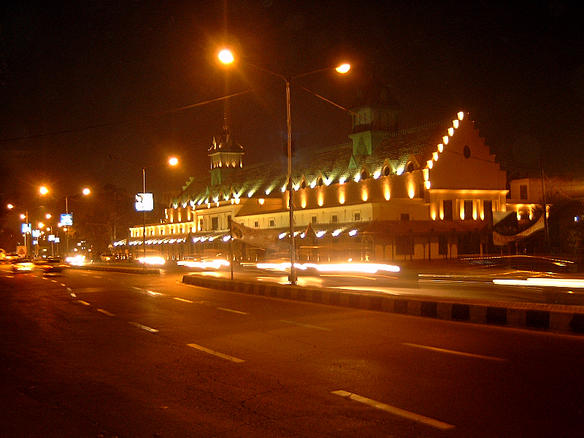
Tollinton Market

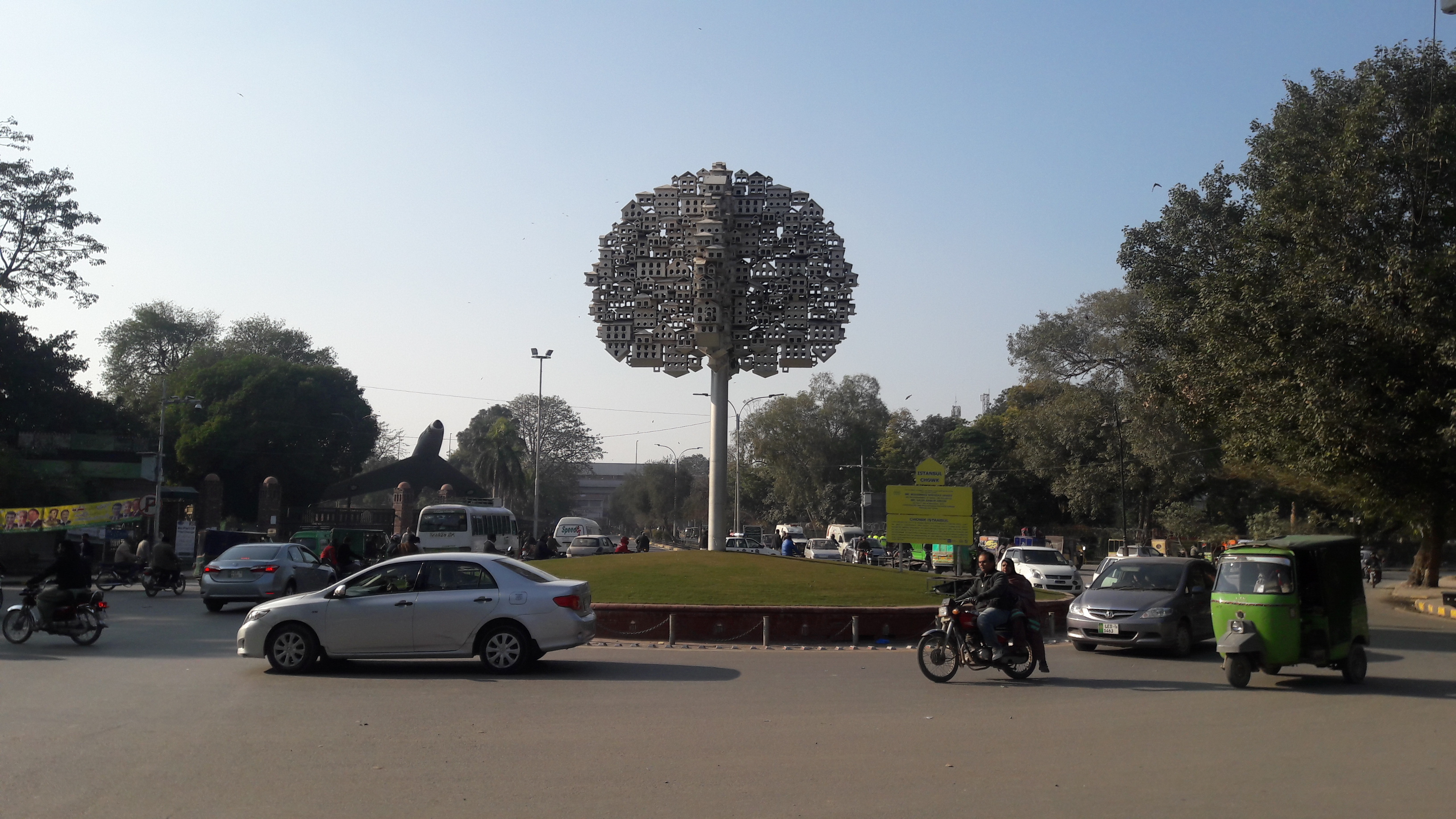
Bird Houses on Mall Road

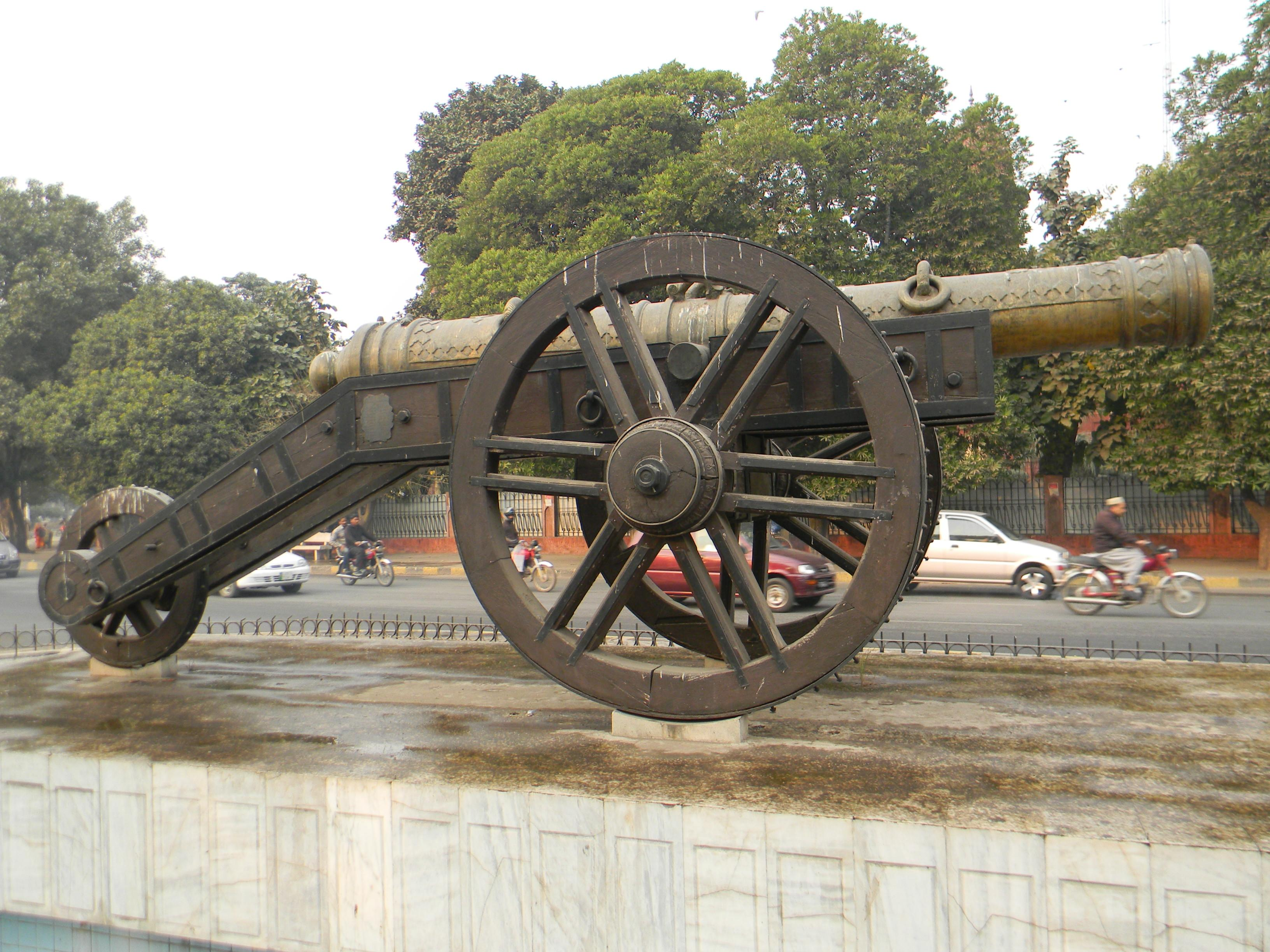
Zamzama

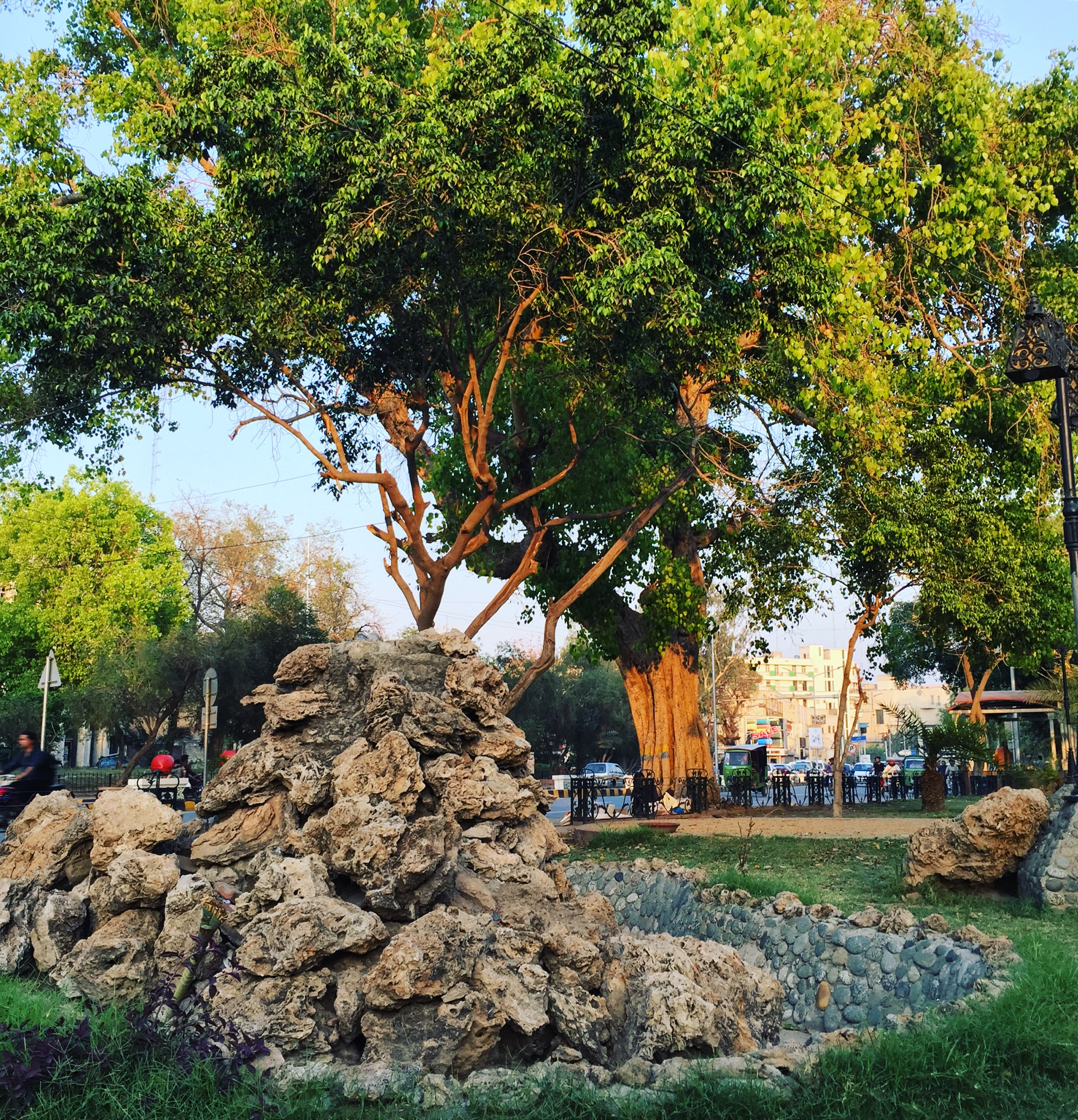
Anarkali Stop

== See also ==
- List of streets in Lahore
- Charing Cross
- Canal Bank Road
- Hall Road
