= Shopping in Lahore =

Shopping in Lahore is an important part of the social and economic culture of the city of Lahore, Pakistan. The South Asia largest and most spectacular mall Emporium Mall opened its doors on 30 June 2016.

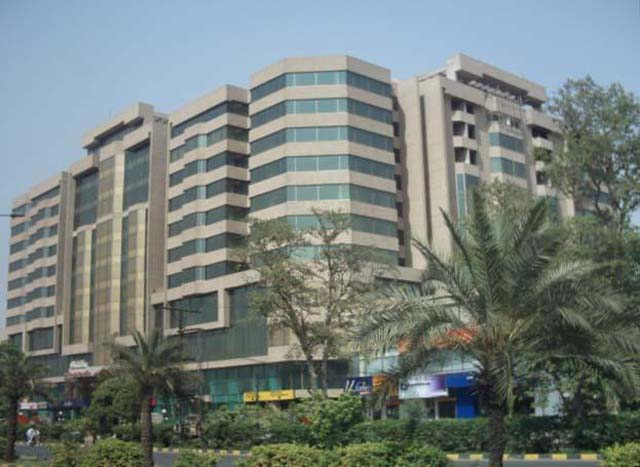
Siddiq Trade Center

== Markets ==
=== Arts, handicrafts and furniture ===
- Anarkali Bazaar
- Main Market Gulberg
- MM Alam Road
- Defence Housing Authority

=== Books ===
- Vanguard Books (Mall Road, near Regal Chowk)

=== Clothing and jewellery ===
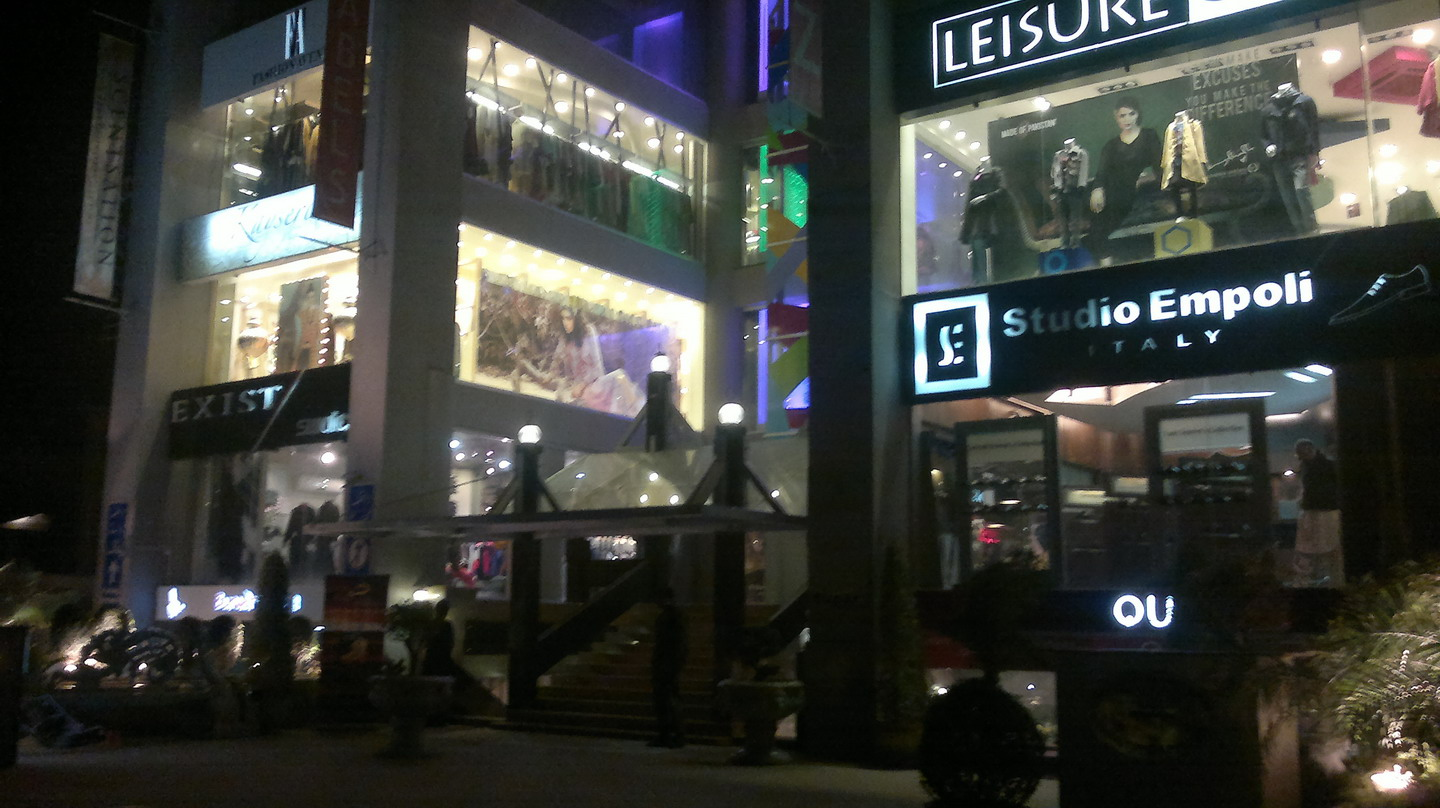
MM Alam Road

Designer

- Fortress Stadium
- MM Alam Road
- Mall of Lahore
- H-Block Defence
- Y-Block Defence

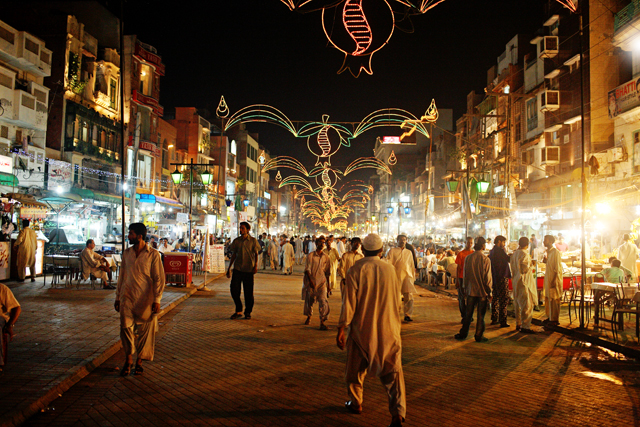
Anarkali Bazar

Normal

- Anarkali Bazaar
- Ichhra
- Mall Road
- Main Boulevard Gulberg

=== Electronics ===
- Hafeez Center in Gulberg
- Hall Road
- Cavalry Ground

=== Food ===
- Food Street, Anarkali
- Fort Road Food Street
- Food Street, Gawalmandi
- MM Alam Road
- Fortress Stadium shops
- Gaddafi Stadium shops
- H-Block Defence
- Y-Block Defence

=== Music ===
- Fortress Stadium consists of several music shops selling English-language music and movies, as well as a collection of Pakistani and Indian titles.
- Hall Road has music stores, with a higher proportion of Pakistani and Indian material.
- Langay Bazaar, situated close to the Lahore Fort sells musical instruments.
- Millat Music Palace

== Commercial zones ==
- Liberty Market
- Main Market Gulberg
- Mini Market Gulberg
- Model Town Link Road
- Garden Town Civic Centre
- Allama Iqbal Town Commercial Zone
- H-Block Defence
- Y-Block Defence
- Bahria Town Commercial Zone
- Sukh Chayn Gardens Commercial Zone

== Hypermarkets ==
- Metro
- Makro
- Carrefour (formerly Hyperstar)

== Shopping malls ==
- Packages Mall
- Emporium Mall
- Fortress Square
- Mall of Lahore
- Amanah Mall
- Gulberg Galleria
- Siddiq Trade Center
- Xinhua Mall
- Imperial Mall
- Pace Shopping Mall
- Vogue Towers
- Avenue Mall
- Al Fatah Malls (3 malls)
- Dolmen Mall
- Delivery pk
