= Chowk =

Chowk may refer to:

== Localities ==
=== In Bangladesh ===
- Chowk Bazaar, a bazaar in Lalbagh

=== In India ===
- Chowk, Prayagraj, a locality/township of Prayagraj, Uttar Pradesh
- Ashram Chowk, an intersection in Delhi
- Chandni Chowk, a market in Delhi
  - Chandni Chowk metro station (Delhi)
  - Chandni Chowk Flyover, a bridge
  - Chandni Chowk (Delhi Assembly constituency)
  - Chandni Chowk (Lok Sabha constituency)
- Chandni Chowk, Kolkata
  - Chandni Chowk metro station (Kolkata)
- Chawk Masjid, a mosque in Murshidabad
- Dharna Chowk, Hyderabad, an area in Hyderabad
- Hutatma Chowk, a square in South Mumbai
- IFFCO Chowk metro station, a metro station in Delhi
- Jawahar Chowk, an area in Ahmedabad
- Kali Charan Inter College, a college in Lucknow
- Kargil Chowk, a war memorial in Patna
- Lal Chowk, a square in Srinagar
- Neighbourhoods of Ranchi § Lalpur, an intersection in Ranchi
- Manek Chowk (Ahmedabad), a square and market in Ahmedabad
- Nana Chowk, a neighborhood in Mumbai
- Patel Chowk metro station in Delhi
- Connaught Place, New Delhi
  - Rajiv Chowk metro station
- Utsav Chowk, a landmark in Navi Mumbai

=== In Pakistan ===
- Chowk Azam, a city in Layyah District
- Chowk Yadgar a square in Peshawar
- Green Square, an intersection in Mingora
- Kalma Chowk, a town square and intersection in Lahore
  - Kalma Chowk Flyover, a bridge
- Pakistan Chowk, a culture heritage site in Karachi

== Films ==
- Chowk, 2023 Indian Marathi film by Devendra Gaikwad
- Chandni Chowk, 1954 Indian film by B. R. Chopra set in Chandni Chowk, Delhi

== Website ==
- Chowk.com, a website about current affairs, politics and cultural aspects of India and Pakistan

== See also ==
- Chowrangi, an Urdu word meaning crossroads
- Chaunk, a cooking technique and garnish used in the cuisines of India, Bangladesh, and Pakistan
