= Culture of Lahore =

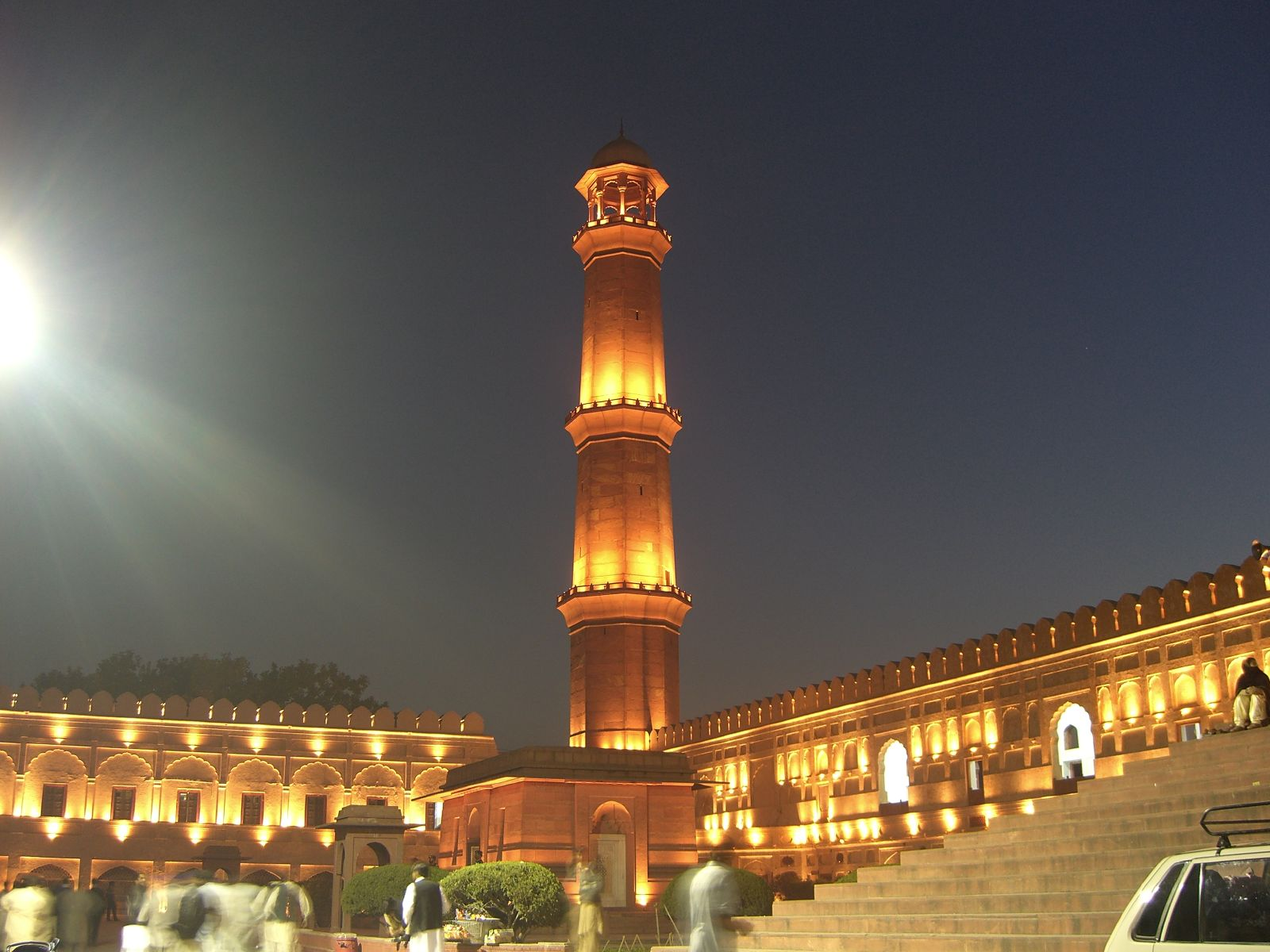
The Badshahi Mosque at night.

The culture of Lahori People is a manifestation of the lifestyle, festivals, literature, music, language, politics, cuisine and socio-economic conditions of its people. It is characterised by the blending of Punjabi, Middle Eastern, Central Asian and Western influences.

Lahore's culture is unique. It is sometimes referred as the cultural capital or the heart of Pakistan, the city was a seat of the Mughal Empire and the Sikh Empire as well as the capital of Punjab in Mahmud Ghaznavi's 11th century empire and in the British Empire. Presently, it is the capital of the Punjab province of Pakistan.

== History of culture ==
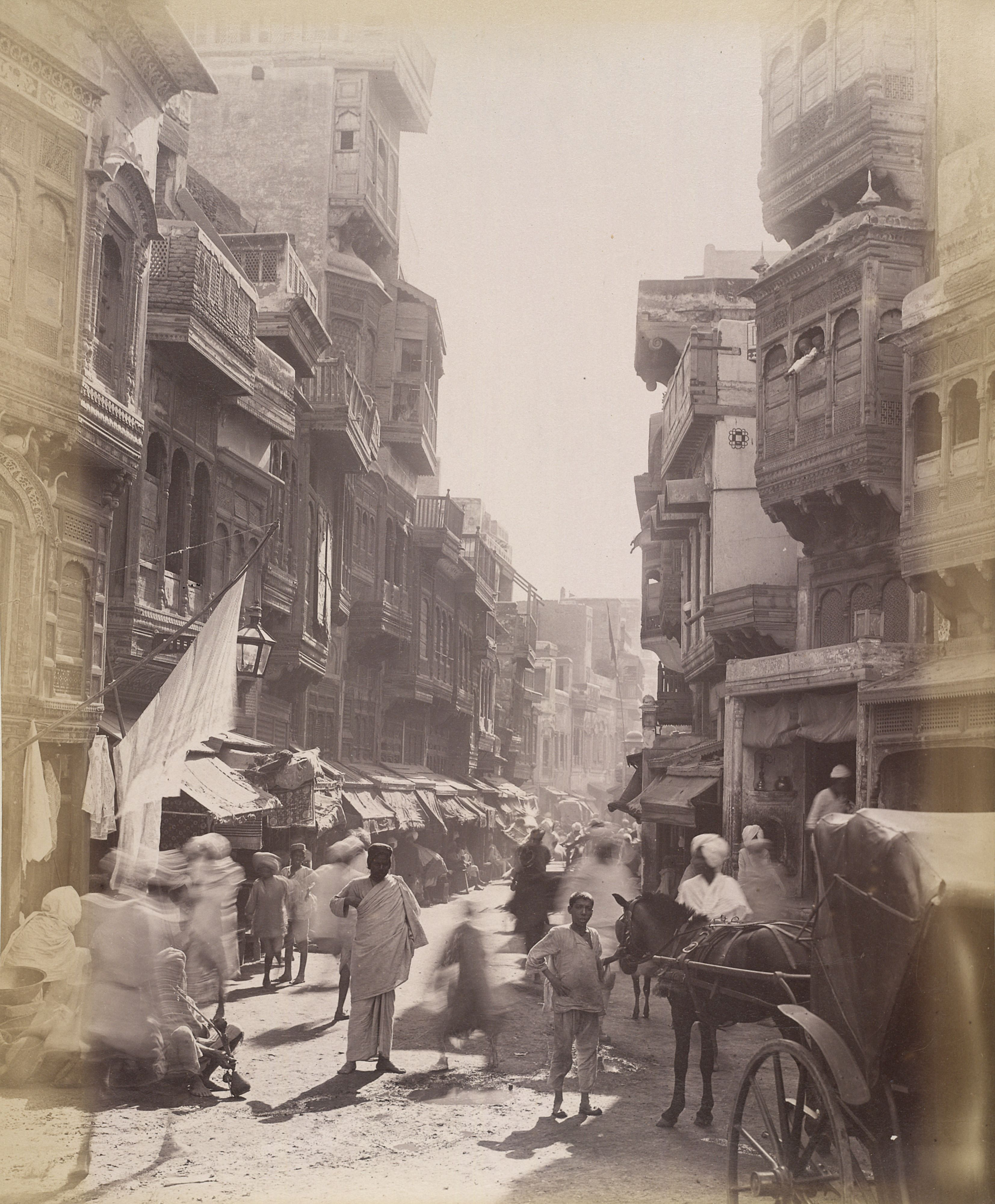
Street of Lahore in 1890s

Lahore has played an important role in Pakistani history. It was in this city that Pakistan's independence declaration was made. It was the largest city in the newly formed Pakistan at the time of independence and provided the easiest access to India, with its porous border near the Indian city of Amritsar only 48 kilometres (30 mi) to the east. Large numbers of Zoroastrians, Hindus, Sikhs, and Muslims lived closely in Lahore before the independence of Pakistan.

The city suffered revolts, demonstrations and bloodshed at the time of independence due to the enmity between Muslims and Hindus at the time and the uncertainty which loomed over the fate of Lahore even after India and Pakistan became independent. Lahore's culture, its history, institutions, food, clothing, films, music, fashion, and liberal community lifestyle attract people from all over the country.

The city has many significant connections with Sikhism and played an important part in the history of the Sikh Gurus. Guru Ram Das was born at Bazaar Chuna Mandi, Lahore in 1534 A.D. Guru Arjan Dev got the foundation stone of Harmandir Sahib, laid by a Muslim Saint Mian Mir Ji of Lahore in December 1588. Guru Arjan met an untimely death when he was tortured on the orders of the Emperor Jahangir in 1606 in this city. The Gurdwara Dehra Sahib and the Samadhi (Mausoleum) of Ranjit Singh are located in Lahore.

== Arts and architecture ==
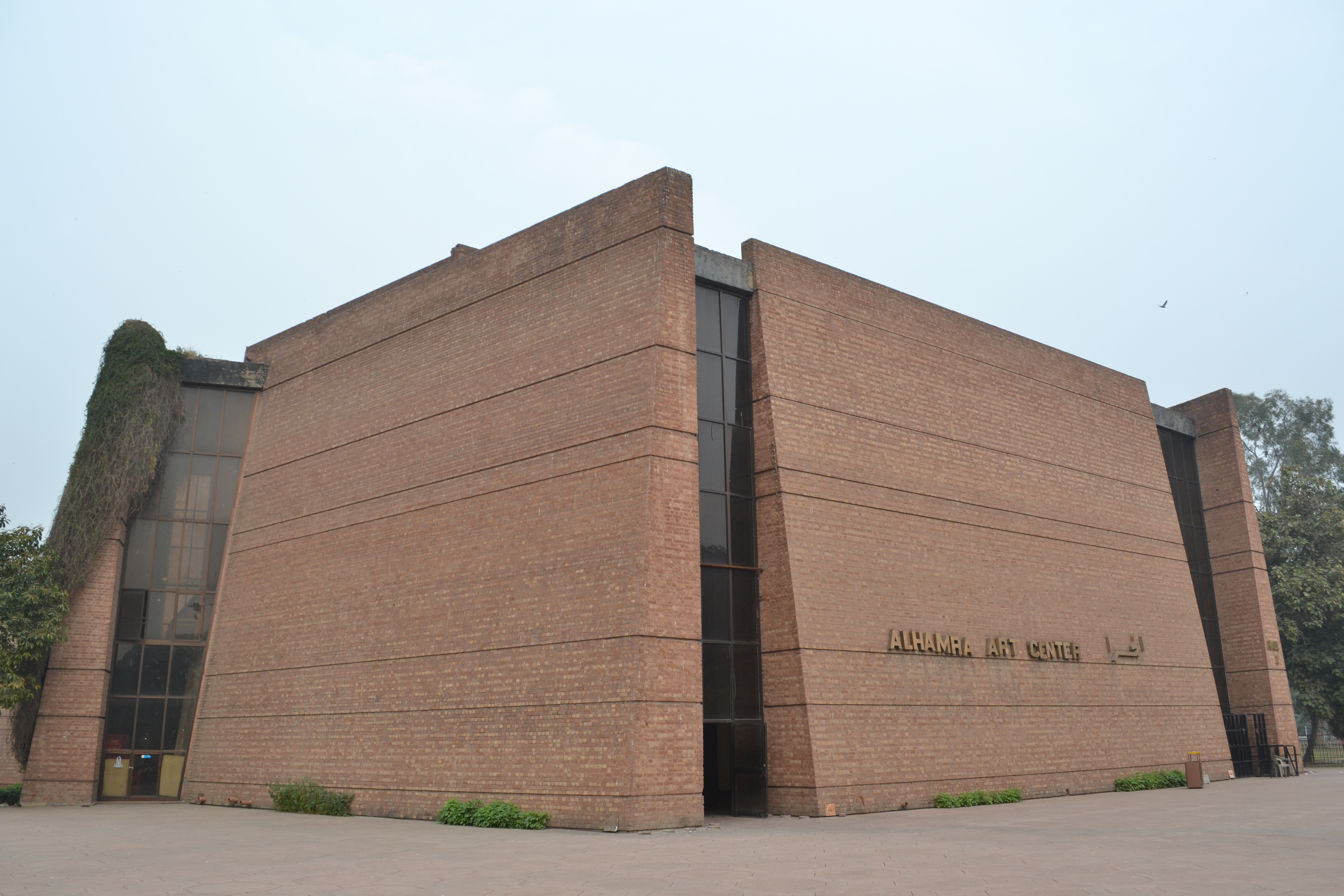
Alhamra Arts Council

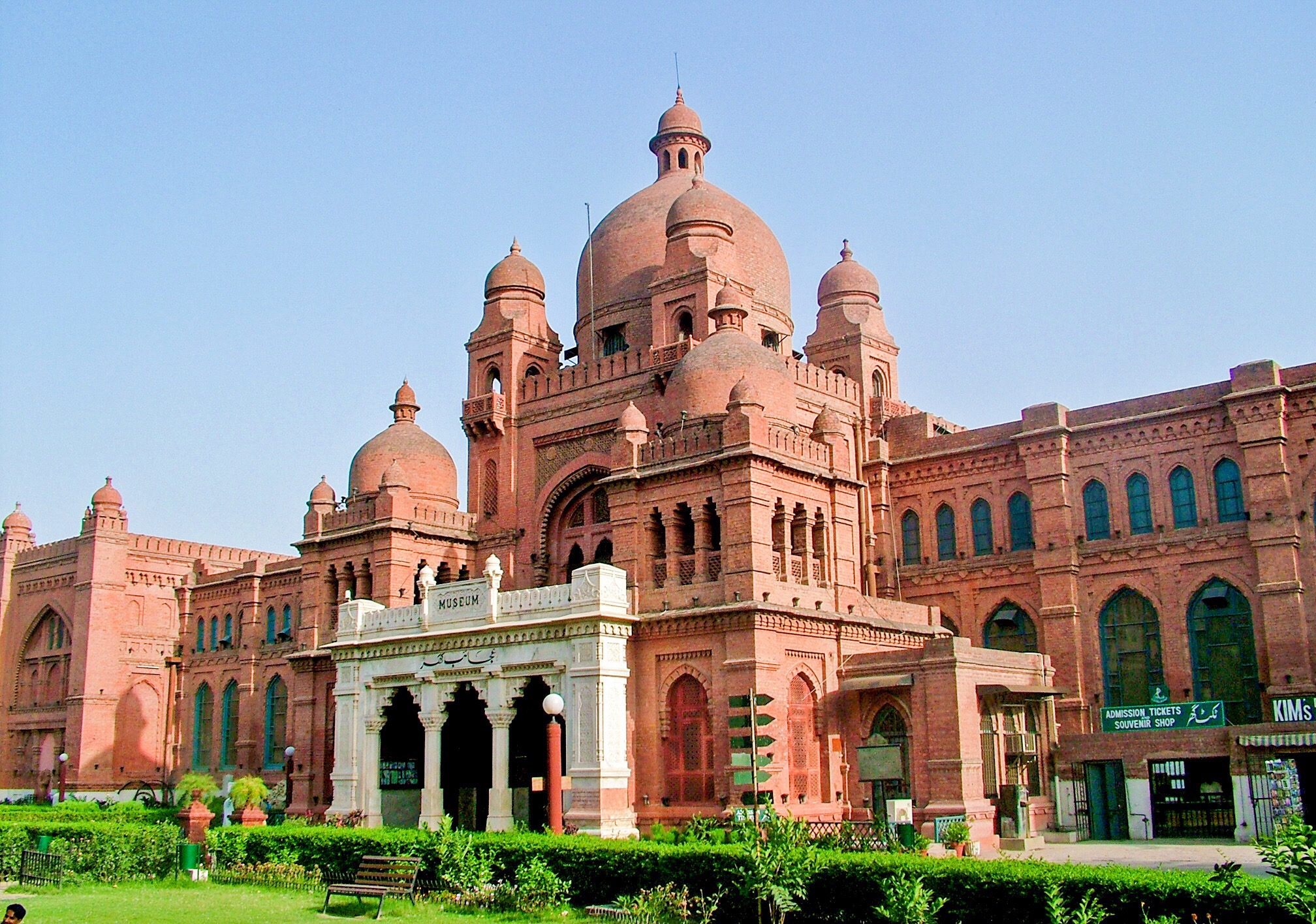
Lahore Museum

Art of Lahore has a strong bearing upon the Mughal period. The historical monuments and buildings of Lahore stand as the specimen of Mughal art and architecture. However, the heritage also has a touch of Aryans, Arabs, Persians, British, Sikhs and Greeks.

Lahore Fort, Badshahi Mosque, Shalimar Gardens, Nur Jehan's Tomb, Tomb of Jahangir, Tomb of Anarkali, The Lahore Museum, Chauburji or Char Minar and Bagh-e-Jinnah are some the major architectural works found in Lahore. The palaces/havelis, forts, madrassas and mosques make the Lahore art known among the rest of the world.

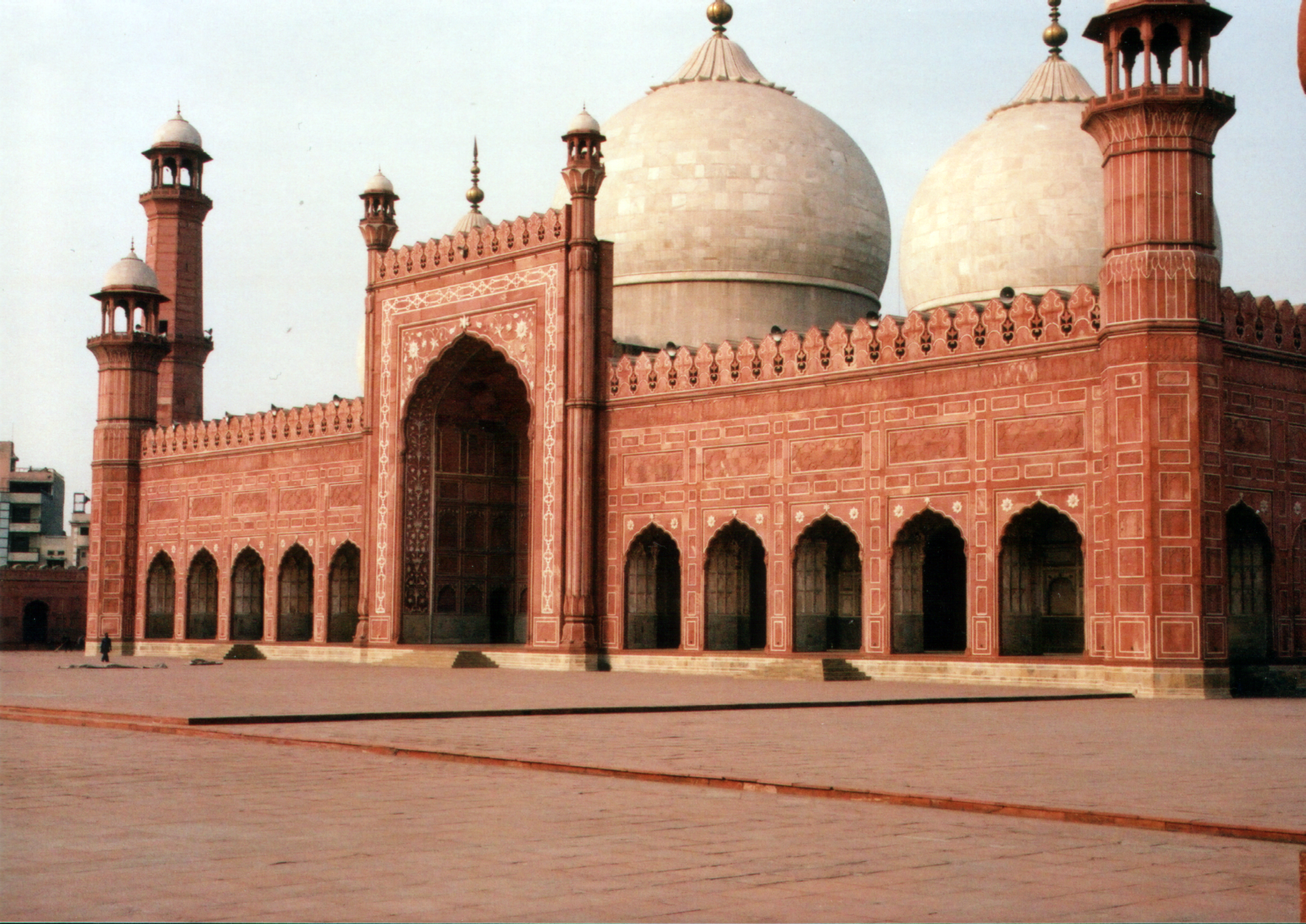
Badshahi Mosque

The art galleries of Lahore also display a number of artefacts belonging to the Mughal period. Many contemporary artworks are also exhibited in the art galleries of the city.

In modern days, parts of Bahria Town Housing Scheme in Lahore are themed on ancient Egyptian culture. There are many other architectural notables, including themes for different locales that make Bahria a very interesting and well conceived scheme to visit and live in.

The World Performing Arts Festival is held every autumn (usually in November) at the Alhambra cultural complex, a large venue consisting of several theatres and amphitheatre. This ten-day festival consists of musicals, theatre, concerts, dance, solo, mime, and puppetry shows. The festival has an international character, with nearly 80 per cent of the shows performed by international performers. On average 15–20 different shows are performed every day of the festival.

Lahore is also the centre of Pakistan's puppetry industry. Although not economically viable as a business, the Peerzada family like Faizan Peerzada has been arranging puppetry festivals for more than a decade, at one point even bringing the biggest festival in the world to Lahore. While, Ajoka Theatre and Independent Theatre Pakistan are the leading theatre companies in continuous production in Lahore.

Lahore's biggest contributor to the art scene is undoubtedly the National College of Arts, the country's, most prestigious art college, which has produced some of the country's most famous painters, writers, actors and musicians. There are also several art galleries throughout the city which hold exhibitions regularly among which the Drawing Room Art Gallery is the most popular.

== Landscape and gardening ==
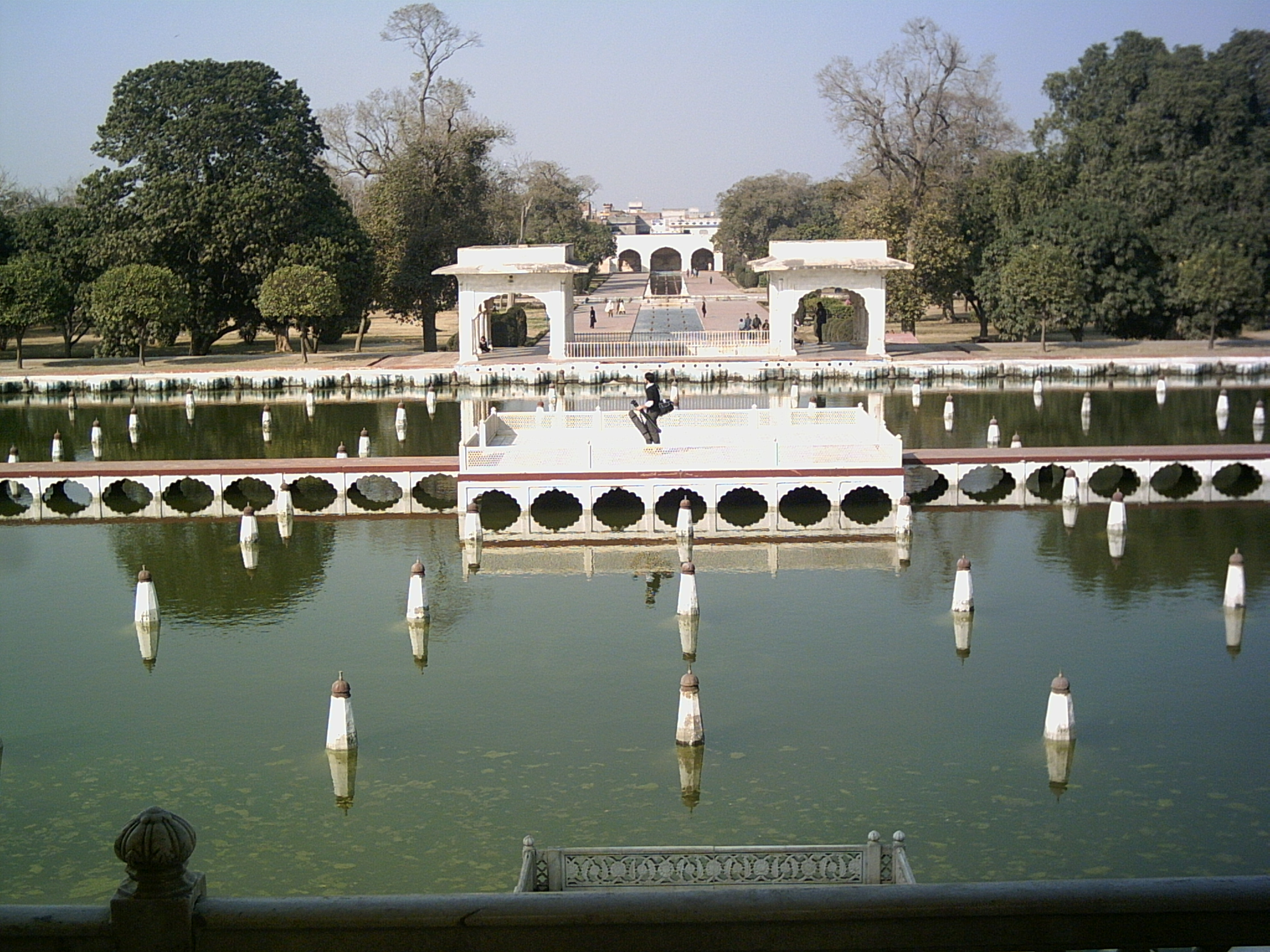
Shalimar Gardens, Lahore

There are scenic parks that are frequented by joggers, couples, children, students and seniors. Bagh-e-Jinnah (formerly known as Lawrence Gardens) is one such place; it has a large variety of gorgeous plants, trees, long and varied pathways and creative light effects. Landscape of historical gardens such as Shalimar Gardens, Hazuri Bagh and Shahdara Bagh are an evidence of beautiful Mughal art. Fountains are a very important indication of culture of Lahore. Almost every major roundabout (locally called 'chowk') has a combination of a fountain with floral decorations. Pakistan's national flower is Gardenia jasminoides (mononymously termed 'Jasmine') and carries great importance for the people of Lahore.

== Music and dance ==
Lahore's music ranges from classical and Sufi to folk, pop and rock. Musicians tied to the city or the wider Punjabi tradition include Noor Jehan, Farida Khanum, Amanat Ali Khan, Nusrat Fateh Ali Khan, Abrar-ul-Haq, Atif Aslam, Ali Zafar, Pappu Sain and Sain Zahoor. The city also has a strong link to Pakistani rock, through bands such as Junoon, Call and Entity Paradigm. Qawwali and Punjabi folk music are still performed there alongside contemporary pop.

Even though things have been on the down slide – given the worldwide economic recession and the security situation within the country – the local musicians have still managed to stay in the game by taking out albums (some of which are completely self-funded), and playing at concerts and gigs throughout the country.

Lahore is also famously known in the Indian subcontinent for its mujra dance, which originated in the courts of the Mughals and has been passed on through successive generations by traditional women practitioners.

== Cuisine ==
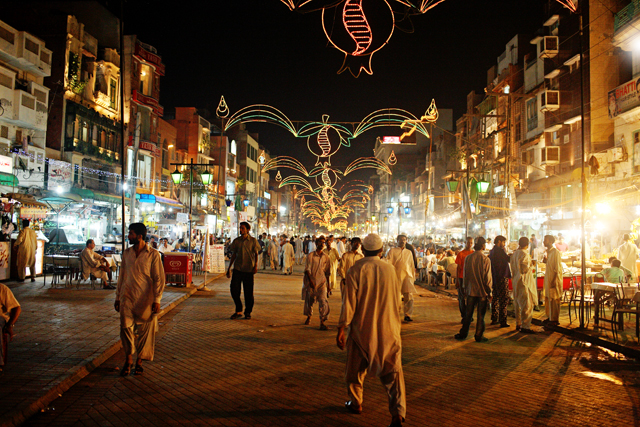
Food Street, Lahore.

Lahoris are known for their love of food and eating. While Lahore has a great many traditional and modern restaurants, in recent years Western fast food chains, such as McDonald's, Simply Sufi XPRS, Pizza Hut, Domino's Pizza, Subway Sandwiches, Dunkin' Donuts, Nando's and Kentucky Fried Chicken have appeared all over the city.

Recently the food streets in the historic locales of Lahore (Gawalmandi, Anarkali, and Badshahi Mosque) have attracted tourists. Food streets have undergone restorations and are cordoned off in the evenings for pedestrian traffic only; numerous cafés serve local delicacies under the lights and balconies of restored havelis (traditional residential dwellings).

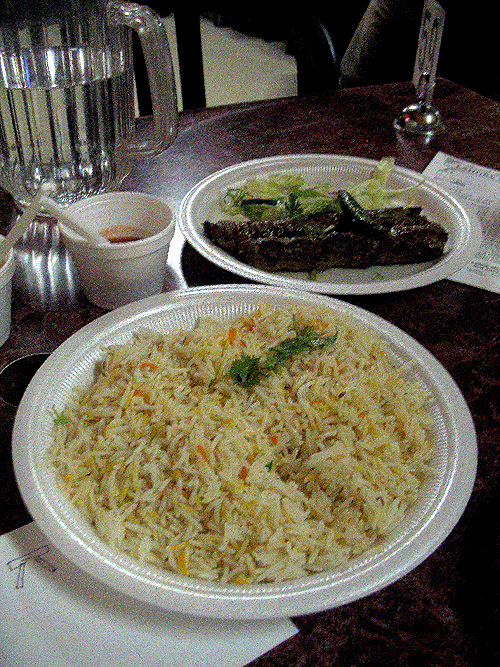
Plain Rice and Lahori Lamb Kabab

Some of the trendiest restaurants in Lahore are concentrated on the M M Alam Road in Gulberg. Here, dozens of high-class culinary outlets, ranging from Western franchises to traditional, ethnic, or theme restaurants, attract all classes of Lahore's citizens. New restaurants are constantly opening, and the business is extremely competitive. Many boisterous restaurants of Lahore are open late into the night. Some branches of Pizza Hut and Simply Sufi XPRS, McDonald's are open 24/7; McDonald's and KFC also offer a home delivery service.

Lahore also boasts a unique restaurant housed in a 300-year-old Kothi-style dwelling of a famous artist which was once a brothel. At different times in the life of this property, Hindu, Buddhist, Christian, and Muslim families have owned it. Another famous Lahore landmark is the Pak Tea House in Anarkali, long a favoured haunt of intellectuals and artists.

There are popular shisha bars (offering the flavoured tobacco pipes commonly found in Middle Eastern nations), attractive food outlets, and musical concerts and shows. Alcohol is available to foreigners who request it at certain hotels, but is generally not sold in public.

== Festivals ==
The people of Lahore celebrate many festivals and events throughout the year, blending Mughal, Western, and other traditions. Eid ul-Fitr and Eid ul-Adha are celebrated. Many people decorate their houses and light candles to illuminate the streets and houses during public holidays; roads and businesses may be lit for days. The mausoleum of Ali Hujwiri, also known as Data Ganj Bakhsh (Persian/Urdu: داتا گنج بخش) or Data Sahib, is located in Lahore, and an annual urs is held every year as a big festival. Basant is a Punjabi festival marking the coming of spring. Basant celebrations in Pakistan are centred in Lahore, and people from all over the country and from abroad come to the city for the annual festivities. Kite-flying competitions traditionally take place on city rooftops during Basant. Courts have banned the kite-flying because of casualties and power installation losses. The ban was lifted for two days in 2007, then immediately reimposed when 11 people were killed by celebratory gunfire, sharp kite-strings, electrocution, and falls related to the competition.

The Festival of Lamps, or Mela Chiraghan, is an important and popular event in Lahore. This is celebrated at the same time as Basant, every spring on the last Friday of March, outside the Shalimar Gardens.

The National Horse and Cattle Show is one of the most famous annual festivals, held in spring in the Fortress Stadium. The week-long activities include a livestock display, horse and camel dances, tent pegging, colourful folk dances from all regions of Pakistan, mass-band displays, and tattoo shows in the evenings. On 14 August, the people of Pakistan celebrate the day Pakistan gained its independence from the British Raj. There are many celebrations in Lahore; the streets are full of people singing and dancing. Parades of the Pakistan Army and Pakistan Air Force are held early in the morning.

== Shopping ==
The alleys and lanes of the bazaars located in the old city of Lahore are full of traditional wares like leather articles, embroidered garments, glass bangles, beaten gold and silver jewellery, and creations in silk. Anarkali is named after the famous courtesan of Akbar's time, Anarkali (Pomegranate Blossom). The grave of Sultan Qutbuddin Aibak, who died falling off his horse while playing polo, is also located in Anarkali on Aibak Road. Rang Mahal is part of old Lahore and today's houses a largest wholesale and retail cloth markets in Punjab.

Lahore's technology markets include the Hall Road, Pakistan's second largest electronics market adjacent to the Mall Road, and the Hafeez Centre, Asia's second largest computer market after Karachi, located on the Gulberg Main Boulevard. One of Lahore's important techno-markets, Shah Alam Market or Shalmi as locals call it, is located near the site of the Shah Alam Gate of Lahore.

Foreign clothes brands and Pakistani fashion labels are present in shopping districts of the city. Pace, a popular shopping centre, is also located on the Main Boulevard Gulberg beside the Hafeez Centre. The most well-known and popular shopping areas are the Liberty Market in Gulberg, in H-Block and Y-Block markets in Defence Housing Authority and at the Fortress Stadium, as well as malls in Gulberg, Model Town, MM Alam Road, and Lahore Cantonment. MM Alam Road is widely known for its designer stores and many cafes. Apart from these, numerous shopping areas have been developed in many of Lahore's new suburbs such as Bahria Town, Lake City, and Thokar Niaz Baig. Huge shopping malls and centres like Metro, Makro and Hyperstar (Carrefour) have situated their headquarters in Lahore. Lahore also offers a variety of nighttime shopping activities and several shopping areas remain open late into the night.

== Fashion ==
Lahore is recognised as one of the nation's most important fashion capitals, along with Karachi. Most of the fashion industry of Pakistan is based in Lahore. It has been home to fashion artists and designers such as Hassan Sheheryar Yasin and Karma. Several models of Pakistan also belong to Lahore, including Amna Haq, Iman Ali, Imran Abbas, Meesha Shafi and Rabia Butt.

Numerous fashion weeks have been held in Lahore. Fashion models from Lahore are not only restricted within the national boundaries but appear on international events. Lahore is also home to fashion institutions such as Pakistan Institute of Fashion and Design and the Lahore School of Fashion Design.
