= Spice Bazaar (restaurant) =

Pakistani cuisine restaurant in Lahore

- Interactive map of Spice Bazaar

Restaurant information
- Established: 2015
- Food type: Desi cuisine, Continental cuisine
- Location: 1-T Gulberg, off M. M. Alam Road (original restaurant), Lahore, Pakistan
- Coordinates: 31.5188°N 74.3550°E
- Website: spicebazaar.pk

The Spice Bazaar (Urdu: سپائس بازار) restaurants comprise multiple Desi and Continental cuisine restaurants in Lahore, Punjab, Pakistan.

The original restaurant was established in 2015 by Yum Group, the owner of Yum Chinese and Thai Restaurant and English Tea House in Lahore. According to The News International, the concept behind the business was to serve Pakistani cuisine "in an upscale environment" in Lahore's central commercial district at a time when such restaurants were mostly found in the historic Walled City. Spice Bazaar opened during a period when the Pakistan Food Authority was cracking down on Lahore restaurants that did not meet food safety standards. Restaurant attendance dropped, as the number and diversity of restaurants affected caused a perception among Lahorites that restaurants were unsafe. In this context, the PFA's formal approval of Spice Bazaar's food safety standards was credited by The News International as a "big boon for the restaurant".

It occupies a converted residential building at 1-T Gulberg, adjacent to M. M. Alam Road. The restaurant's layout comprises a sectioned hall and a central courtyard with a water fountain, and includes a dedicated kahwah space. Contained within the restaurant is a small shop called Chasni, which sells sweets such as laddoos and barfis. As of 2021, it offered a hi-tea buffet service in two time slots during the late afternoon, serving Desi and European-style dishes. The second restaurant is in the Defence Housing Authority (DHA) zone, at 58 MB, Main Boulevard. The third is also within DHA, in Lahore's Dolmen Mall.

== Reception ==
The original location received several positive reviews upon opening. In The News International, the restaurant's ambience and several dishes were praised, including the Murgh musallam and mutton ribs, with the desserts—ras malai and gulab jamun—singled out as the highlight of the meal for their presentation and balance of flavors. Conversely, some dishes were cited as disappointing: the Malai Boti, a dish of spiced, grilled chicken, and the curry chicken Handi were respectively viewed as bland and overly simple. Overall, the reviewer opined that with some "tweaks" to the menu, the restaurant would secure strong patronage.

In The Express Tribune, the restaurant's service, presentation and atmosphere were given high praise. The food was received less enthusiastically, receiving a numerical rating of 3/5, as the reviewer complained that several dishes lacked flavour, making them unappealing to the desi palate. Other dishes were complimented: the palak paneer was described as "outstanding" and the tawa chicken's spice as "anything but ordinary". Like News International, The Express Tribune's review also gave the gulab jamun as a highlight. A reviewer for Dawn gave Spice Bazaar a rating of 6.2 out of 9, which they said was "good for a new place" and merited a recommendation. In making their assessment, the review looked at how the restaurant handled simple dishes; for this, the maash ke daal was said to be particularly good. Each dish received praise, although the chicken ‘karahi’ was critiqued as too salty, which the reviewer suggested may suit the palate of neighbouring Kashmir. In a breakdown of the restaurant's qualities, the "steep" price was deemed the worst element, and the food presentation and quality the best. The location's valet parking was appreciated.

A 2017 assessment by Marian Sharaf Joseph of The Nation said the restaurant offered "true Lahori food" but was "unreasonably expensive". In 2019, the reviewer for Dawn returned to re-review Spice Bazaar. On this visit, the rating was revised to a 6.8 out of 9, with the restaurant being "highly recommended for a quality family meal." Of note were the cleanliness (the reviewer had requested and received a tour of the kitchen and storerooms) and the food's tastiness, receiving an 8 out of 9 score. The prices were again described as steep, and equally poor was considered the parking: no valet service was provided, and for 375 seatings, "not more than ten" spaces for parking were offered, necessitating street parking and irritiating the neighbours.
