= Pakistan Chowk =

Street intersection or "Chowrangi" in Saddar Town, Karachi, Pakistan

Pakistan Chowk is a chowk and cultural heritage site in Saddar Town, Karachi.

== History ==
It was established as an educational center by Dayaram Gidumai Shahani.

In the 1880s, Gidumai purchased the area and developed it as an educational hub. The Sindh College Association operated from this location, and Gidumai founded D. J. Sindh Government Science College, serving as its principal. After his death, his son Kewalram Shahani converted the area into a public square.

Pakistan Chowk hosted the Purana Tonga stand, a taxi and Victoria station, as well as well-known cafes such as Café Saadi and Kaisar Restaurant. The nearby Bholu Akhada fostered wrestlers such as Bholu Pehelvan and Aslam Pehlevan.

The Shahani family, Hindu-Sindhi educationists and writers, promoted Pakistan Chowk as a center for the printing press. Gidumai translated sacred texts, while Kewalram became a philosopher, writing a Sufi treatise and the first feminist novel in the Sindhi language. The family established art schools, libraries, and translation centers in the area.

Notable buildings included the Sarnagati Building, which housed a library and artist atelier, and a headquarters for the Sindh Sudhar Society. Pakistan Chowk was also home to the hostel culture of NED University of Engineering & Technology, providing accommodations for students and alumni. Hostels such as Sevakunj, Mihtaram, and Jinnah Courts, along with reading rooms, were instrumental in the area's educational history.

In 2017, Pakistan Chowk Community Centre was opened at Pakistan Chowk.
