= Kalma Underpass =

Coordinates: 31.504382°N 74.331527°E

Kalma Underpass کلمہ زیرگذر
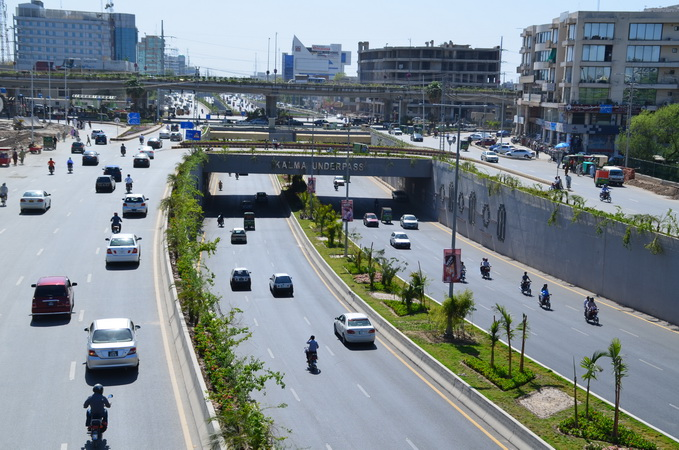
- Kalma Chowk Underpass, Lahore
- Interactive map of Kalma Underpass کلمہ زیرگذر

Location
- Lahore, Punjab, Pakistan
- Roads at junction: Ferozepur Road, Gulberg Boulevard, Garden Boulevard

Construction
- Type: Underpass
- Lanes: 4 × 3
- Constructed: by Habib Construction Services and IKAN JV
- Opened: 3 March 2013

Kalma Underpass (Urdu: کلمہ زیرگذر) is an underpass where east-west Main Boulevard Garden Town and Main Boulevard Gulberg join under north-south Ferozepur Road, connecting two southern suburbs of Lahore, Pakistan.

== Project brief ==
The Kalma Chowk intersection is one of the busiest in Lahore, Pakistan, with traffic volume often reaching as many as 393,000 vehicles per day. Two major roads—Ferozepur Road and the joining of Main Boulevard Garden Town (a.k.a. Barket Market Road) and Main Boulevard Gulberg (a.k.a. Liberty Market Road)—meet at this junction. Long lines were common during peak traffic times, and a vehicle would have to wait for up to eight minutes.

The recent inception of Metrobus, a popular mode of transportation in Lahore, made further improvements necessary at the Kalma Chowk junction. The Punjab Government considered these public difficulties and decided to construct an underpass from Gulberg to Garden Town, including four signal-free U-turn lanes, to improve traffic flow. An estimated 150,000 vehicles would benefit each day from the construction of the underpass and signal-free U-turns. The project was initiated on 11 December 2012, with a mobilization period of ten days. The actual date of commencement was 21 December 2012. In spite of inclement weather and several landslides due to rainfall, the project was completed in eighty days. Currently, it is the longest underpass in Pakistan, with a full height of 5.1 meters (17 feet) and a structural integrity capable of supporting light and heavy vehicles alike.

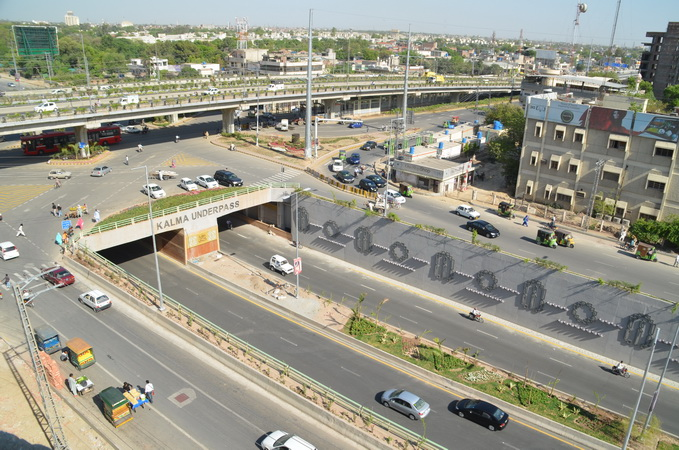
An aerial view of Kalma Underpass, Lahore.

== Project overview ==
Before undertaking the development of the underpass, a model study of the traffic diversion plan was conducted to facilitate planning to meet every requirement of the project. Project planning called for the construction of an underpass with two bores, one for each direction of traffic or carriageway, with ramps of varying length. Two single span bridges were also to be constructed, one on each side of the main overpass. These bridges would allow traffic to take signal-free U-turns. During construction, a large number of traffic control signs and traffic police were placed at the intersection to guide drivers.

== Scope of work ==
The project involved construction of two bores of varying width along the Barket Market–Liberty Market Road. The underpass has on/off ramps of varying length, with retaining walls of varying height. The underpass structure is over piles, and piles have also been used as a retaining structure. The two bores are separated by retaining walls in the underpass in such a way that four retaining walls frame each bore. The carriageways on the Liberty side are separated by a green belt, while the carriageways on the Barket Market side are separated by a retaining wall. The lengths of the on/off-ramps on the Barket Market side vary. In addition, four single span bridges have been connected to ramps to facilitate making U-turns. On the Barket Market side, with three of the four bridges, double U-turns are facilitated. The bridges are on spread footing with precast prestressed concrete girders. Service roads and slip roads have been provided at grade. A sump pump was installed on the Liberty-side ramp to prevent rain water from flooding the area of the underpass. Drains were made for its disposal.

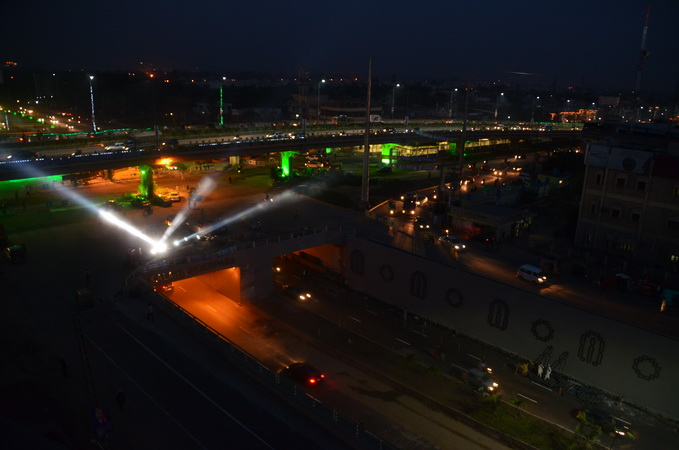
Kalma Underpass, Lahore at night

== Construction details ==
Type	Description
Name	Kalma Underpass, Lahore
Executing agency	LDA – TEPA
Consultant	NESPAK – ECSP JV
Contractor	Habib Construction Services – IKAN JV
Total length of project	3.0 km
underpass length with ramps	1070 meters
Barrel length	95 meters (main) 30 + 45 meters (U-turns)
Height of underpass	5.1 meters
Number of lanes	4 + 3 (mathematically known as 7)
Barrel width	15.3 meters and 12 meters (each)
Green planter	3' wide on either side of ramp
Central green planter	5.2 meters
Commencement date	11 December 2012
Completion date	3 March 2013
Time for completion	82 days
Project cost	Rs. 1746 million
Vehicles benefited per day	150,000

== See also ==
- Kalma Chowk Flyover
