= Fortress Stadium =

Fortress Stadium may refer to:

- Fortress Stadium (Lahore), shortened as simply Fortress – stadium in Lahore, Pakistan
- Hayes Lane, known as the Fortress Stadium for sponsorship purposes – stadium in Bromley, England, United Kingdom
- Smederevo Stadium, known as Fortress – stadium in Smederevo, Serbia
