= Choker (disambiguation) =

A choker is a close-fitting necklace, worn high on the neck.

Choker or Chokers may also refer to:

- Choker (film), a 2005 American film written and directed by Nick Vallelonga
- Choker Campbell (1916–1993), American musician
- "Choker" (song), a song by Twenty One Pilots from Scaled and Icy, 2021
- Choker, a cable end used in logging (see choke setter)
- An engineering measure for traffic calming
- Lengths of cable used in the transport of harvested trees, after cable logging
- Choke artist, or choker, individuals/teams that cannot cope with pressure in important situations
- Choker (musician), an R&B artist otherwise known as Chris Lloyd
- Choker (video game), a chess variant combining the rules of chess and poker

== See also ==
- Choke (disambiguation)
