= Choke =

Choke may refer to:

== Arts and entertainment ==
=== Music ===
- Choke (band), a Canadian band
- Choke (album), a 1990 album by the Beautiful South
- Choke (Kiss It Goodbye EP), 1999
- Choke (Poppy EP), 2019
- "Choke" (I Dont Know How but They Found Me song), 2017
- "Choke" (Sepultura song), 1998
- "Choke", a 1996 song from the album First Band on the Moon by the Cardigans
- "Choke", a 1997 song from the album Double Plaidinum by Lagwagon
- "Choke", a 2001 song from the album Echo Park by Feeder
- "Choke", a 2006 song from the album I Choose Noise by Hybrid
- "Choke", a 2007 song from the album Aneurythm by Living Syndication
- "Choke", a 2009 song from the album Sorry for Partyin' by Bowling for Soup
- "Choke", a 2013 song from the album The Devil Put Dinosaurs Here by Alice in Chains
- "Choke", a 2016 song from the album Oh My My by OneRepublic
- "Choke", a 2021 song by the Warning
- "Choke", a 2022 song from the album True Power by I Prevail

=== Film and television ===
- Choke (2008 film), a film based on the novel by Chuck Palahniuk
- Choke (2011 film), a Canadian animated short film
- Choke, a 1999 documentary about Rickson Gracie's preparation for the 1995 Vale Tudo Fighting Championship
- Choke, a 2001 psychological thriller directed by John M. Sjogren
- Choked (film), a 2020 Indian drama film
- "Choke" (Glee), an episode of Glee
- Choke., 2004 Canadian film

=== Books ===
- The Choke (Laguna novel)
- Choke (novel), a 2001 novel by Chuck Palahniuk
- Choke, a 1995 novel by Stuart Woods

== Other uses ==
- Choke (electronics), an inductor used to block signals of particular frequencies
  - An inductor of any type, sometimes referred to as a choke
- Choke (firearms), a tapered constriction of a shotgun barrel's bore at the muzzle end
- Choke (horse), a condition in horses in which the esophagus is blocked
- Choke (sports), a failure to win games at a crucial moment
- Choking, obstruction of airflow into the lungs
- Chokehold, a grappling hold on the neck
- Choked flow, a restriction of fluid flow under pressure, in which the fluid reaches sonic flow
- Choke point, a constriction in a conduit or transport system, e.g. a narrowing of a road
- Choke valve, a valve used to constrict air and increase fuel into a carburetor in order to start an internal combustion engines
- Chokecherry, a suckering shrub or small tree, a species of bird cherry
- Choke Yasuoka (born 1973), wheelchair racer

== See also ==
- Chowk (disambiguation) (pronounced "choke"), in Hindi-Urdu, is a place where paths intersect
- Artichoke (or 'chokes), vegetable using the flower head
- Sunchoke, vegetable using the tuber
