= Kalma Chowk (disambiguation) =

Kalma Chowk may refer to:

- Kalma Chowk, a square, road intersection in Lahore, Pakistan
- Kalma Chowk Flyover, a road flyover, overpass in Lahore, Pakistan
