= Lakshmi Mansion =

General information
- Status: Partially demolished
- Type: Residential
- Location: Lahore District, Punjab, Pakistan
- Owner: Khidmat Group

Lakshmi Mansion is a historical building located near Mall Road, Lahore, Punjab, Pakistan. It was once home to writer Saadat Hasan Manto.

This mansion was originally the personal residence of Sir Shadi Lal. It has been the residence of many notable personalities including former Caretaker Prime Minister Malik Meraj Khalid and famous intellectual Ayesha Jalal's father also lived here. The building is located between Bedon Road and Hall Road, Lahore. According to a petition, it has been partially demolished.

== Current status ==
The flats of Lakshmi Mansions have been bought by the Khidmat Group, which plans to use the building for commercial purposes.

== Controversies ==
There have been concerns about the demolition of the mansion. A petitioner pleaded with the Lahore High Court to restrain the government from demolishing the rest of Lakshmi Mansion. The city government's counsel argued that the demolished building was not a part of Lakshmi Mansion but a privately owned house.
