= Sevakunj Hostel =

Historical building in Karachi

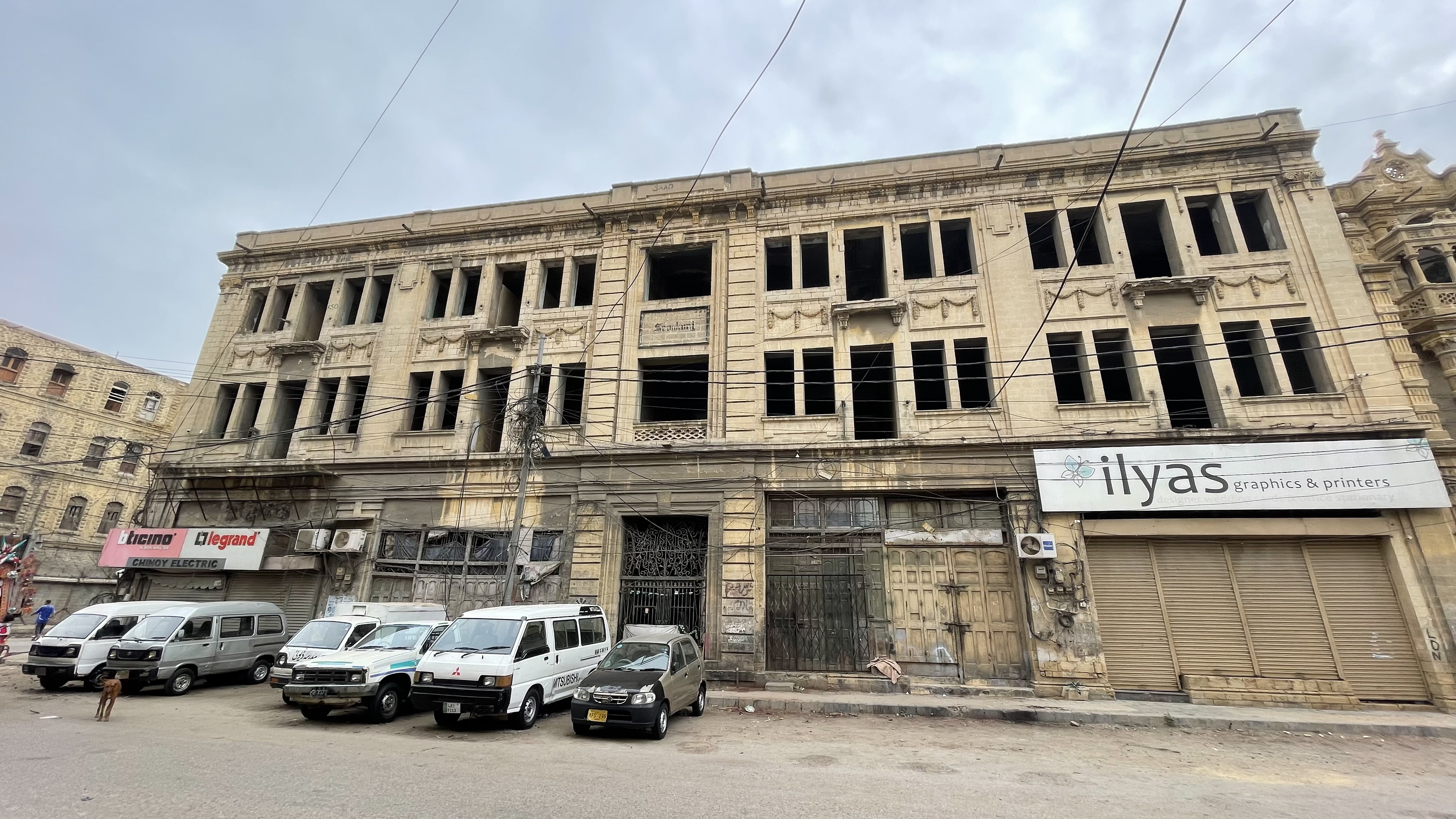
- View of the building from Aram Bagh Road
- Interactive map of the Sevakunj Hostel area

General information
- Location: Aram Bagh Road, Rambagh Quarter, Karachi, Pakistan
- Coordinates: 24°51′18″N 67°0′43″E
- Current tenants: unknown
- Inaugurated: 1910s
- Owner: Dewan trust

Design and construction
- Architect: unknown

The Sevakunj Hostel, a historic landmark in Aram Bagh Road, Rambagh Quarter, Karachi. The building was erected in the 1910s by an affluent Hindu family.

The building of the Sevakunj Hostel, resembling a flawless square, is arranged around a courtyard. Rooms in the two-story structure are positioned around this central space. The building boasts symmetrical adornments on all four sides, with each side divided into two-halves featuring central window openings. Every room includes a balcony bordered by wrought iron grilles, upheld by stone brackets. The building boasts minimal yet refined exteriors adorned with a series of long windows. Its layout is distinctive, featuring a central courtyard instead of an open compound. This courtyard served as a communal area within the hostel and hosted university events.

== History ==
=== British Raj ===
The name "Sevakunj" originates from the Sanskrit words Seva and Kunj, meaning "Service Grove". The builders of the hostel were the Shahani family, a prominent Sindhi-Hindu family active in education. The hostel accommodated not only local students but also a significant number of international students.

=== Post-independence ===
In the 1980s, due to violent clashes between student groups, Sevakunj Hostel and several neighbouring student accommodations had to close their doors. Sevakunj Hostel had been serving as a residence for students, especially those enrolled at NED College/University and later Dawood Engineering College, until the early 1990s.

Despite its central location near Pakistan Chowk, once revered as the educational heart of the city and home to numerous historic structures, the building now stands abandoned. In 1997, it was designated as a protected site under the Sindh Cultural Heritage Preservation Act of 1994.

== See also ==
- Jinnah Courts, another former hostel
- Mitha Ram Hostel
