= Joyland (company) =

Pakistani amusement park

Joyland (Urdu: جوائے لینڈ) is a Pakistani amusement park company based in Lahore, Punjab, Pakistan.

== Lahore Park ==
As the oldest amusement park company in Pakistan, Joyland its operation with their first park, also named Joyland, in Lahore back in 1977. In the interest of limiting sexual harassment and keeping park family friendly, Joyland limited the entry of adult men unaccompanied by women or family.

The park is located in Fortress Stadium, a cantonment area managed by the Pakistan Army home to many other entertainment locations. In 2012, an investor began litigation with the army regarding investment on the park.

Joyland is considered a modern cultural entertainment landmark of Lahore, sparking essays on nostalgia and short stories. Most significantly, the 2022 film Joyland, Pakistan's 2023 entry for the Oscars, takes its title from the park, featuring it extensively in the film.
