= Jinnah Courts =

British colonial-era building in Karachi

- جناح کورٹس
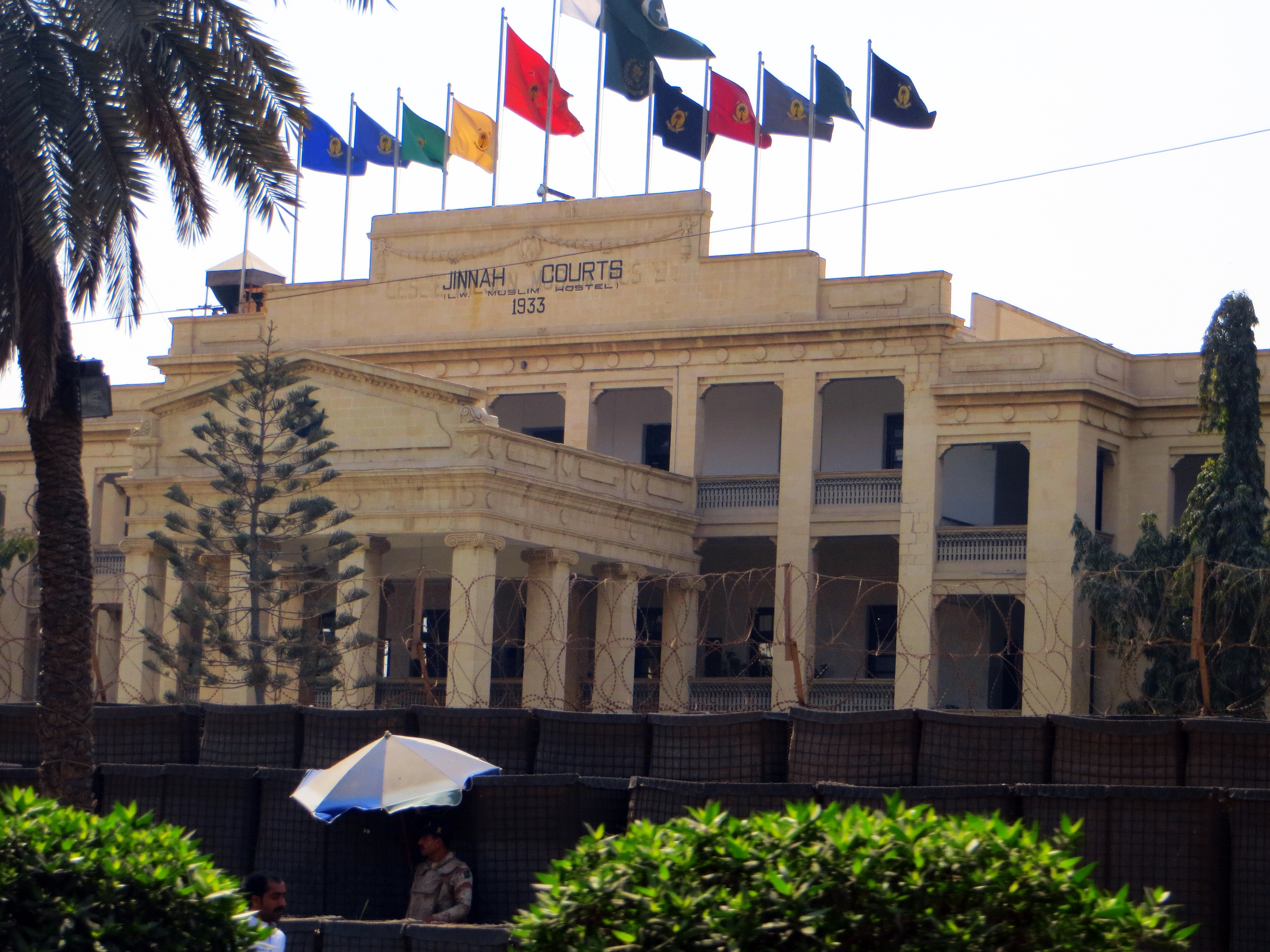
- Front view at Dr Ziauddin Ahmed Road
- Interactive map of the Jinnah Courts area

General information
- Type: Hostel
- Location: Dr Zia-ud-Din Ahmed Rd, Saddar Town, Civil Lines, Karachi
- Coordinates: 24.84805°N 67.02147°E
- Construction started: June 1932
- Completed: June 1933

Design and construction
- Architect: James Strachan
- Developer: Khan Bahadur Allah Bux Soomro

Jinnah Courts, formerly known as Leslie Wilson Muslim Hostel, is a heritage building located on Dr Ziauddin Ahmed Road in Karachi's Civil Lines. Initially serving as a hostel for students from Sindh, the Pakistan Rangers temporarily moved in during 1999 and have remained there since.

== History ==
Founded as the Leslie Wilson Muslim Hostel, named after Leslie Wilson, it was built using donations from citizens and provincial local bodies to accommodate students from across Sindh. The foundation stone was laid in June 1932, and the building was inaugurated in June 1933.

The hostel housed students from afar, attending nearby educational institutions like NED Engineering College, DJ Science Colleges, Sindh Muslim Law College, and Sindh Madarsatul Islam, all within walking distance. It offered housekeeping services and attracted alumni who continued to reside there even after graduation, while also providing reading rooms.

In 1986, management of the building was handed over to the culture department, and the Rangers temporarily relocated their headquarters there in April 1999. Previously, the Rangers headquarters was located in the Sheikh Zayed Islamic Centre (SZIC) on University Road. However, the United Arab Emirates government, which funded the SZIC's construction, objected to its use by law enforcement and insisted that it be reserved for educational purposes.

The status of the building is protected by the Sindh Cultural Heritage (Preservation) Act of 1994.

The Jinnah Courts is used since 1999 as the headquarters of the Sindh Rangers, paramilitary federal law enforcement organization.

== See also ==
- Mitha Ram Hostel, another former hostel under the administration of Sindh Rangers
- Sevakunj Hostel
