= Chowk Yadgar =

- چوک یادگار
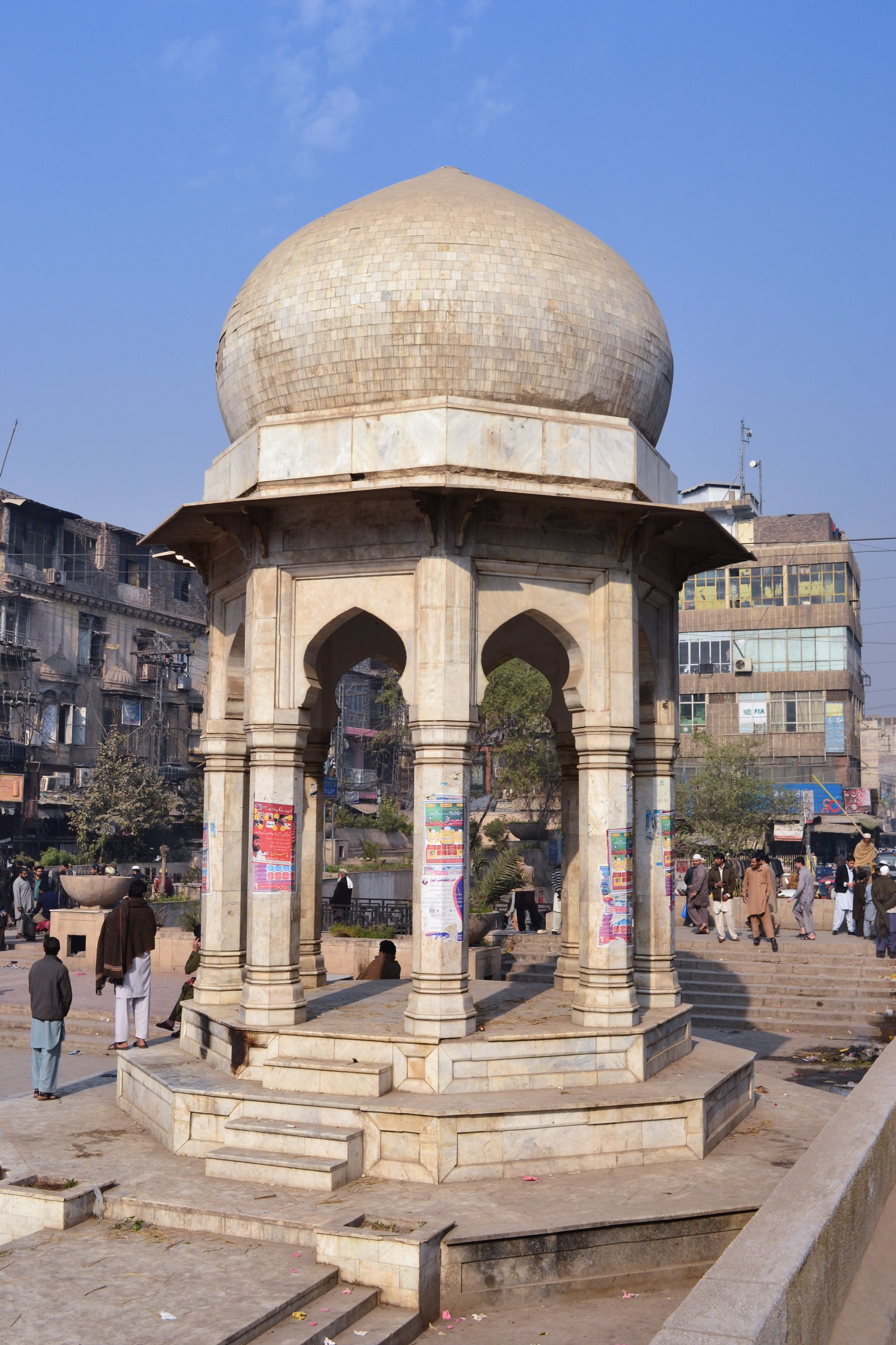
- The monument is located in Peshawar's Old City, and is dedicated to the victims of the 1930 Qissa Khwani Bazaar massacre.

General information
- Type: Public monument
- Location: Peshawar, Pakistan

Chowk Yadgar (Urdu: چوک یادگار; lit. 'Memorial Square'), formerly Hasting's Memorial, is a landmark in the old walled city of Peshawar. It is located at the convergence point of different major roads and bazaars of the old city.

It is well known as the center of hawala business in Peshawar.

== History ==
The first "Dome Shaped" monument at this square was originally erected in the memory of Colonel C. Hastings in 1883.

== Location ==
To the West of Chowk Yadgar is the end of “Ander Shehr Street” (meaning “inside of the city”) or “Jewelers street”. The Jewelers Street starts from the “Naz Cinema Road” (right in front of Forward High School) and culminates at Chowk Yadgar. Going eastwards from chowk yadgar is the famous Ghanta Ghar or clock tower in the city. On the south is located bazar -e - abresham garan or the shawls market. and on the north of is ashraf road peshawr a busy place for traders
