= Fortress Square =

Shopping mall in Lahore, Pakistan

- فورٹریس اسکوائر
- Location: Lahore Cantonment, Punjab, Pakistan
- Coordinates: 31°31′57″N 74°21′47″E
- Address: Mian Mir Bridge, Fortress Stadium Road, Lahore Cantt
- Opened: 2014
- Developer: Dupak Pakistan Developers
- Manager: Fortress Square Mall Management
- Owner: Dupak Properties
- Num. of stores: 100+
- Floor area: 60,942 square feet (5,662 m^{2})
- Floors: 5
- Parking: Multistorey car park
- Public transit: Lahore Cantonment railway station
- Website: fortresssquare.com

Fortress Square is a five-storey shopping mall and entertainment complex located in Lahore Cantonment, Punjab, west of Fortress Cricket Stadium. It was constructed in 2014 by DUPAK Pakistan Developers after demolition of 114 Brigade headquarters of Pakistan Army on the land owned by the government of Pakistan.

== History ==
Fortress Square was constructed on a 60,942 sq ft (5,661.7 m^{2}) plot inside the Fortress Stadium precinct, on land that had previously housed the 114 Brigade headquarters of the Pakistan Army, which was demolished to make way for the project. On 27 October 2007, the Fortress Stadium Management (FSM), operating under the Soldiers' Welfare Organisation Lahore, leased the site to DUPAK Pakistan Developers for a period of 33 years. Construction of the mall was completed in 2014.

In February 2014, a Lahore resident, Nayyer Khan, filed a writ petition in the Lahore High Court challenging the lease and the construction of the mall on government-owned land classified as Class A-I and reserved for military use. Through his counsel, Saad Rasool, Khan argued that although the lease named the Pakistan Army as the sole owner of the land, the property in fact belonged to the federal government, which had given it to the Ministry of Defence for occupation. The petition further contended that the FSM was neither a legal entity nor part of the government, that the cantonment board had not approved the project, and that the construction violated the Pakistan Environmental Protection Act, 1997. Justice Ayesha A. Malik issued notices to the federal and provincial governments and the Fortress Stadium Management.

In May 2014, the court warned the FSM and DUPAK Pakistan Developers that construction and commercial activity at the plaza would be stayed if replies to the petition were not filed within a week. A joint reply submitted on behalf of the Ministry of Defence, the Director General Military Lands, and the Cantonments and Military Estates Officer relied on policy directives issued by the defence ministry in 2008 and 2009, which they argued permitted the commercial use of A-1 land for shops to be constructed and rented out by the army. The petitioner's counsel responded that a policy could not override the law of the country. In subsequent proceedings, counsel for the FSM maintained that, as the FSM operated under the army, no petition against it was admissible.

The mall opened later in 2014, despite the ongoing litigation.

== Operations ==
Fortress Square has a total floor area of 60,942 sq ft (5,661.7 m^{2}) spread across five levels, and houses more than 100 local and international retail outlets. The complex includes a multi-screen Cinepax cinema equipped with Dolby Atmos sound, a food court offering local, regional, and international cuisines, and a children's entertainment zone. The site is served by a multistorey car park and is located adjacent to other commercial and leisure facilities within the Fortress Stadium precinct, including Hyperstar and Sozo World.
