= Dharna Chowk, Hyderabad =

Dharna Chowk is an area where protests and strikes against governments take place in Hyderabad, India. It is located opposite to Indira Park.

== History ==
Earlier, the place opposite to the Andhra Pradesh Secretariat was used for protests and strikes.
