= Chowrangi =

Urdu word meaning crossroads

Chowrangi (Urdu: چورنگی) or chowk (चौक/چوک) is an Urdu word meaning crossroads. It is where two major roads cross each other. This may be facilitated by a roundabout or an overpass/underpass.

In Pakistan, this term is frequently used in Karachi. In other parts of country, like Punjab province, other terms are used. "Chowk" (also an Urdu word) is another word used in other cities of Pakistan like Multan, Lahore and rest of Pakistani Punjab province. Chowk also means a variety of things, for example a town square, an intersection, a roundabout, or a crossing.

== See also ==
- Chowk (disambiguation)
