= Mitha Ram Hostel =

Historical building in Karachi

Mitharam Hostel
- Interactive map of the Mitharam Hostel area

General information
- Architectural style: neoclassical
- Location: Dr. Ziauddin Ahmed (Kutchary) Road in Serai Quarter, Karachi, Pakistan
- Coordinates: 24°51′9″N 67°0′48″E
- Current tenants: Paramilitary Pakistan Rangers (since 1992)
- Construction started: Between 1894 and 1901
- Owner: Government of Sindh

Technical details
- Floor area: 3,639.66 m^{2} (39,177.0 sq ft)

Design and construction
- Architect: James Strachan

Mitha Ram Hostel, also spelled as Mitharam Hostel, is a historical building and former hostel in Karachi. It now serves as a sub-jail under the administration of Sindh Rangers since April 2015.

== History ==
Mitha Ram Hostel shares a historical connection with D. J. Sindh Government Science College, which was established through the efforts of Indian lawyer, Dayaram Gidumal, in the late 1880s. Gidumal campaigned for the college's construction, as many Karachi students could not afford to travel to Bombay for education. Funded by both the Bombay and Karachi governments and private contributions, the college was completed in 1887 and named after Diaram Jethmal, whose family made a significant donation.

The subsequent influx of students to Karachi necessitated the construction of a hostel. Gidumal's brother, Mitha Ram, contributed financially to the project, leading to the hostel's completion in 1901. Notably, the Mitha Ram Hostel played a role in the 1940s independence movement, hosting meetings for activists such as Sobho Gianchandani and Hashu Kevalramani.

In the 1990s, Syed Abdullah Shah, a former chief minister, intended to transform the building into a museum, but this plan never materialized.

In 1992, the hostel was occupied by the Pakistan Rangers and later received the approval by the Chief Minister of Sindh, legitimizing a practice that had occurred without formal agreement for decades. Initially, the Rangers were stationed at the hostel to maintain order and address escalating incidents of targeted killings and kidnappings in Karachi.

== See also ==
- Jinnah Courts, another former hostel under the administration of Sindh Rangers
- Sevakunj Hostel
