= Living Syndication =

American rock band

- Living Syndication circa 2009. From left to right: Andy DeCicco, Pervez Taufiq, Bernard "Senchant" Birgenheier, John Spinney

Background information
- Origin: Boston, Massachusetts
- Genres: Rock, alternative metal
- Years active: 2001–present
- Label: LS
- Members: Pervez Taufiq; Andy DeCicco; Bernard "Senchant" Birgenheier; John Spinney
- Past members: Joe D'Arco; Paul Wandtke; Gregg Irick; Robert Lauer; Mike Bodnar; Matt Kaminsky; Bryan Croad; Jimmy Magoon; Michael Desmond
- Website: http://www.livingsyndication.com/

Living Syndication is a rock band from Massachusetts started by Pervez Taufiq in 2001. They have been described as "tailored blends of Alice In Chains and Tool with enough modernization to attract a younger fan-base"

Initially a solo project, it then evolved to being a band which has released two albums which have had moderate success. Two songs in particular "Choke" and "13 Minutes" have been confused as being unreleased or bonus A Perfect Circle tracks from their Emotive CD, because the band had purposely designed their style to copy A Perfect Circle.

== History ==
=== Om Factor ===
Living Syndication Logo.

Pervez Taufiq started Living Syndication in 2001 as a basement project initially playing all the music for demo tracks on his own. Initially bringing on a singer to work with him, he found it easier to just sing the tracks himself. After putting together two demo tracks, Pervez Taufiq released to tracks via the then underground file sharing program, Napster. One of the tracks, "Restrain" had been burned by a DJ at the New York radio station KROCK and played on the air. Shortly after, Pervez received a phone call from A&R David Levy from Flawless Records fielding interest in the tracks and wanting to hear more. Thus began the building of the band, and the early tracks from a 2004 released EP titled "Om Factor". News was spreading about the band and even Universal Records artist Godsmack started coming by to watch the band play shows In 2003, Living Syndication took a demo that they had done of a song named "Choke" and submitted along with 1,800 other bands to AT&T for their contest for CALL ATT. After a month's time, the band was selected from amongst all the acts by Atlantic Records, as a winner of the contest. They proceeded to tour with Kill Hannah as a result, and were able to bolster their fan base as a result. They were receiving opening slots for many of the genre's notable National acts such as Sevendust, Shinedown, Crossfade, Lacuna Coil, Drowning Pool. In early 2003, The band began recording their first LP.

=== Aneurythm ===
After several member changes and delays in recording, Living Syndication released "Aneurythm" on September 27, 2007, an 18 track CD with 79 minutes and 59 seconds of music, the most that any band had ever released on a CD before that time.

Living Syndication Aneurythm CD.

Living Syndication's song "Hubris" was the theme song for NBC Show CORR (Championship Off Road Racing)

== Discography ==
=== Albums ===
Date of Release	Title	Label
2002	Om Factor EP (Self-Released)	None
2007	Aneurythm	(LS Records)

== Band members ==
- Pervez Taufiq - (vocals, guitar)
- John Spinney - (drums)
- Mike Desmond - (guitar)
- Andy DeCicco - (bass)

=== Former members ===
- Joe D'Arco (drums)
- Paul Wandtke (drums)
- Gregg Irick (drums)
- Robert Lauer (drums)
- Mike Bodnar (drums)
- Matt Kaminsky(bass)
- Michael Durwin (bass)
- Bryan Croad (guitar)
- Jimmy Magoon (guitar)
- Michael Desmond (guitar)
- Bernard "Senchant" Birgenheier (guitar)
