= Kalma Chowk =

Road intersection in Lahore, Pakistan

Kalma Chowk کلمہ چوک

Major junctions
- From: Garden Town, Lahore
- To: Gulberg, Lahore

Location
- Country: Pakistan

Highway system
- Roads in Pakistan

Kalma Chowk (Urdu, Punjabi: کلمہ چوک) is a town square and road intersection in Lahore, Punjab, Pakistan. It is one of the city's busiest intersections in terms of traffic. Kalma Chowk Flyover passes over it. It is the intersection of the main roads of Ferozepur Road, Main Boulevard Garden Town and Main Boulevard Gulberg. It is a combination of a two-way flyover and a two-way heavy-duty underpass connecting Garden Town and Gulberg. The flyover was opened for traffic in March 2023.
