= Fortress Stadium (Lahore) =

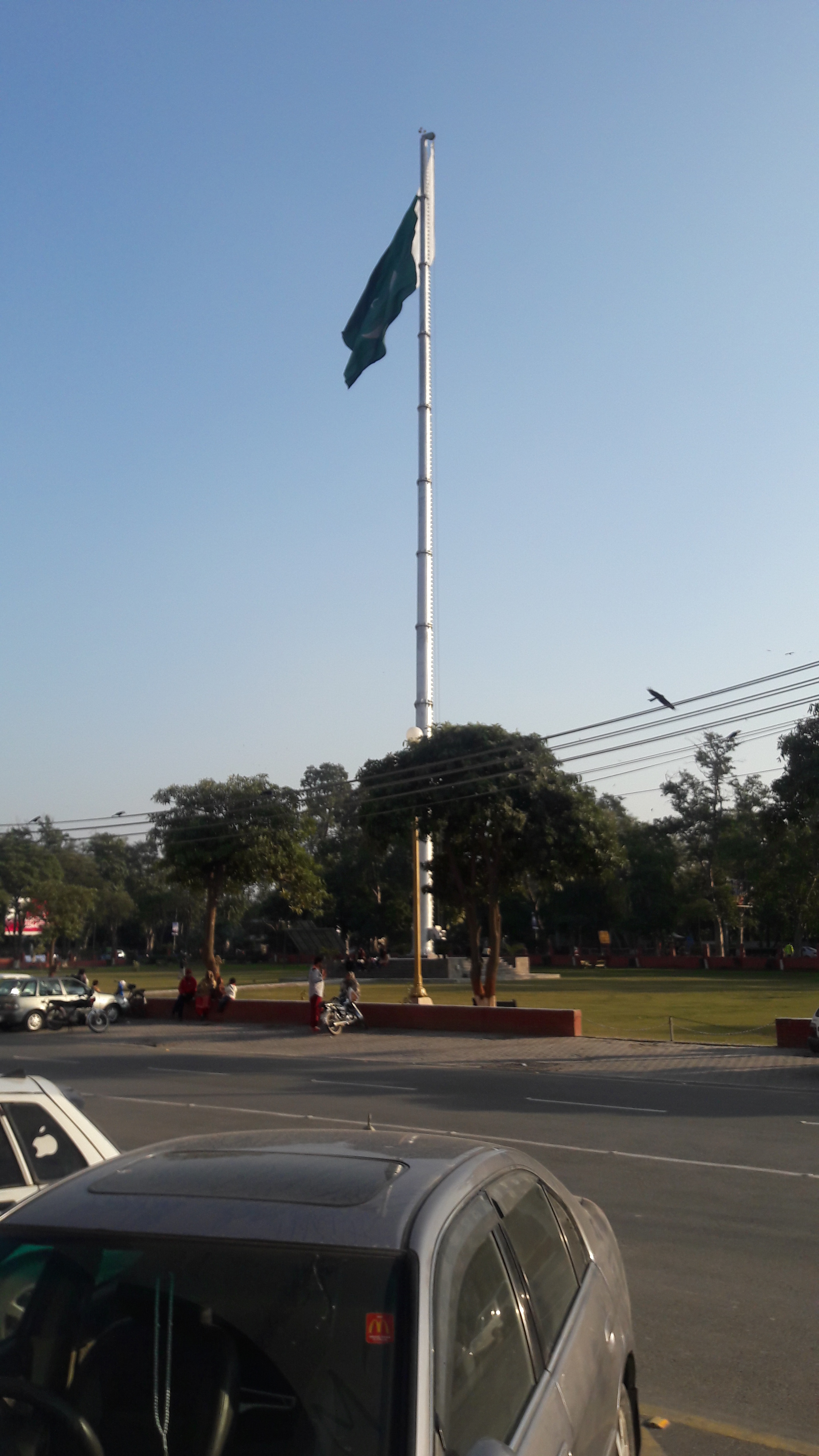
- Flag outside Fortress Stadium shopping area
- Interactive map of Fortress Stadium
- Address: Fortress Stadium Circular Road, Lahore Cantonment
- Location: Lahore Cantonment, Lahore, Punjab, Pakistan
- Coordinates: 31°30′33″N 74°21′29″E
- Owner: Pakistan Army
- Operator: Pakistan Army
- Type: Entertainment and shopping precinct; sports stadium
- Public transit: Lahore Cantonment railway station

Fortress Stadium (commonly shortened to Fortress) is a sports stadium and adjoining commercial and entertainment precinct located in Lahore Cantonment, Punjab, Pakistan. It is owned and administered by the Pakistan Army through the Fortress Stadium Management (FSM), an entity operating under the Soldiers' Welfare Organisation Lahore (SWOL).

== History ==
The site originated as an open military parade ground within the British-built Lahore Cantonment, laid out in the mid-19th century after the Second Anglo-Sikh War and the annexation of Punjab by the British colonial administration in 1849. Used during the colonial period for cavalry training, rifle ranges, and equestrian activities, the ground was retained for military use after independence in 1947 and came under the control of the Pakistan Army.

By the early 1960s, the ground was formally referred to as the Fortress Stadium, and in 1964 it became the venue of the inaugural National Horse and Cattle Show, organised under the direction of Azam Khan and the Punjab animal husbandry department. The show, featuring livestock displays, tent pegging, dressage, folk dances, mass-band displays, and fireworks, has since become one of Lahore's signature cultural events.

In 2014, the five-storey Fortress Square shopping mall was completed on land inside the precinct that had previously housed the 114 Brigade headquarters of the Pakistan Army.

In February 2014, a Lahore resident, Nayyer Khan, filed a writ petition in the Lahore High Court challenging a lease agreement under which the FSM had handed over a 60,942 sq ft (5,661.7 m^{2}) parcel inside the precinct to DUPAK Pakistan Developers for the construction of the Fortress Square shopping mall. Through his counsel, Saad Rasool, the petitioner argued that the land in question belonged to the federal government, which had given it to the Ministry of Defence only for occupation, and that the FSM, operating as part of the Soldiers' Welfare Organisation Lahore, was neither a legal entity nor a government department empowered to lease state land. The petition further contended that no commercial construction was permissible in the cantonment without approval from the cantonment board, that the project had received no such approval, and that the 114 Brigade headquarters had been demolished to clear the site. Justice Ayesha A. Malik issued notices to the federal and provincial governments and the FSM.

In May 2014, the court warned the FSM and DUPAK Pakistan Developers that all construction and commercial activity at the site would be stayed unless replies were filed within a week. A joint reply submitted on behalf of the Ministry of Defence, the Director General Military Lands, and the Cantonments and Military Estates Officer relied on policy directives issued by the defence ministry in 2008 and 2009, which the respondents argued permitted the commercial use of Class A-1 land for shops to be constructed and rented out by the army; the petitioner's counsel responded that a ministerial policy could not override the law. In subsequent proceedings, counsel for the FSM maintained that, as the FSM operated under the army, no petition against it was admissible. Fortress Square opened later in 2014, despite the litigation.

== Operations ==
The stadium and surrounding precinct are managed by the Fortress Stadium Management, whose chairperson is typically a serving brigadier of the Pakistan Army and whose secretary is a retired army officer. The FSM operates under the Soldiers' Welfare Organisation Lahore, the army's welfare body for soldiers' families. The complex extends over more than 30 acres (120,000 m^{2}) and incorporates the main sports ground, used for cricket and polo, alongside the National Horse and Cattle Show grounds, the Fortress Square mall, the Joyland amusement park, the Sindbad children's play area, the Pace Shopping Mall, a Hyperstar hypermarket, and various boutiques, restaurants, and cafés.

The stadium is also used as a venue for Defence Day. The National Horse and Cattle Show was revived at the stadium in 2025 after a multi-year hiatus.

== See also ==
- M. M. Alam Road
