= Hall Road, Lahore =

Commercial road in Lahore, Pakistan

Hall Road سڑک ہال
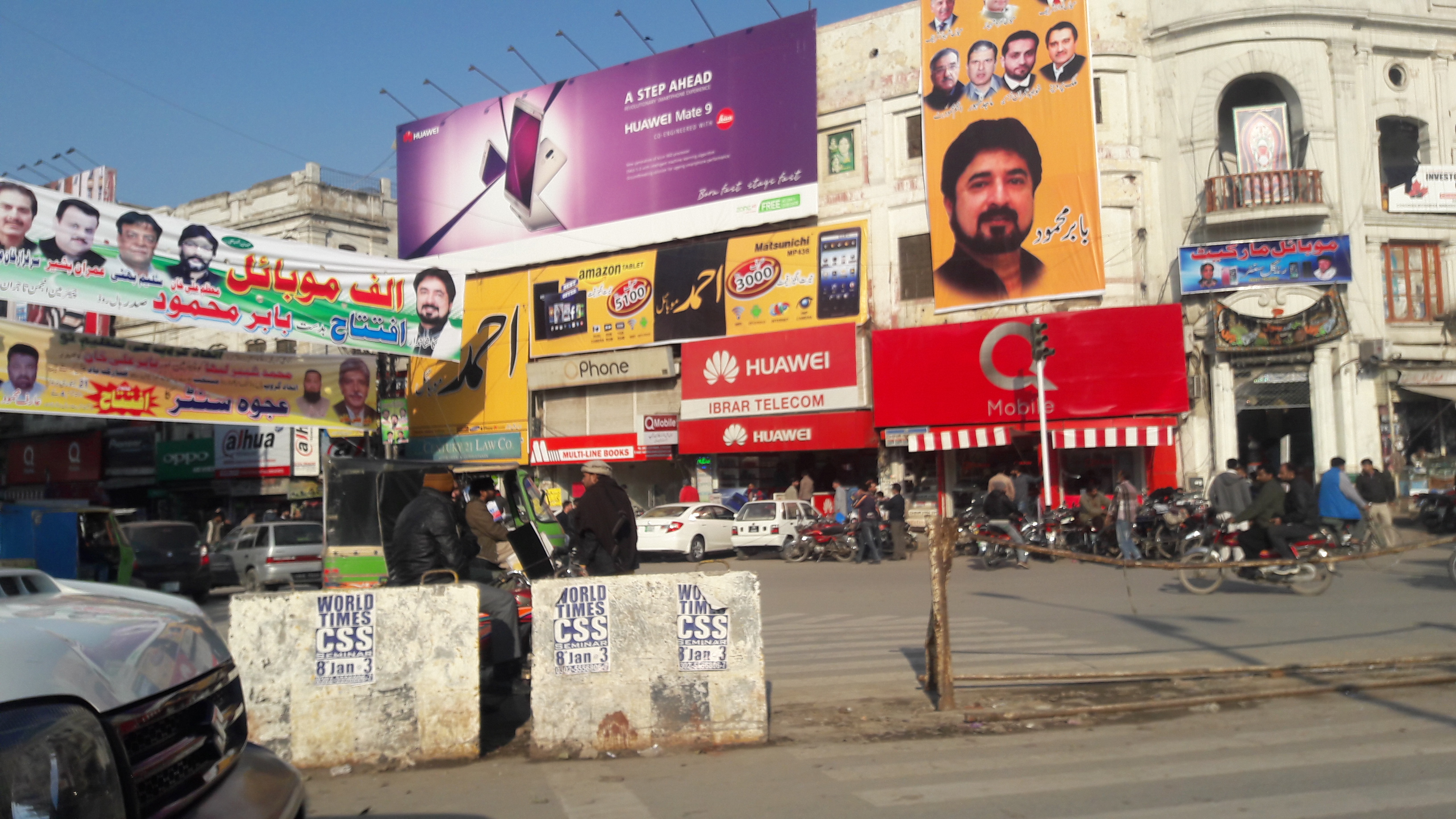

Route information
- Maintained by City District Government Lahore

Major junctions
- From: Regal Chowk, Mall Road
- To: McLeod Road

Location
- Country: Pakistan

Highway system
- Roads in Pakistan

Hall Road is a commercial road near the historic Mall Road in Lahore, Pakistan. Like the Mall Road, it is surrounded by buildings built by the British before Pakistan's independence in 1947. The name of the road comes from the fact that the British had built 4 huge halls along the road, which catered to meetings, exhibitions.

Today those halls have been converted into commercial buildings and is the hub of Lahore's digital electronics and home appliances such as TVs, audio and DVD players, computers/ Laptops, video games & mobile phones. Hall Road, Lahore is one of the largest markets of imported electronics including CCTV camera accessories, loud-speakers & magnets, wires & cables, power supply devices such as UPS, generators & solar energy equipment.

Hall Road also houses the Cathedral Church of the Resurrection, Lahore which was established in 1881 under The Management of Lahore Diocesan Board of Education.

Hall Road is declared as 'one way' by city traffic police and usually is expected to have heavy city traffic on it.

Fire broke out thrice on Hall Road, first in 2012, then in 2018 and last in 2021.
