= M. M. Alam Road =

Road in Lahore, Pakistan

M.M. Alam Road
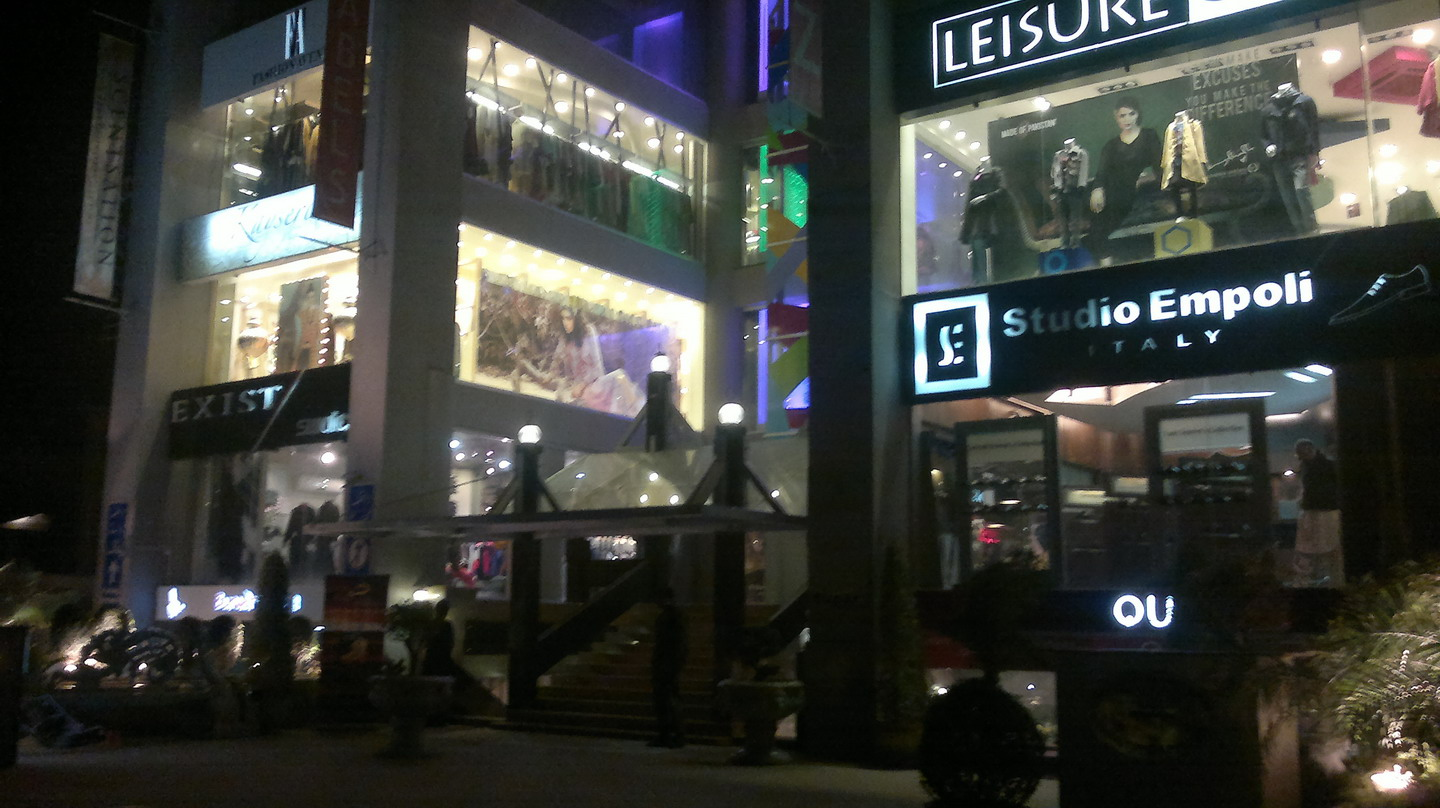
- Location: Lahore
- From: Main Market, Gulberg
- Major junctions: Hussain Chowk; Mini Market Roundabout
- To: Firdous Market, Gulberg

Muhammad Mahmood Alam Road (Urdu: سڑک محمد محمود عالم, Sarak-e-Muhammad Mahmood Alam), or more popularly known as M. M. Alam Road, is a major road in Lahore, Punjab, Pakistan named in honour of the Pakistan Air Force flying ace, Air Commodore Muhammad Mahmood Alam.

The road extends from Gulberg Main Market to Firdous Market in Gulberg, and runs parallel to Gulberg Boulevard thus providing an alternate route. The road hosts a variety of flamboyant restaurants, fashion boutiques, shopping malls, beauty saloons and décor stores.

A long delayed remodeling project for the road was launched in 2011 with a budget of Rs. 250 million (US$890,000).

== History ==
The road is named after flying ace of Pakistan Air Force, Air Commodore Muhammad Mahmood Alam who was the recipient of the Pakistani military decoration, the Sitara-e-Jurrat (The star of courage) and a bar to it for his dog fight during the Indo Pakistan War of 1965 when he downed five Indian aircraft in less than a minute, the first four within 30 seconds, establishing a world record. It used to be a residential area, which quickly became commercial with the opening up of many private schools and later fashion studios like Jafferjees and international and national restaurants such as KFC, Nandos and Pizza Hut. It has been renovated to cope with the heavy traffic and night life of the area.

Recently Tim Hortons has open their first branch near to MM Alam Road in Gulberg, Lahore.

== Rehabilitation ==
Widening and rehabilitation of the road project initiated by Punjab Government started in November, 2012 and was completed in March 2013.
