= Gulberg, Lahore =

Residential neighbourhood in Lahore, Punjab, Pakistan

Gulberg گلبرگ
- Neighbourhood
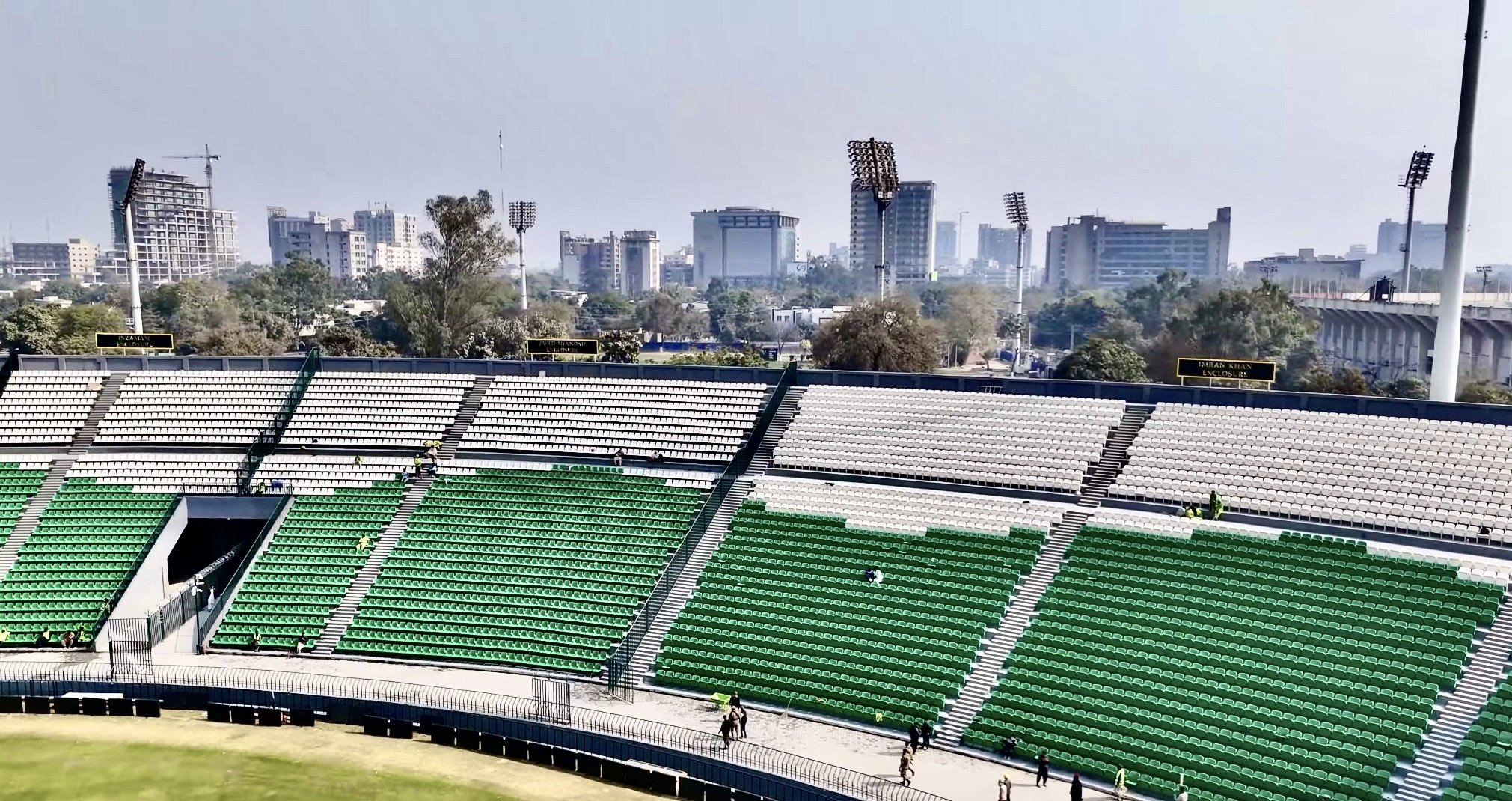
- Skyline of Gulberg in the background from Qaddafi Stadium.
- Interactive map of Gulberg گلبرگ
- Coordinates: 31.5105364°N 74.3407864°E
- Country: Pakistan
- Province: Punjab
- City: Lahore
- Tehsil: Model Town
- Union council No: 3

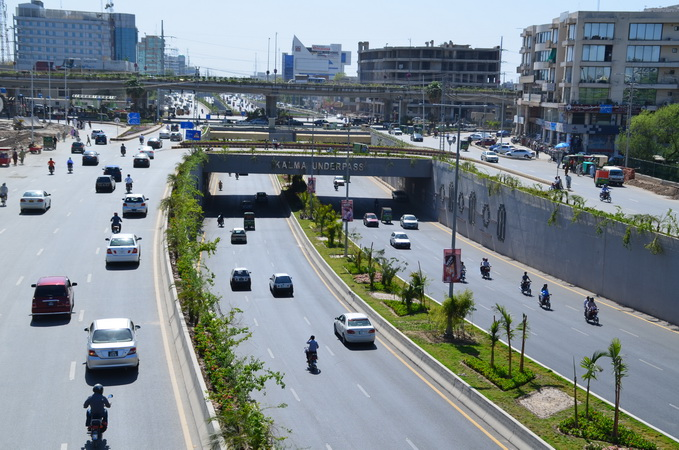
Kalma Underpass in Gulberg

Gulberg (Urdu, Punjabi: گلبرگ) is an Neighbourhood in Lahore, Punjab, Pakistan. It forms one of the 10 zones of the Lahore Metropolitan Area.

Gulberg is known for being Lahore's Central Business District (CBD Punjab) with multiple high-rise buildings, businesses and restaurants. It is located within the Lahore Metropolitan Area and serves as a gateway between the more suburban societies of Lahore such as Johar Town with the Cantonment and the DHA Phases.

Gulberg is also considered to be one of the most exclusive residential places in Lahore and acts as a financial powerhouse. The name "Gulberg" is a combination of the Persian "gul" (flower) and a Punjabi inflection of the Persian word "bagh", meaning an open park. Gulberg was famous in the past for large gardens, hence the name.

It hosts as Lahore's foremost hub for businesses with multiple tall buildings and skyscrapers such as Askari Tower, Monal Tower, Indigo Heights and more. Many Lahorites find it a haven for local and foreign cuisine. It also contains Pakistan's major sports complex having Pakistan's largest cricket stadium, the Gaddafi Stadium, the hockey stadium and athletics stadium. Gulberg also plays as a major role in the economy of Lahore, such as malls hotels, businesses, restaurants and IT based in the town and its dazzling MM Alarm Road and Liberty Park.

In recent years, development has skyrocketed as towering buildings are being erected to accommodate the growing population and foreign investments through businesses. Educational institutes such as the Foreman Christian College (FC College) alongside others form the bulwark of education within the zone.

Gulberg's main boulevard is a 3.7km signal free corridor laden with electronic posters and neon lights entwined together depicting the Lahori culture. The light posts and a stunning green belt with wide roads are surrounded by high rises. The main attractions surrounding are the Liberty Market, MM Alarm Road, Hafeez Center and the CBD Punjab District, which has replaced the now defunct Walton Airstrip. The alleys contain aesthetic cafes and restaurants with the streets having a clean posh look: a different look from the rest of Lahore.
