= George Cole =

George Cole may refer to:

== Arts and entertainment ==
- George Cole (artist) (1810–1883), English landscape painter, father of George Vicat Cole
- George Vicat Cole (1833–1893), English painter
- G. Emerson Cole (1919–2012), George Emerson Cole, American TV and radio announcer, DJ
- George Cole (actor) (1925–2015), British film and television actor
- George Cole (musician) (born 1960), American guitarist, gypsy jazz, bluegrass
- George C. Cole a.k.a. Paul St. Peter, American voice actor

== Military ==
- George W. Cole (1827–1875), officer in the Union Army during the American Civil War
- George M. Cole (1853–1933), British-born American major general
- George Cole (British Army officer) (1911–1973), British Army general

== Politics ==
- George B. Cole (1900–1970), Canadian politician
- George Edward Cole (1826–1906), Governor of the Territory of Washington
- George James Cole, Baron Cole (1911–1979), British industrialist and politician
- George Cole (Tasmanian politician) (1908–1969), Australian senator for Tasmania
- George Ward Cole (1793–1879), Australian politician, member of Victorian Legislative Council
- George Cole (South Australian politician) (1823–1893), South Australian abolitionist politician

== Sports ==
- George Cole (cricketer) (1885–1964), English cricketer
- George Cole (American football) (1906–1978), American football player, coach, and college athletics administrator
- George Cole (footballer), Gambian footballer in 2005 FIFA U-17 World Championship squads and List of Estonian football transfers winter 2012–13

== Other ==
- Sir George Cole (died 1624), English barrister
- George Watson Cole (1850–1939), American librarian and bibliographer
- G. D. H. Cole (1889–1959), English political theorist, economist, and historian

== See also ==
- George Coles (disambiguation)
- George Cole (academic)
