= Hers to Hold =

1943 film by Frank Ryan

- Theatrical release poster
- Directed by: Frank Ryan
- Screenplay by: Lewis R. Foster
- Produced by: Felix Jackson
- Starring: Deanna Durbin; Joseph Cotten
- Cinematography: Elwood Bredell
- Edited by: Ted J. Kent
- Music by: Frank Skinner
- Production company: Universal Pictures
- Distributed by: Universal Pictures
- Release date: July 16, 1943 (USA)
- Running time: 94 minutes
- Country: United States
- Language: English
- Box office: $1.7 million (US rentals)

Hers to Hold (aka Three Smart Girls Join Up) is a 1943 American romantic musical comedy film and is the third film in Three Smart Girls trilogy. In Hers to Hold, Deanna Durbin reprises her role as Penny Craig, who is the only sister remaining at home.

== Plot ==
Vega Aircraft Corporation employees pilot Bill Morley, a former Flying Tiger, is awaiting commissioning with the United States Army Air Forces. Along with his sidekick Rosey, he is donating blood for the American Red Cross. During their mandatory rest period following the donation, the pair sight a bevy of photographers following singing socialite Penny Craig giving her donation. As all donors are given the temporary use of hospital white coats, wolf bachelor Bill sees his chance to get Penny's address and details by impersonating a doctor.

Bill continues his doctor charade when he and Rosey crash a society soiree held by Penny's parents. Penny decides to get her revenge by attempting to humiliate Bill by turning him over to one of the Craig family's raving hypochondriac friends and introducing him to a real medical professional. The embarrassed but still cool Bill takes his leave but not before publicly kissing Penny. Penny instantly falls in love with Bill and tracks him down by getting a job herself at the Vega Aircraft Factory as a riveter that also satisfies her desire to help the war effort.

Between working and singing, Penny schemes to keep Bill from going on active service and although Bill is slowly finding his way with Penny he is afraid of leaving her a widow during World War II.

== Cast ==
- Deanna Durbin as Penelope "Penny" Craig
- Joseph Cotten as Bill Morley
- Charles Winninger as Judson Craig
- Nella Walker as Dorothy Craig
- Ludwig Stössel as Binns
- Gus Schilling as Rosey Blake
- Samuel S. Hinds as Dr. Crane
- Evelyn Ankers as Flo Simpson
- Iris Adrian as Arlene

== Production ==
Hers to Hold was originally planned to be filmed in 1942 and titled Three Smart Girls Join Up to be directed by Jean Renoir and produced by Bruce Manning with a screenplay by Paul Gallico and Richard J. Collins. It was based on a story by RAF pilot Derek Bolto, who sold it to Universal's office in London. The studio announced this project in April. It was to be Durbin's first film following her suspension by Universal in October 1941.

The pair were replaced when the producer felt that the film should be about the relationship of the three Craig sisters at home rather than the submitted screenplay about Penny's relationship with the other workers at the aircraft plant. In April Kay Van Riper was signed to do the script.

Filming was to start on 15 May 1942. Then in April Universal decided to put Durbin in The Amazing Mrs. Holliday first and assigned Renoir to that film, but he would not complete it.

In December, Universal announced that Bruce Manning, who produced and took over direction of Holliday would possibly produce and direct Smart Girls.

In January 1943 Universal revived the project. Frank Ryan, who worked on the script for The Amazing Mrs. Holliday, was attached to direct, and the title was changed as Hers to Hold.

The title was changed as the screenplay concentrated on Penny's romance with a flier and Penny being the only one of the Craig sisters to appear in the film; a line in the screenplay mentions that she will write letters to her unseen sisters. Reference to the other films of the series appear as Penny's father shows home movies of scenes from those films.

In March, Joseph Cotten was borrowed from David O. Selznick to play Durbin's leading man. Evelyn Ankers was given the second female lead.

=== Shooting ===
Filming took place in May 1943. Hers to Hold was shot on location at the Vega Aircraft Factory in Burbank, California on Sundays, to avoid disruption of aircraft manufacture and at the Lockheed Air Terminal. The Boeing B-17 Flying Fortress shown being built in the film flew several combat missions with the Eighth Air Force over Europe, where it was named Tinkertoy. Tinkertoy was considered a "jinx ship" that no one wanted to fly in, due to its crews suffering an unusual number of frequent and gruesome deaths. (Note: Tinkertoy was lost in a mission over Germany on December 20, 1943.)

Durbin was particularly proud of the music numbers in the film.

== Soundtrack ==
- Seguidilla

from Carmen
Music by Georges Bizet
Libretto by Henri Meilhac and Ludovic Halévy
Sung by Deanna Durbin

- Begin the Beguine

Written by Cole Porter
Sung by Deanna Durbin

- Say a Prayer for the Boys Over There

Music by Jimmy McHugh
Lyrics by Herb Magidson
Sung by Deanna Durbin

- Kashmiri Song

Music by Amy Woodforde-Finden
Lyrics by Lawrence Hope
Sung by Deanna Durbin

== Reception ==
A contemporary review in Variety, noted that "in Hers to Hold, Deanna Durbin successfully and permanently completes transition from cinematic sub-deb to young ladyhood. ... Durbin again demonstrates capabilities in carrying acting responsibilities of lead, with her four song numbers neatly spotted along the way". The review also indicated: "Story, although lightly contrived, generates audience attention through the deft business generously inserted in the script and carried through via direction".

Although concentrating on the aviation aspects of the production, aviation film historian James M. Farmer in Celluloid Wings: The Impact of Movies on Aviation (1984), characterized that Hers to Hold (was) "a lightweight formula romance".

== Awards ==
The song "Say a Pray'r for the Boys Over There" from Hers to Hold was nominated for Best Song at the 16th Academy Awards.
