= Garden of Kama =

1901 book by Adela Florence Nicolson

The Garden of Kama
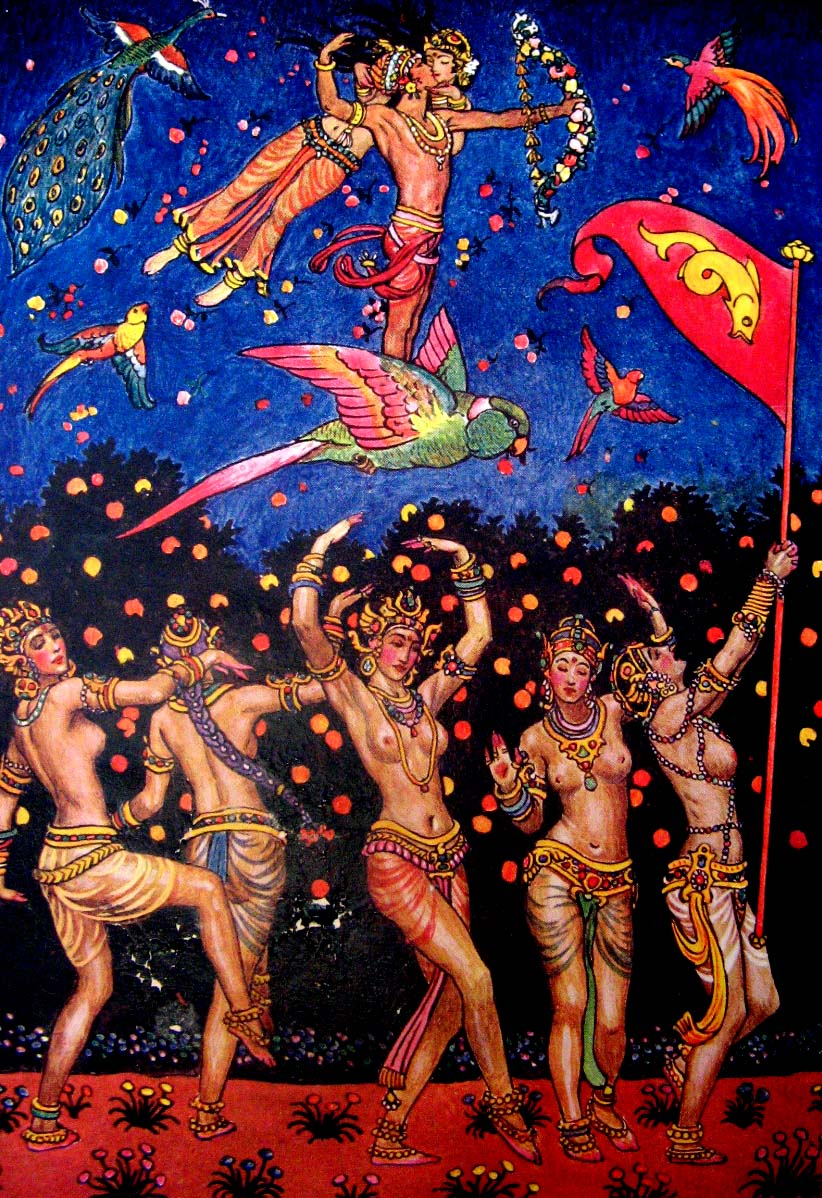
- Illustration by Byam Shaw for The Garden of Kama
- Author: Laurence Hope
- Original title: India's Love Lyrics
- Illustrator: Byam Shaw
- Cover artist: Byam Shaw
- Language: English
- Subject: Love
- Genre: Poetry
- Publisher: Garden City Publishing Company, Inc.
- Publication date: 1942
- Publication place: United States
- Media type: Hardcover
- Pages: 188
- Followed by: Last Poems

The Garden of Kama is a book of lyric poetry published in 1901 and written by Adela Florence Nicolson under the pseudonym Laurence Hope. It was illustrated by Byam Shaw. The poems in the book were given as translations of Indian poets by a man, as she thought the book would receive much more attention than it would likely have done if she had published it under her own name.

The poetry in this volume was characteristic of all of Nicolson's poems, making liberal use of the imagery and symbols from the poets of the North-West Frontier of India and the Sufi poets of Persia. The poems are typically about unrequited love and loss.

The book was initially praised upon its release by many prominent poets, Thomas Hardy among them, although some reviewers were uncertain about the authenticity of the translations. James Darmesteter, Professor of Persian at the prestigious College de France, Paris, embarrassingly documented that the images used by the supposed frontier bards were in reality symbols of the latent Sufi nature of their songs. They were later exposed as being original works from the West, although partly inspired by the Sufi.

The book was published in America in 1927 as India's Love Lyrics.

== See also ==
- "Kashmiri Song", a poem from the collection, set to music by Amy Woodforde-Finden in 1902
