= Shalimar Bagh, Srinagar =

Mughal garden at Dal Lake, Srinagar, Jammu and Kashmir

Shalimar Bagh
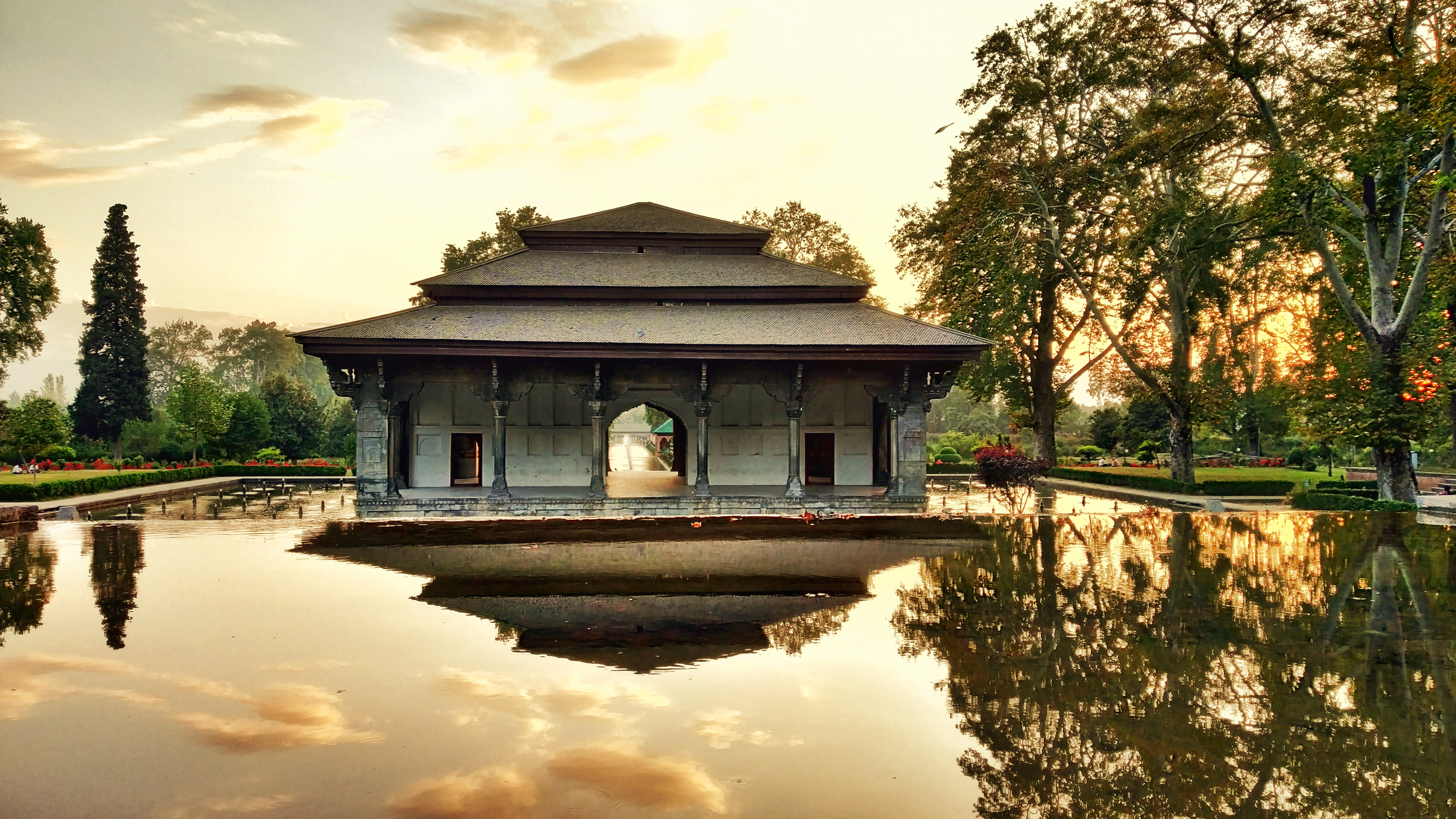
- Shalimar Bagh's marble pavilion
- Interactive map of Shalimar Bagh
- Type: Mughal garden
- Location: Srinagar, Indian-administered Jammu and Kashmir
- Coordinates: 34°8′32.48″N 74°51′46.48″E
- Area: 12.4 hectares (31 acres)
- Opened: 1619 CE
- Founder: Jahangir
- Designer: Jahangir
- Owner: Jammu and Kashmir Tourism Department
- Operator: Jammu and Kashmir Tourism Department
- Website: srinagar.nic.in

Shalimar Bagh (Urdu pronunciation: [ʃɑːliːmɑːr bɑːɣ] ; Kashmiri pronunciation: [ʃaːlɨməːr baːɣ]) is a Mughal garden in Srinagar, Indian-administered Jammu and Kashmir, located at the northeast of Dal Lake. It is also known as Shalimar Garden, Farah Baksh, and Faiz Baksh. The other famous shoreline garden in the vicinity is Nishat Bagh, 'The Garden of Delight'. The garden was built by Mughal emperor Jahangir in 1619 and is considered the high point of Mughal horticulture. It is now a public park and also referred to as the "Crown of Srinagar".

It is the earliest of the Mughal imperial gardens called Shalimar Gardens, followed by the one in Lahore, begun in 1641 under Shah Jahan and the one in Delhi, begun in 1653 by Izz-un-Nissa, his wife.

== Etymology ==
Several other Mughal gardens situated in India and Pakistan share the name 'Shalimar'. Although the exact origin of the name remains unknown, a plausible etymology could be mixed Persian-Arabic expression shah al-‘imarat (Master of Buildings). It has also been suggested that the name is derived from two Kashmiri words, 'shali' (lit. 'rice paddy') and 'mar' (lit. 'black loamy soil'), giving its meaning as 'black soil for growing rice paddy'.

== History ==
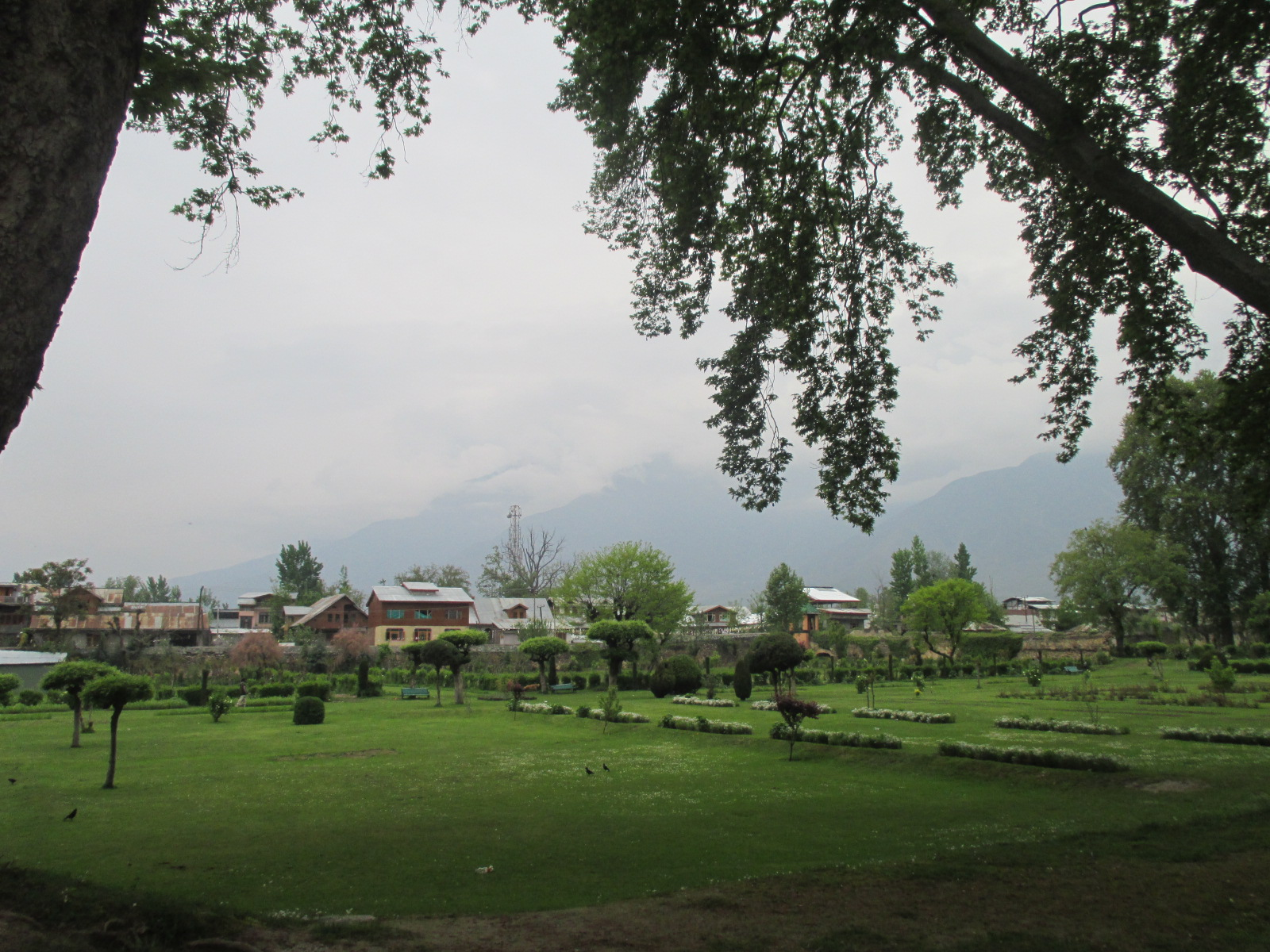
A view of Shalimar Bagh

Shalimar Bagh was built by Mughal emperor Jahangir in 1619. He enlarged the ancient garden in 1619 into a royal garden and called it 'Farah Baksh' ('the delightful'). In 1630, under emperor Shah Jahan’s orders, Zafar Khan, the governor of Kashmir, extended it. He named it ‘Faiz Baksh’ ('the bountiful').

It then became a pleasure place for the Sikh governors of the province after 1819. During the rule of maharaja Ranjit Singh, the marble pavilion was the guest house for European visitors. Electrification of the premises was done during maharaja Hari Singh’s rule. Thus, over the years, the garden was extended and improved by many rulers and called by different names, but the most popular name, ‘Shalimar Bagh’, continues to this day.

During the Mughal period, in particular, emperor Jahangir and his wife Nur Jahan were so enamoured of Kashmir that during summer, they moved to Srinagar with their full-court entourage from Delhi at least 13 times. Shalimar Bagh was their imperial summer residence and the Royal Court. They crossed the arduous snowy passes of the Pir Panjal mountain range on elephants to reach Srinagar.

== Layout ==
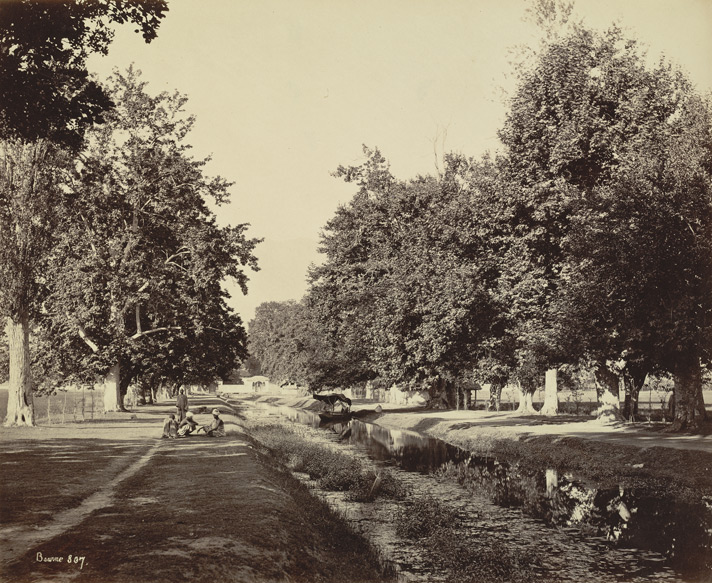
Entrance channel to Shalimar Bagh from Dal Lake, 1864 view

The layout of the garden is an adaptation of another Islamic garden layout known as the Persian gardens. The garden was built on flat land on a square plan with four radiating arms from a central location as the water source. It needed to be modified to suit the hilly terrain and availability of a well, which could be diverted from a higher elevation to the planned gardens. Modifications involved the main channel running through the garden axially from the top to the lowest point. This central channel, known as the Shah Nahar, is the main axis of the garden. It runs through three terraces. This layout left out the radial arms, and the shape became rectangular, instead of a square plan of the Chahar Bagh.

The garden covers an area of 12.4 hectares (31 acres) built with a size of 587 metres (1,926 ft) length on the main axis channel and with a total width of 251 metres (823 ft). The garden has three terraces fitted with fountains and with chinar (sycamore) tree-lined vistas. The Shahnahar is the main feeder channel to all the terraces. Each one of the three terraces has a specific role.

The garden was linked to the open Dal Lake water through a canal of about 1.6 kilometres (0.99 mi) length and 11 metres (36 ft) in width that ran through the swampy quagmire. Willow groves and rice terraces fringed the lake edge. Broad green paths bordered the lake with rows of chinar trees. The garden was laid in trellised walkways lined by avenues of aspen trees planted at 0.61 metres (2 ft 0 in) intervals.

== Architecture ==
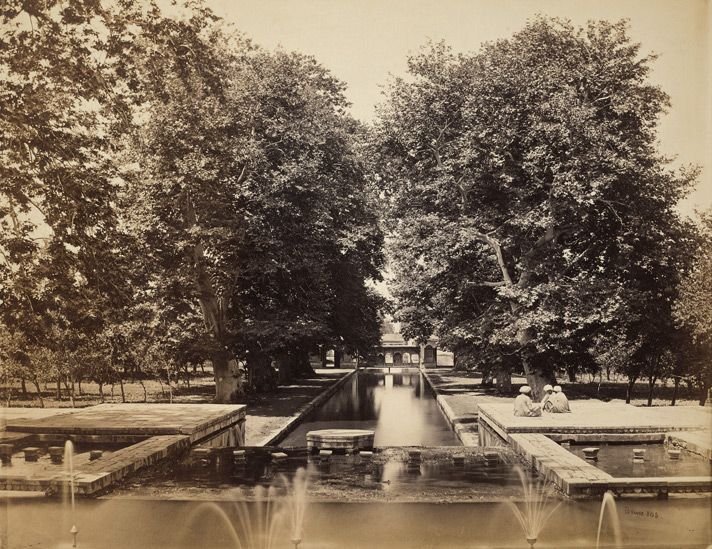
View of Shalimar Bagh

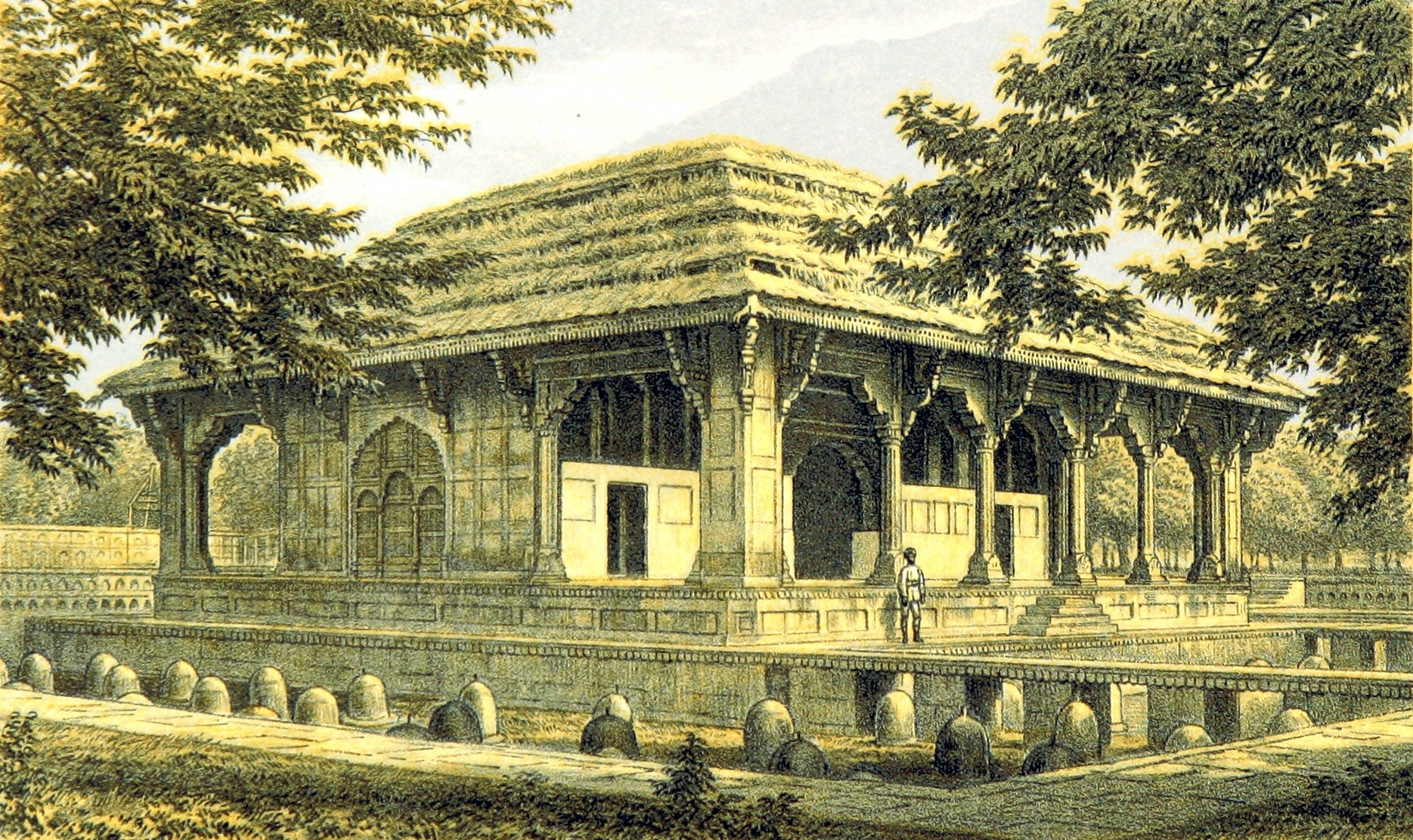
The marble pavilion

The architectural details of the three terraces of the garden are elaborate.

The first terrace is a public garden or the outer garden ending in the Diwan-e-Aam (public audience hall). In this hall, a small black marble throne was installed over the waterfall.

The second terrace garden along the axial canal, slightly broader, has two shallow terraces. The Diwan-e-Khas (the Hall of Private Audience), which was accessible only to the noblemen or guests of the court, now derelict, is in its centre. However, the carved stone bases and a fine platform surrounded by fountains are still seen. The royal bathrooms are located on the north-west boundary of this enclosure. The fountain pools of the Diwan-e-Khas, the Diwan-e-Aam, and in turn, the Zenana terrace are supplied in succession. It has 410 fountains.

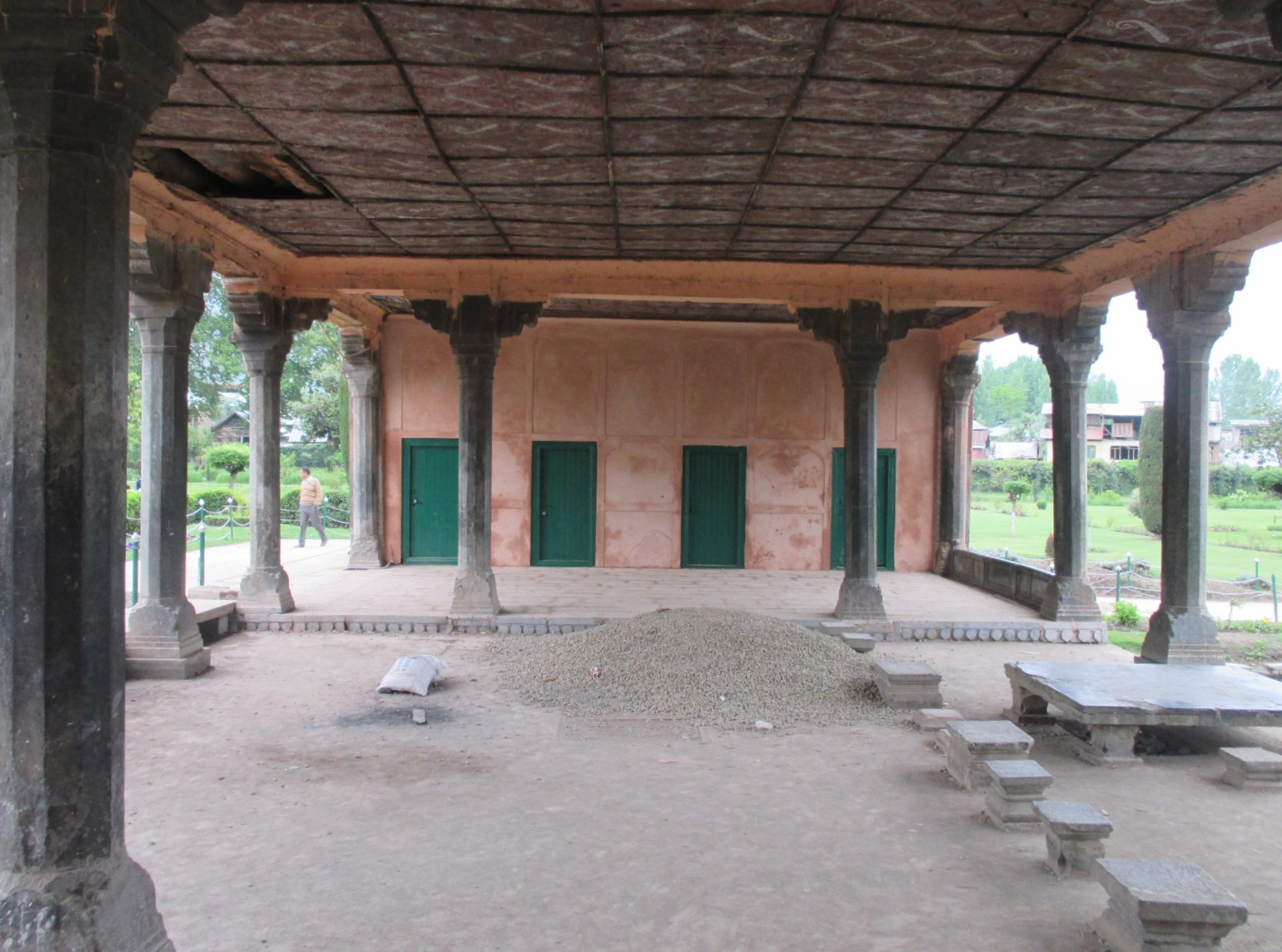
Mughal era architecture, inside of the Shalimar Bagh, Srinagar.

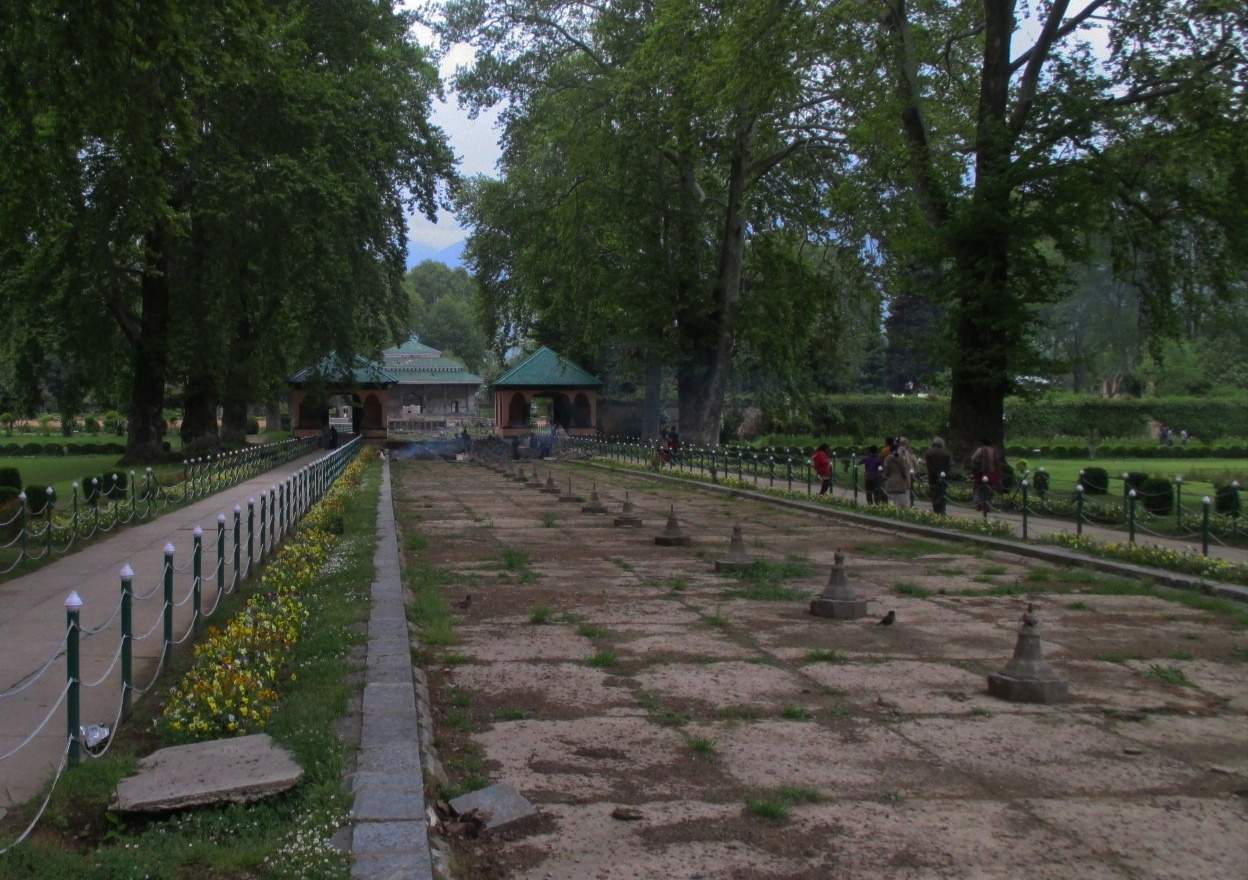
Shalimar Bagh in Srinagar, April 2013.

In the third terrace, the axial water channel flows through the Zenana garden, which is flanked by the Diwan-e-Khas and chinar trees. At the entrance to this terrace, there are two small pavilions or guard rooms (built in Kashmir style on a stone plinth) that are the restricted and controlled entry zone of the royal harem. Shah Jahan built a baradari of black marble, called the Black Pavilion, in the zenana garden. It is encircled by a fountain pool that receives its supply from a higher terrace. A double cascade falls against a low wall carved with small niches (chini khanas), behind the pavilion. Two smaller, secondary water canals lead from the Black Pavilion to a small baradari. Above the third level, two octagonal pavilions define the end wall of the garden. The baradari has a lovely backdrop of the snow mountains, which is considered a befitting setting for the Bagh.

The Shalimar Bagh is well known for chini khanas, or arched niches, behind garden waterfalls. They are a unique feature in the Bagh. These niches were lit at night with oil lamps, which gave a fairytale appearance to the waterfalls. However, now the niches hold pots of flowers that reflect their colours behind the cascading water.

Another unusual architectural feature mentioned is the doors of the Baradari. In the garden complex, the Baradari had four exquisite doors made of stone supported by pillars. It is conjectured that these stone doors were ruins from old temples that were demolished by Shahjahan. The garden also provided large water troughs where a variety of fountains were fixed.

It has been aptly described by a chronicler glowingly:

A subtle air of leisure and repose, a romantic indefinable spell, pervades the royal Shalimar: this leafy garden of dim vistas, shallow terraces, smooth sheets of falling water, and wide canals, with calm reflections broken only by the stepping stones across the streams.

Even in later years, during Maharaja's rule, the gardens were well maintained and continue to be so even now as it is one of the prominent visitor attractions around the Dal Lake.

The garden is considered to be very beautiful during the autumn and spring seasons due to the colour change in the leaves of the famed Chinar trees.

The gardens were the inspiration for other gardens of the same name, notably the Shalimar Bagh, Delhi in Delhi (built in 1653, which now also has an upscale colony), and Shalimar Gardens in Lahore, Pakistan, built by Emperor Shah Jahan in 1641.

The black pavilion built during the early part of Jahangir's reign (1569–1627), in the top terrace of the Shalimar Bagh, has the famous inscription in Persian, which says:

اگر فردوس بر روے زمین است
همین است و همین است و همین است
Agar Firdaus bar rōy-e zamin ast,
hamin ast-o hamin ast-o hamin ast.

The Persian language poet Amir Khusrau is generally said to be the original author of this couplet, which is inscribed on many buildings in the Indian subcontinent, although it has also been attributed to Shah Jahan's grand vizier Sa'adullah Khan, and Jahangir himself.

Translated to English, it means:

If there is a paradise on earth, it is here, it is here, it is here.

When Jahangir was reportedly asked on his deathbed about his cherished desire, he is credited with saying:

Kashmir, the rest is worthless.

== In popular culture ==
The poem "Kashmiri Song" by Laurence Hope (pseudonym of Violet Nicolson) opens with the line referring to Shalimar:

Pale hands I loved beside the Shalimar

— Four Indian Lyrics, "Kashmiri Song", p.13

The song was set to music by Amy Woodforde-Finden and was very popular in Europe. Salman Rushdie's 2005 novel Shalimar the Clown refers to the garden in its title as well as the name of the central character, a man who "has turned from a benign, tightrope-walking clown in a Kashmiri village into a Muslim terrorist". The fiction deals with the fate of Kashmir in a world steeped in terrorism as it moves from California to Kashmir. The Globe and Mail praises the book as being a "devastating portrait of the destruction of Kashmir.”

== See also ==
- Achabal Gardens
- Verinag
- Gardens in India
- Indo-Islamic Architecture
