= Byam Shaw =

British painter, illustrator, designer and teacher (1872–1919)

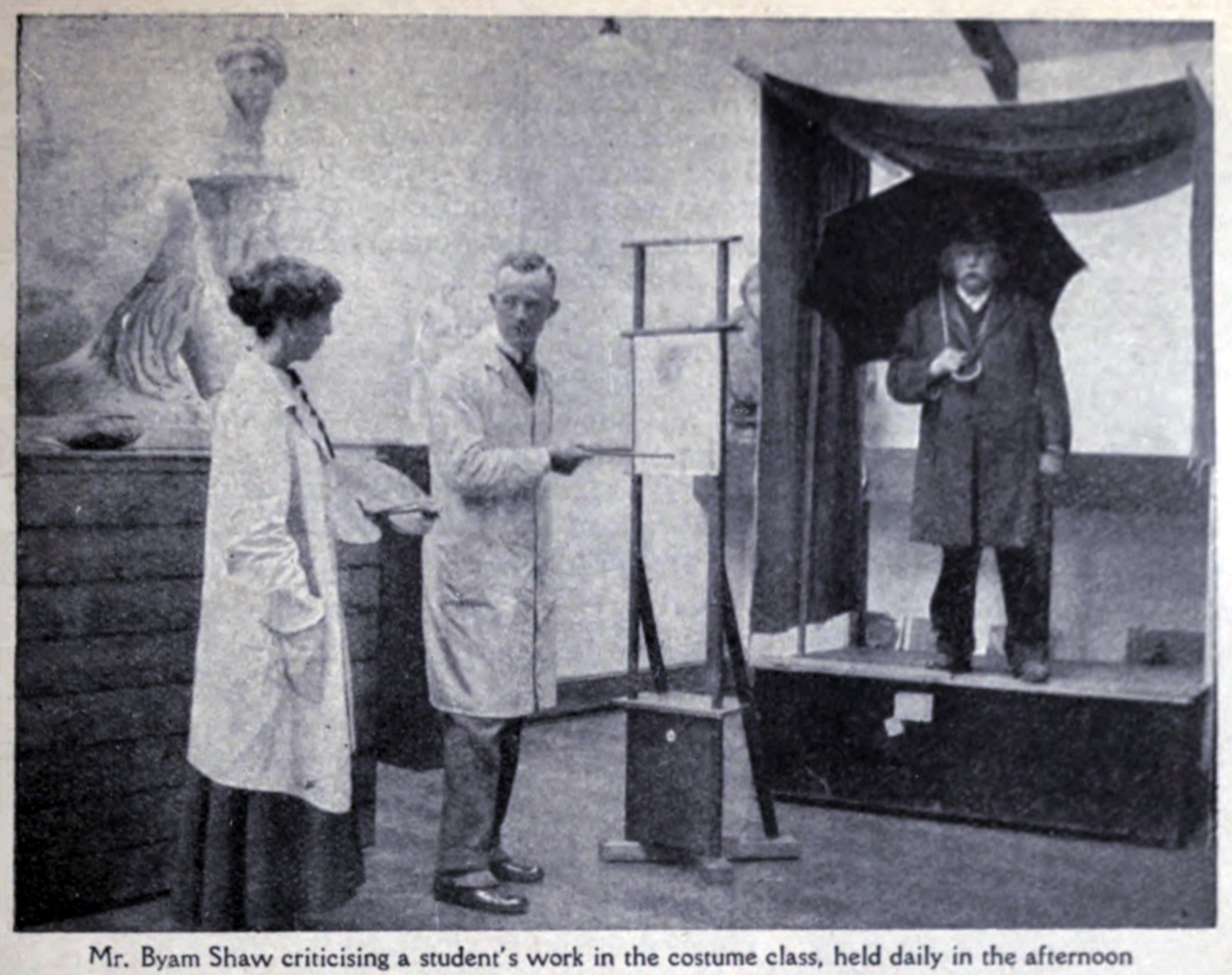
- Shaw criticising a student's work.
- Born: John Byam Liston Shaw; 13 November 1872; Madras, British India
- Died: 26 January 1919 (aged 46); London, England
- Education: St John's Wood Art Schools; Royal Academy Schools
- Known for: Painting, illustration
- Awards: Armitage Prize

John Byam Liston Shaw (13 November 1872 – 26 January 1919), commonly known as Byam Shaw, was a British painter, illustrator, designer and teacher. He is not to be confused with his sons, Glen Byam Shaw, actor and theatre director, and James Byam Shaw, art historian and director of Colnaghi's, who both used "Byam Shaw" as a surname.

== Family ==
John Byam Liston Shaw was the son of John Shaw and his wife, Sophia Alicia Byam Gunthorpe. In 1899, Byam Shaw married the artist, Evelyn Caroline Eunice Pyke-Nott, later known as Evelyn CE Shaw (1870–1959). Evelyn's sister was Isabel Codrington, another early twentieth century artist. Byam Shaw came from an Ayrshire family of lawyers and clerics. The Ayrshire Shaws were a cadet branch of the Shaws of Tordarroch, chiefs of the Clan Shaw. Byam Shaw's forebears included the two reverend Shaws (father and son) referred to in Burns' "Twa Herds". Evelyn's family, the Pyke-Notts, were gentry from Swimbridge and Parracombe in North Devon.

The couple had five children including the actor and theatre director Glen Byam Shaw and the art historian James 'Jim' Byam Shaw. Their only daughter, Barbara, married Rear-Admiral A.F. Pugsley. Another son, David, a naval officer and destroyer captain, awarded the OBE, was killed at sea during World War II while in command of HMS Stanley, and George, a major in the Royal Scots, was killed at Dunkirk in 1940 while second-in-command of the 1st Battalion. The family is depicted in the artist's semi-autobiographical pastel painting My Wife, My Bairns and My Wee Dog John (1903).

== Life and work ==
Byam Shaw was born in Madras; his father, John, was the registrar of the High Court at Madras. The family returned to England in 1878 where they settled in Kensington, living at 103 Holland Row. He showed early artistic promise, and in 1887 his work was shown to John Everett Millais, who recommended that the 15-year-old should enter the St John's Wood Art School. There, he first met fellow artists Gerald Fenwick Metcalfe (also born in India) and Rex Vicat Cole. He also met Evelyn Pyke-Nott, his future wife, there. From 1890, Shaw studied at the Royal Academy Schools where he won the Armitage Prize in 1892 for his work The Judgement of Solomon.

Throughout his career Byam Shaw worked competently in a wide variety of media including oils, watercolour, pastels, pen and ink and deployed techniques such as dyeing and gilding. He was influenced by the Pre-Raphaelites and took many of his subjects from the poems of Rossetti. He exhibited frequently at Dowdeswell and Dowdeswell's gallery in New Bond Street, where he had at least five solo exhibitions between 1896 and 1916.

Later in his life his popularity as an artist waned, and he turned to teaching for his living. He taught at the Women's Department of King's College London from 1904 and in 1910, with Rex Vicat Cole, he founded the Byam Shaw and Vicat Cole School of Art later renamed simply the "Byam Shaw School of Art". Evelyn Shaw had an active role in the new school, teaching the miniatures class, her area of expertise. Shaw had had a long association with the artist and illustrator Eleanor Fortescue-Brickdale, who taught at the new school.

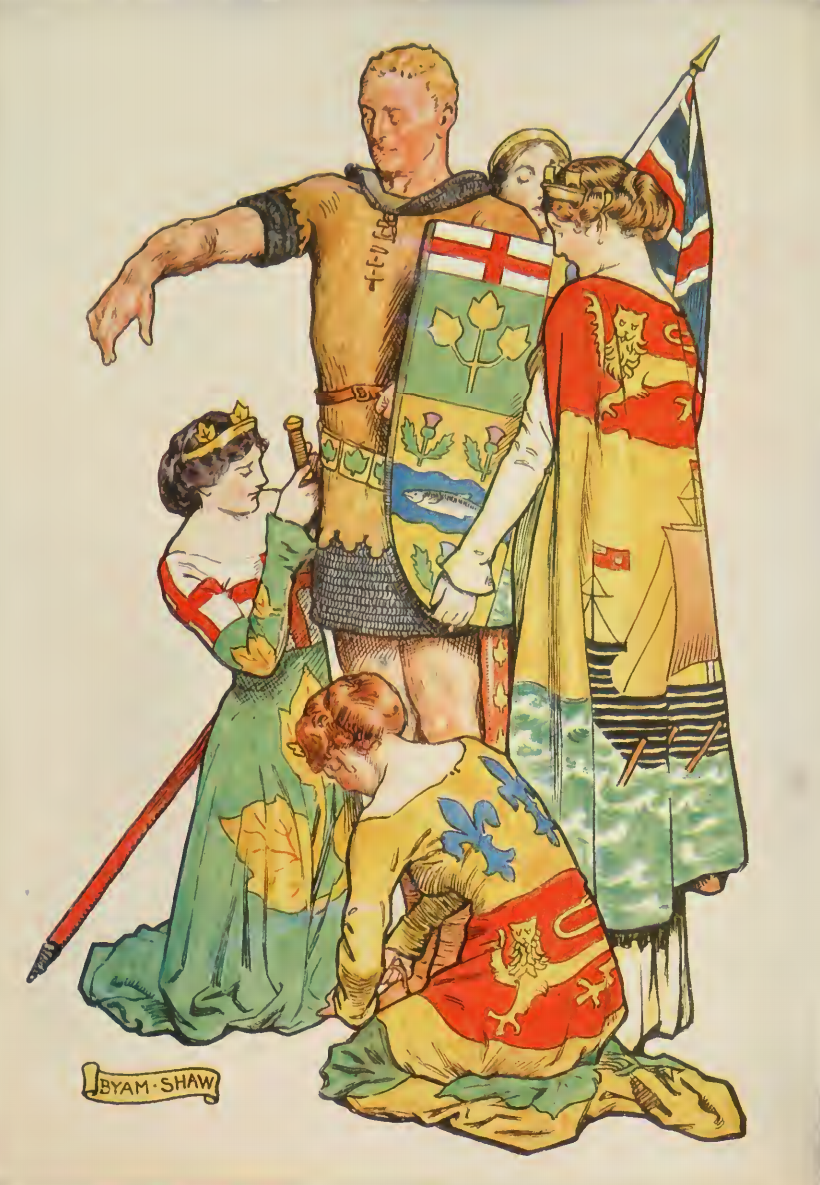
The Call, an illustration by Byam Shaw for Canada in Khaki, published in 1917.

At the outbreak of the First World War Byam Shaw and Vicat Cole enlisted in the Artists Rifles although Shaw soon transferred to the Special Constabulary. He produced war cartoons that were published in many newspapers and also found work with memorial commissions. Not long after the war ended, Shaw collapsed and died at age 46 in the 1918-1919 influenza epidemic and was interred at Kensal Green Cemetery. His funeral was held at St Barnabas', Addison Road. Years before, he had designed two yellow-hued stained glass windows for this church, depicting Saints Cecilia and Margaret. An ornate red, green and gilt monument to his life, in a 15th-century style, still stands there.

== Notable works ==
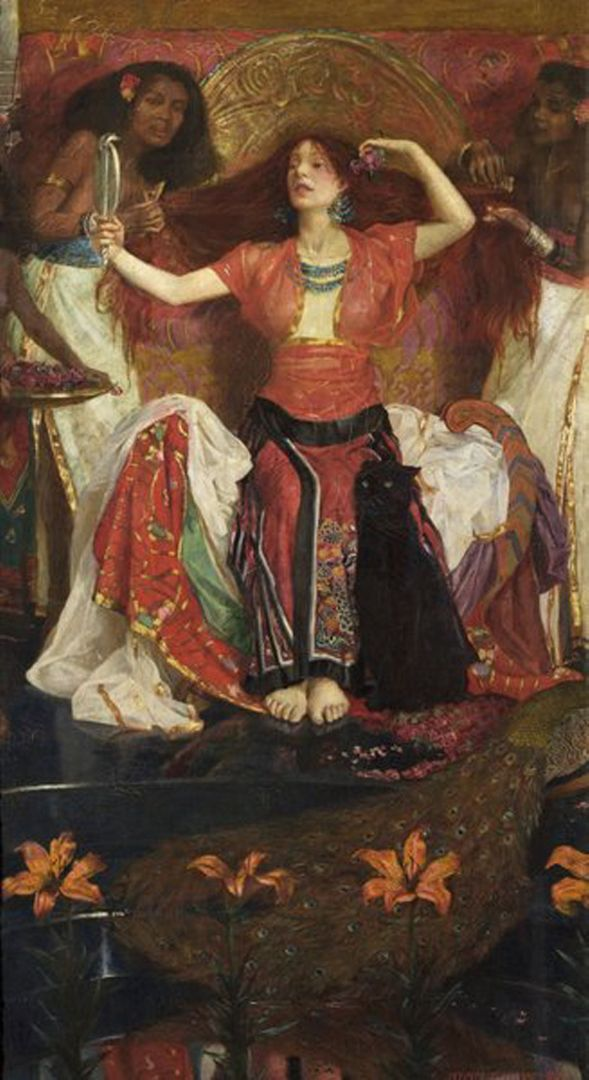
Jezebel

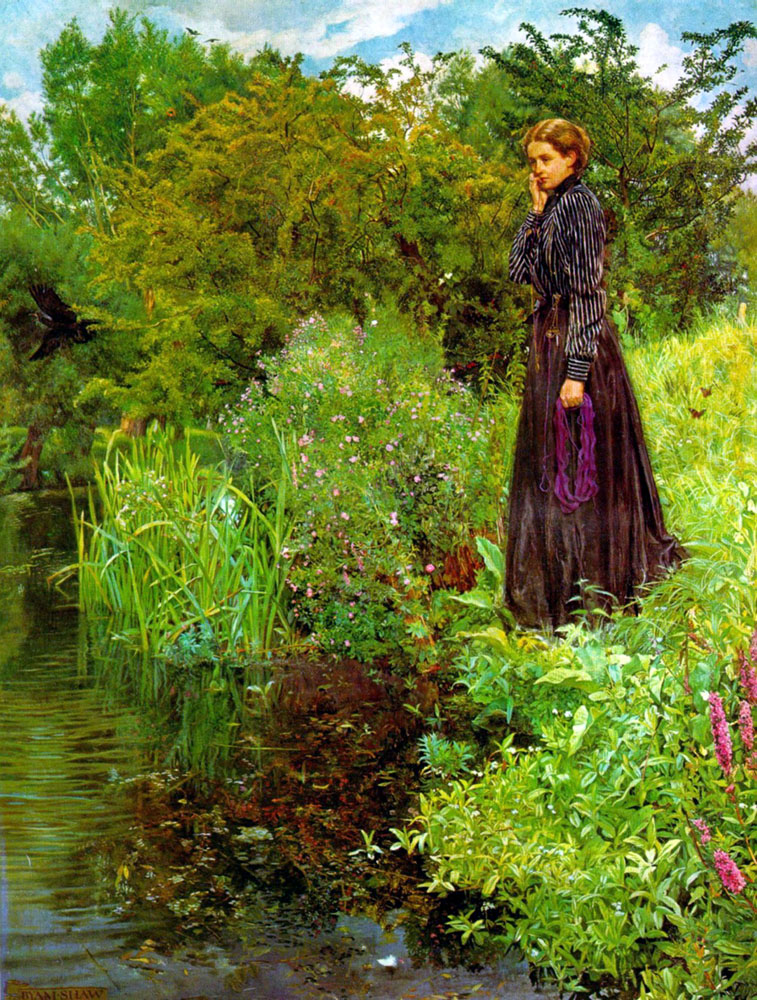
The Boer War

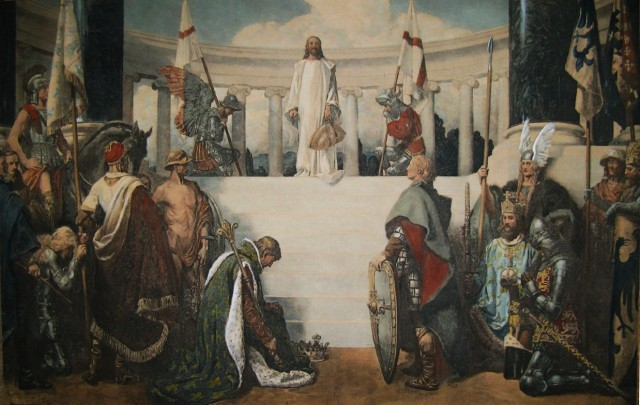
The Greatest of All Heroes is One

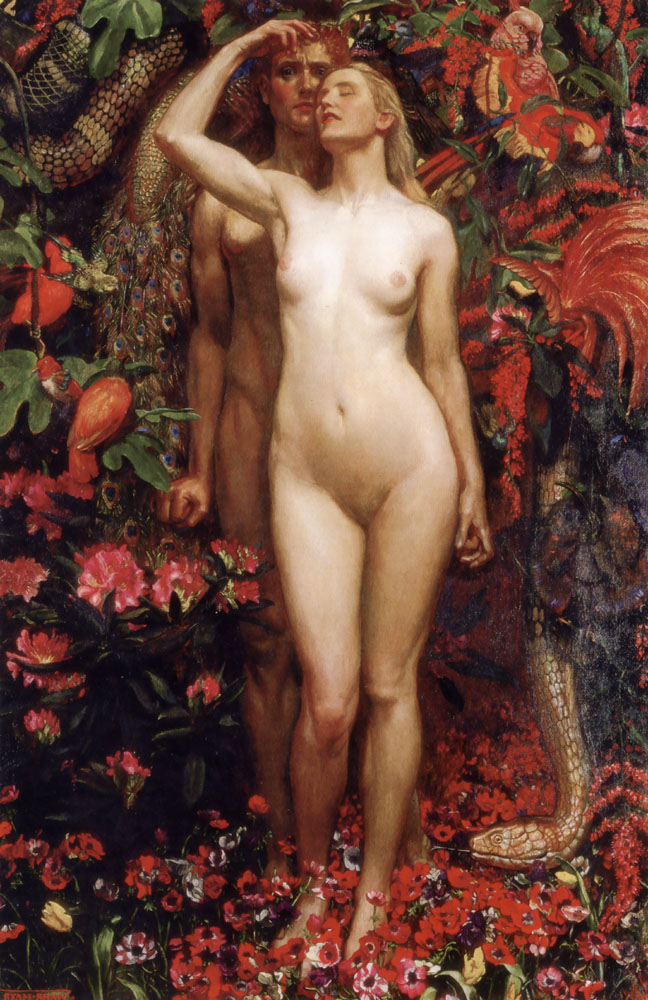
The Woman, the Man and the Serpent

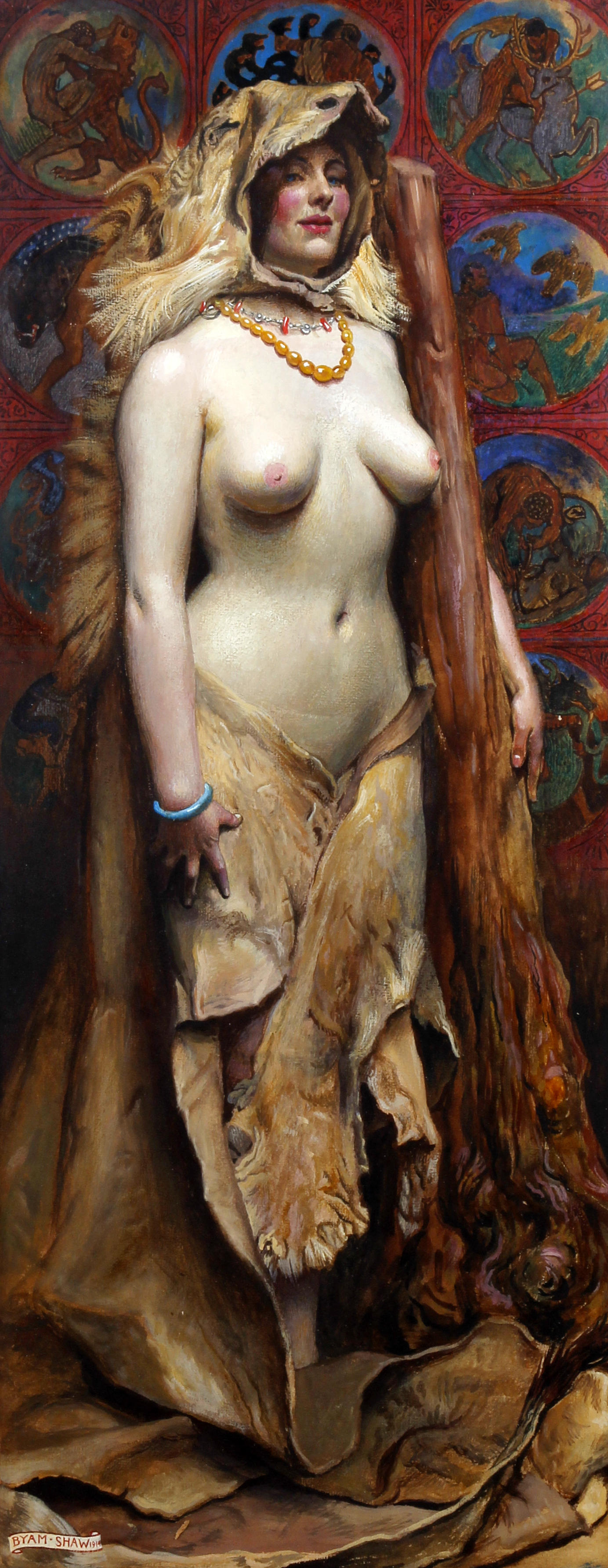
Omphale

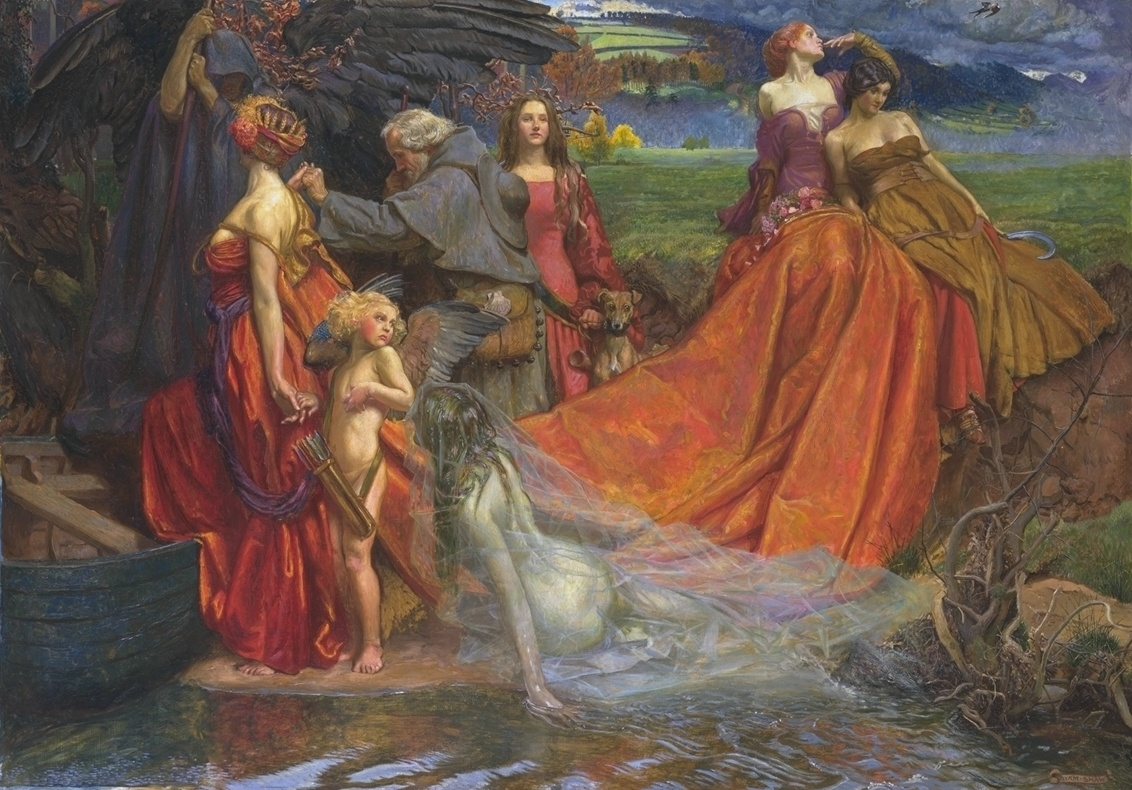
Now Is the Pilgrim Year Fair Autumn's Charge

=== Paintings ===
- Jezebel (1896 – Russell-Cotes Art Gallery & Museum, Bournemouth). The painting, exhibited at the Royal Academy in 1896, originally depicted Jezebel nude, flanked by her hand-maidens. The model was Rachel Lee, a close friend of Byam Shaw. Unable to sell the painting, he later reworked it so that the central figure was shown clothed.
- Love the Conqueror (1899). Now lost, but documented in a series of photographs taken during its creation, Byam Shaw considered this his masterpiece. The work contains over 200 figures. Widely lauded at the time of its exhibition, it is now recognised as somewhat flawed.
- The Boer War (1901, City of Birmingham Museum and Art Gallery). The subtitle for this painting referring to the Second Boer War (1899–1902) is 'Last summer green things were greener, brambles fewer, the blue sky bluer', a Christina Rossetti quote.
- The Greatest of All Heroes is One (1905); inspired by a Thomas Carlyle quote, the painting reinterprets Carlyle's 'Great Man' with a more imperialistic ideal. Another lost work, it included amongst its large cast colonial military heroes of the Victorian era such as General Gordon and General Nicholson standing alongside historical icons like Alexander the Great.
- The Woman, the Man and the Serpent (1911).
- Omphale (1914).
- Love's Baulbes (1897), Walker Art Gallery, Liverpool
- Now is the Pilgrim Year Fair Autumn's Charge (The title of the work is still an enigma)

=== Book illustrations ===
- Browning, Robert (1897), Poems.
- Boccaccio (1899), Tales, Joseph Jacobs trans, G. Allen.
- Chiswick Shakespeare, Works.1899, G. Bell & Sons – 500 plates.
- Hope, Laurence (1901), The Garden of Kama – these illustrations form some of Byam Shaw’s more famous ones.
- Old King Cole's Book of Nursery Rhymes, 25 plates, engraved and printed at the Racquet Court Press by Edmund Evans, published by Macmillan, 1901.
- Historic Record of the Coronation of King Edward VII and Queen Alexandra, 1904 – commissioned to produce 34 illustrations.
- Haggard, H. Rider (1903), Pearl-Maiden: A Tale of the Fall of Jerusalem.
- Rossetti, Dante Gabriel (1906), The Blessed Damozel.
- Hadden, J. Cuthbert (James Cuthbert) (1907), The Great Operas: The Ring of the Nibelung.

=== Other works ===
- Designed costumes for Beerbohm Tree's Much Ado About Nothing at His Majesty's Theatre (1904).
- Assisted Edwin Austin Abbey in the scheme to decorate one of the corridors in the Palace of Westminster with murals.
- Act Drop for the London Coliseum (1914). No longer in existence, the curtain Byam Shaw designed for the Coliseum featured Shakespeare presiding over a court of 101 diverse figures including Gainsborough and Elgar.
- Stained glass for St Barnabas Church, Kensington.
