= Kashmiri Song =

1902 song by Amy Woodforde-Finden

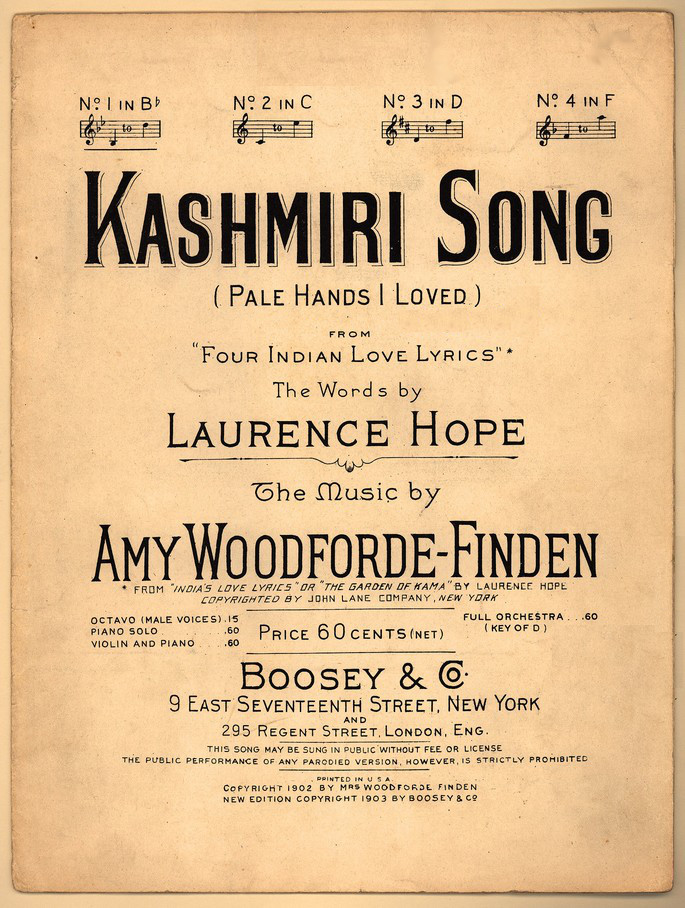
"Kashmiri Song" sheet-music cover

"Kashmiri Song" or "Pale Hands I Loved" is a 1902 song by Amy Woodforde-Finden based on a poem by Laurence Hope, pseudonym of Violet Nicolson.

The poem first appeared in Hope's first collection of poems, The Garden of Kama (1901), also known as India's Love Lyrics.

The following year, when Amy Woodforde-Finden set to music Four Indian Love Lyrics, "Kashmiri Song" emerged as the most popular, quickly becoming a drawing room standard and remaining popular until the Second World War.

== Words ==
Poem: Kashmiri Song Pale hands I loved beside the Shalimar, Where are you now? Who lies beneath your spell? Whom do you lead on Rapture's roadway, far, Before you agonise them in farewell? Oh, pale dispensers of my Joys and Pains, Holding the doors of Heaven and of Hell, How the hot blood rushed wildly through the veins Beneath your touch, until you waved farewell. Pale hands, pink tipped, like Lotus buds that float On those cool waters where we used to dwell, I would have rather felt you round my throat, Crushing out life, than waving me farewell!	Lyrics: Kashmiri Song Pale hands I loved beside the Shalimar,* Where are you now? Who lies beneath your spell? Whom do you lead on Rapture's roadway, far, Before you agonise them in farewell? Pale hands I loved beside the Shalimar, Where are you now? Where are you now? Pale hands, pink tipped, like Lotus buds that float On those cool waters where we used to dwell, I would have rather felt you round my throat, Crushing out life, than waving me farewell! Pale hands I loved beside the Shalimar, Where are you now? Where lies your spell? * Gardens

== Interpretations ==
The phrase "beside the Shalimar" presumably refers to one of two Shalimar Gardens, the Shalimar Gardens in Srinagar (the capital of Kashmir) or the Shalimar Gardens in Lahore. Although the former seems the likelier identification, given the song's title, the fact that Nicolson lived in Lahore gives some weight to the latter.

== Recordings ==
There have been numerous recordings of the song, including:

- Cellist Julian Lloyd Webber on the 2006 album Unexpected Songs
- One of only two Rudolph Valentino recordings, made in 1923.

Among famous singers to record the song in the inter-war years, there are 3 versions by Peter Dawson, two by Frank Titterton, and single versions by John McCormack and Richard Tauber.

== Culture ==
The song has led an unusually varied life particularly in the field of popular culture. Some of the places where the song/poem is mentioned or quoted are:

- The film The Sheik (1921) starring Rudolph Valentino, based on the 1919 novel The Sheik by E. M. Hull.
- Ford Madox Ford's novel Parade's End (1924–1928).
- In the Srinigar section of his 1933 film India Speaks, Richard Halliburton asserts that everyone knows "the Kashmiri song".
- Jack Conroy's novel A World to Win (1935).
- Peter DeRose and Billy Hill's song "On a Little Street in Singapore" seems to reuse a lot of the same words (1939).
- The film This Happy Breed (1944), based on Noël Coward's stage play (1939).
- The film Hers to Hold (1943), sung by Deanna Durbin
- Ross Macdonald's novel, Dark Tunnel (1943)
- Anthony Gilbert's novel, The Black Stage (1945)
- The film Maytime in Mayfair (1948) refers to the song, suggesting it is a cliché.
- Henry Miller's novel, Sexus (1949)
- Daphne du Maurier's novel, The Parasites (1949)
- P. G. Wodehouse's novel, Ring for Jeeves (1953), quoted by captain Biggar
- Anthony Powell's novel, Casanova's Chinese Restaurant (1960), the fifth volume of A Dance to the Music of Time.
- Have Gun – Will Travel, episode 24 of season 6, “Caravan” (1961-62)
- Rising Damp (ITV/Yorkshire Television), Series 3, episode 5. Fawcett's Python. Miss Jones and the curate rehearse the Kashmiri Song, only to be interrupted by an unexpected visitor. (1977)
- It Ain't Half Hot Mum, Episode 1 of Series 1 has Gunner "Lofty" Sugden sing this song before the Top Hat, White Tie and Tails number.
- Gilbert Sorrentino's novel Aberration of Starlight (1980)
- The poet Tom Holt's Lucia in Wartime (after E. F. Benson) (1985), where it is sung by Major Benjie.
- An episode of Agatha Christie's Poirot, 'Trouble at Sea' (1989)
- Salman Rushdie's novel, Midnight’s Children (1981), where Sabarmati plays it on a pianola.
- Vikram Seth's novel, A Suitable Boy (1993)
- A ghazal by Agha Shahid Ali (1997)
- Title of a short story by Anne Enright in her collection, Yesterday's Weather (2008).
- Lorrie Moore's novel, A Gate at the Stairs (2009)
- Tolkien (2019), sung by Patricia Hammond
