= George Cole (artist) =

English painter (1810–1883)

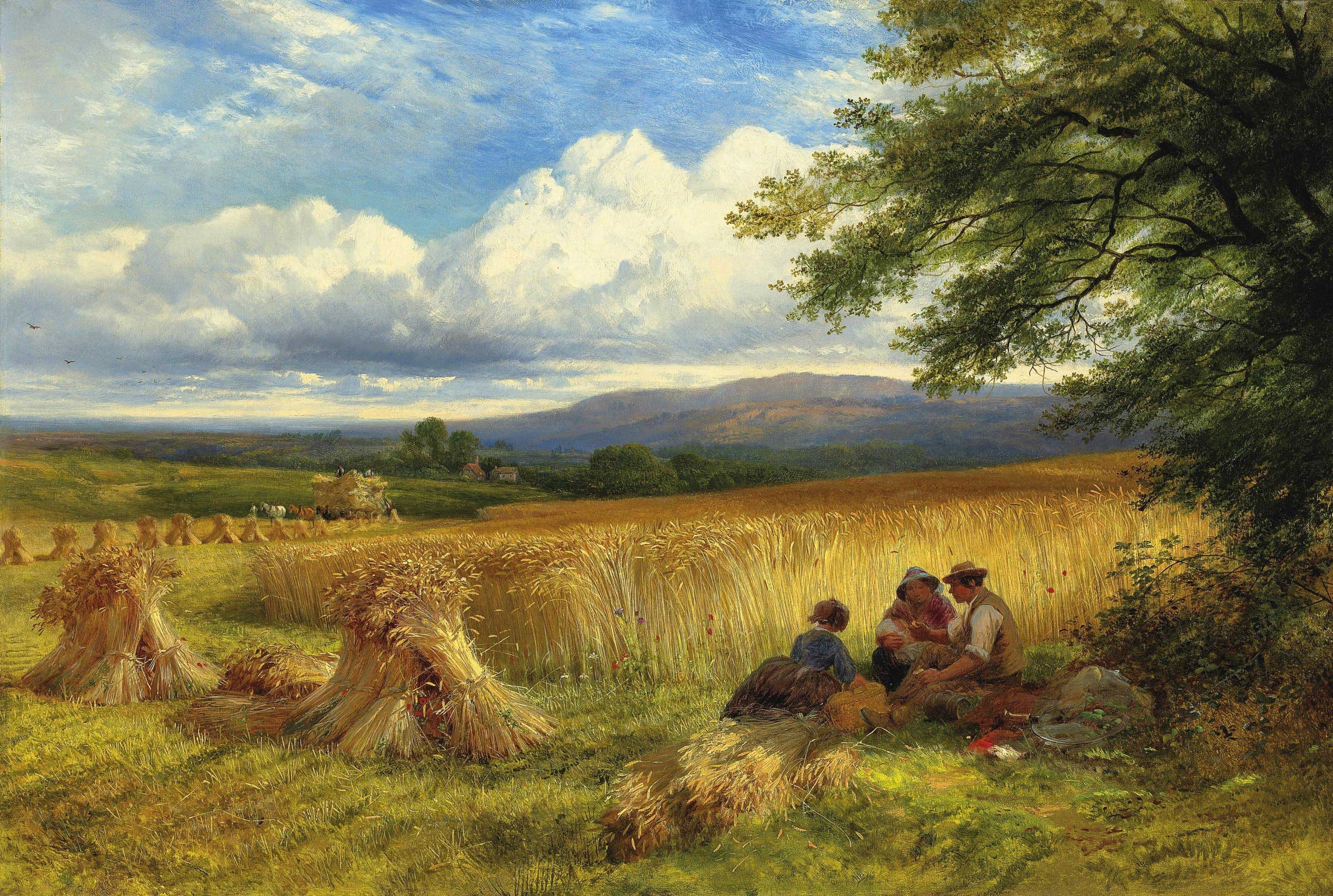
Harvest Rest by George Cole, 1865

George Cole (15 January 1810 – 7 September 1883) was an English painter known for his landscapes and animal paintings.

Cole was born in Portsmouth to James and Elizabeth Cole. His mother died when he was 9 years old.

According to the artist's grandson, Rex Vicat Cole, he was apprenticed to a ship's painter in the Royal Navy dockyards at Portsmouth. He taught himself to paint pictures, at first portraits and animals; he also painted posters for Wombwell's menagerie.

In 1838 Cole's painting The Farm Yard was shown at the Society of British Artists. When he was 30 he changed his focus to landscapes and received instruction from John Wilson and started exhibiting in 1840. One anecdote has him painting the portrait of a Dutch merchant in Portsmouth. After the sitter refused to pay him, saying it was a bad likeness, Cole added wings and put the painting in a shop window with the title The Flying Dutchman. The man's friends recognised him and laughed; he paid for the painting, and Cole painted out the wings. His career has been regarded as a good example of the Victorian self-made man: in 1831 he married Eliza Vicat, of an old French Huguenot family. In 1852 he moved to Fulham and in 1855 to Kensington, where he lived for the rest of his life. In the mid-1860s he purchased Coombe Lodge, a small estate in Hampshire.

By 1850 Cole had begun to concentrate on landscape, drawing on Dutch precedents for compositions such as London Road, Portsdown (1847, Portsmouth City Museum and Art Gallery). Working alongside him in the early 1850s was George Vicat Cole (1833–1893), the eldest of Cole's five children. In search of sketching grounds they visited the river valleys of the Wye, Teign, and Dart and, in 1851 or 1852, the Moselle. While the father undoubtedly instructed the son, it seems likely that the influence of Pre-Raphaelitism, absorbed more fully by the younger artist, was transmitted through his work to the father. After a temporary estrangement in 1855 the two never worked together again. George Cole's landscapes of the later 1850s are, however, less formulaic than his early works and are often a combination of rustic genre subjects with carefully observed landscape, as in Landscape and Cattle (1858, Russell-Cotes Art Gallery and Museum, Bournemouth).

In a series of richly coloured and detailed landscapes on large canvases executed during the 1860s and 1870s, Cole created an idealized version of the Hampshire moorlands and agricultural landscape; examples include Fern Carting, Harting Coombe (1873, Russell-Cotes Art Gallery and Museum, Bournemouth). Cattle continued to play an important role in his compositions, and he specialized in the depiction of river scenery with cows watering, including, for example, Windsor Castle (1876, exh. RA, 1878; Anglesey Abbey). Reassuring in their presentation of a seemingly timeless Englishness, these images were eagerly purchased by Victorian collectors.

Although he exhibited sixteen works at the Royal Academy, Cole's work formed a mainstay of the exhibitions of the Society of British Artists at Suffolk Street, where he exhibited 209 paintings from 1838 until his death in 1883. He was elected a member in 1850, became auditor in 1856, and vice-president in 1867. He was also awarded a medal for a harvesting scene in 1864 by the Society for the Encouragement of the Fine Arts. While, at his best, he was capable of sophisticated effects, the sheer volume of his production of smaller works, sold directly to dealers such as Thomas McLean and Arthur Tooth, inevitably led to a lowering of standards. His annual income rose from £842 in 1858 to £2580 in 1873.

A collector of topographical literature and an autodidact, Cole was reputed to know the works of Shakespeare by heart. Robert Chignell, the biographer of George Vicat Cole, saw the older painter as an exemplar of self-help: ‘one who began with nothing’, he had achieved success through ‘great capabilities and force of character’ (Chignell, 40). George Cole died on 7 September 1883 at his home at 1 Kensington Crescent and was buried in Kensal Green cemetery, London. Of his other children, Alfred Benjamin Cole was also an artist.

== Selected works ==
- Don Quixote and Sancho Panza
- Loch Lubnaig
- A River Scene, Sussex (1874)
- Evening on the Thames (1877)
- Windsor Castle—Morning (1878)
Paintings by George Cole

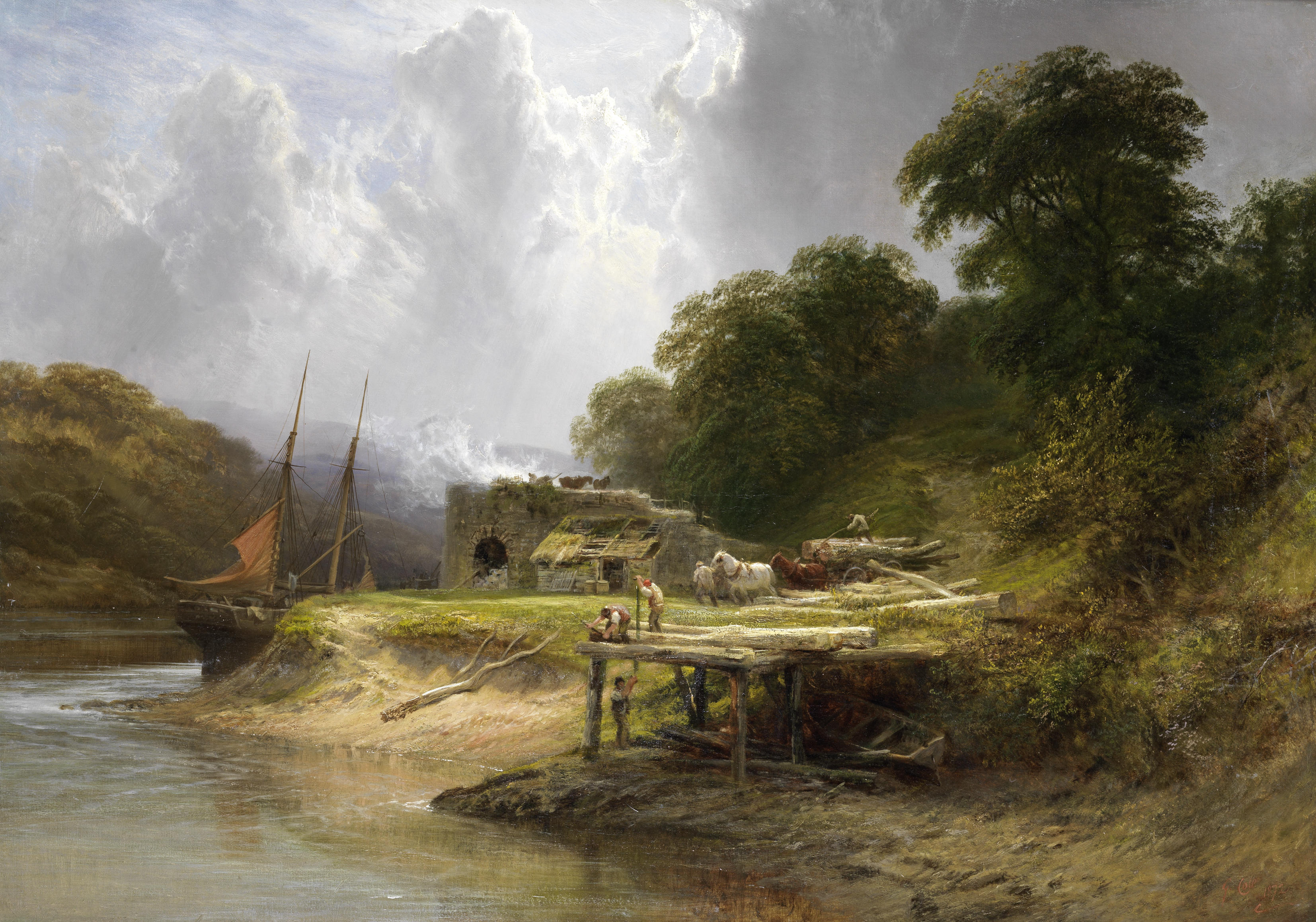
Early Morning on the Tamar (1872)

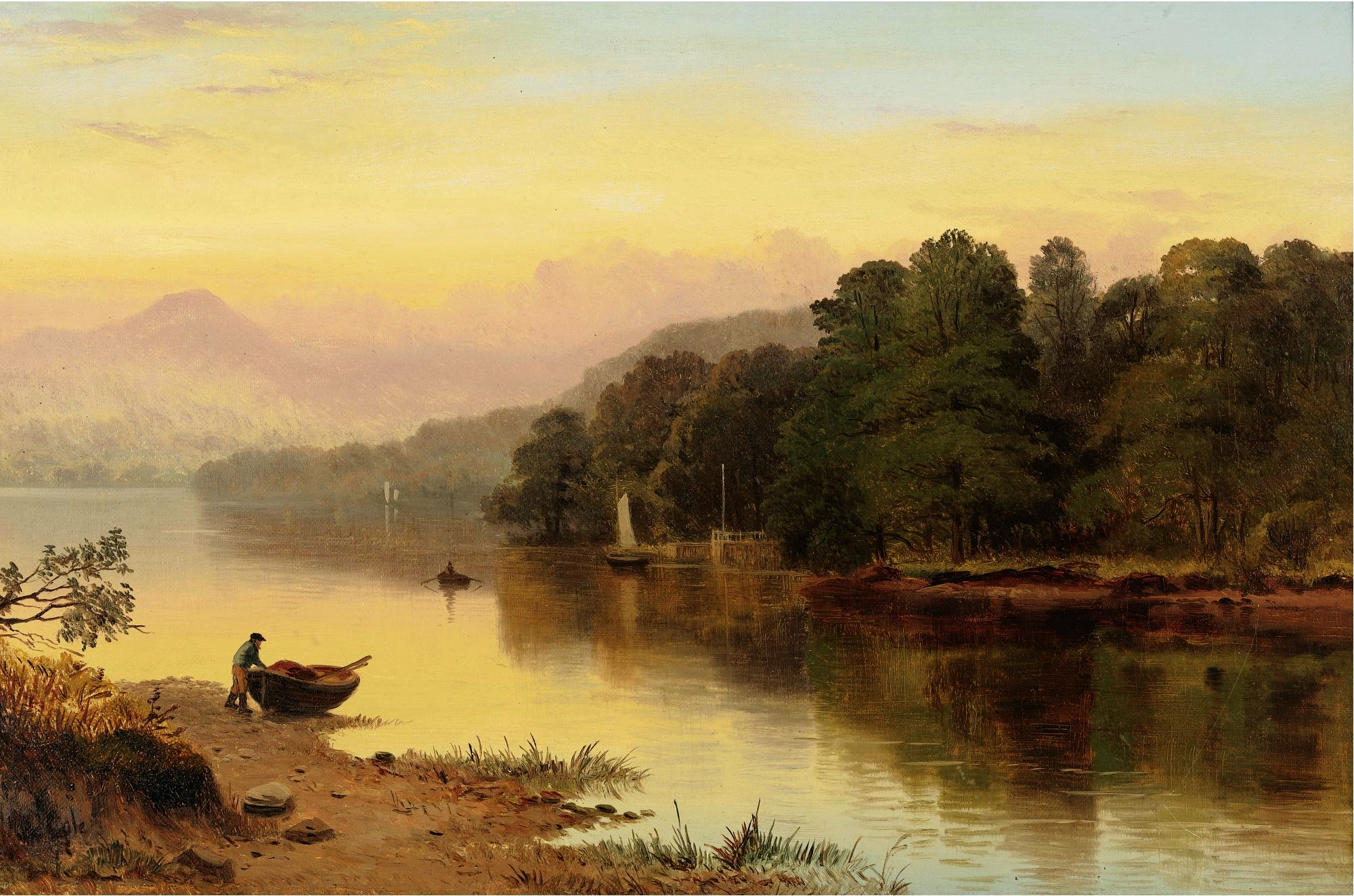
A River in Wales

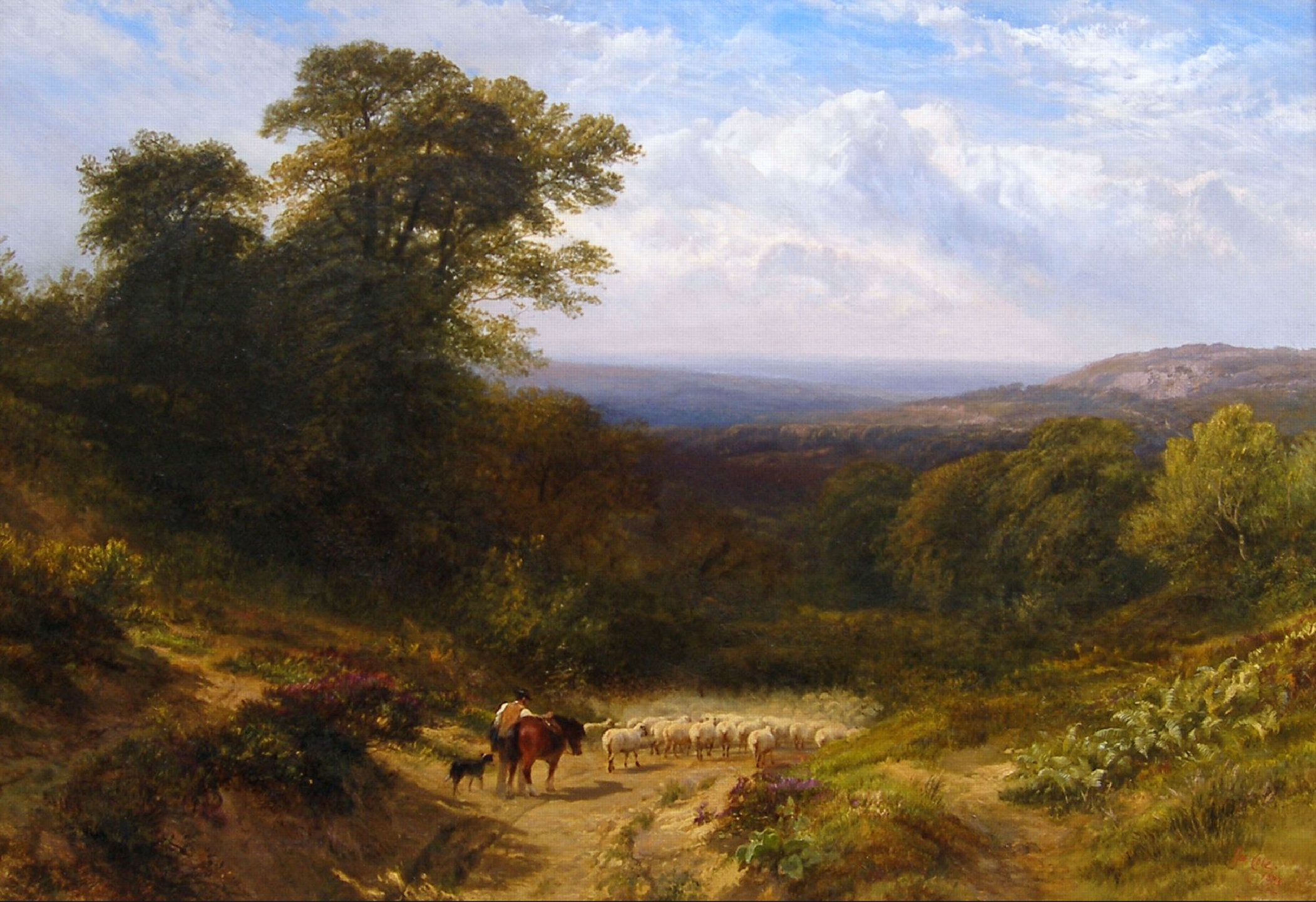
Pastoral Landscape (1873)

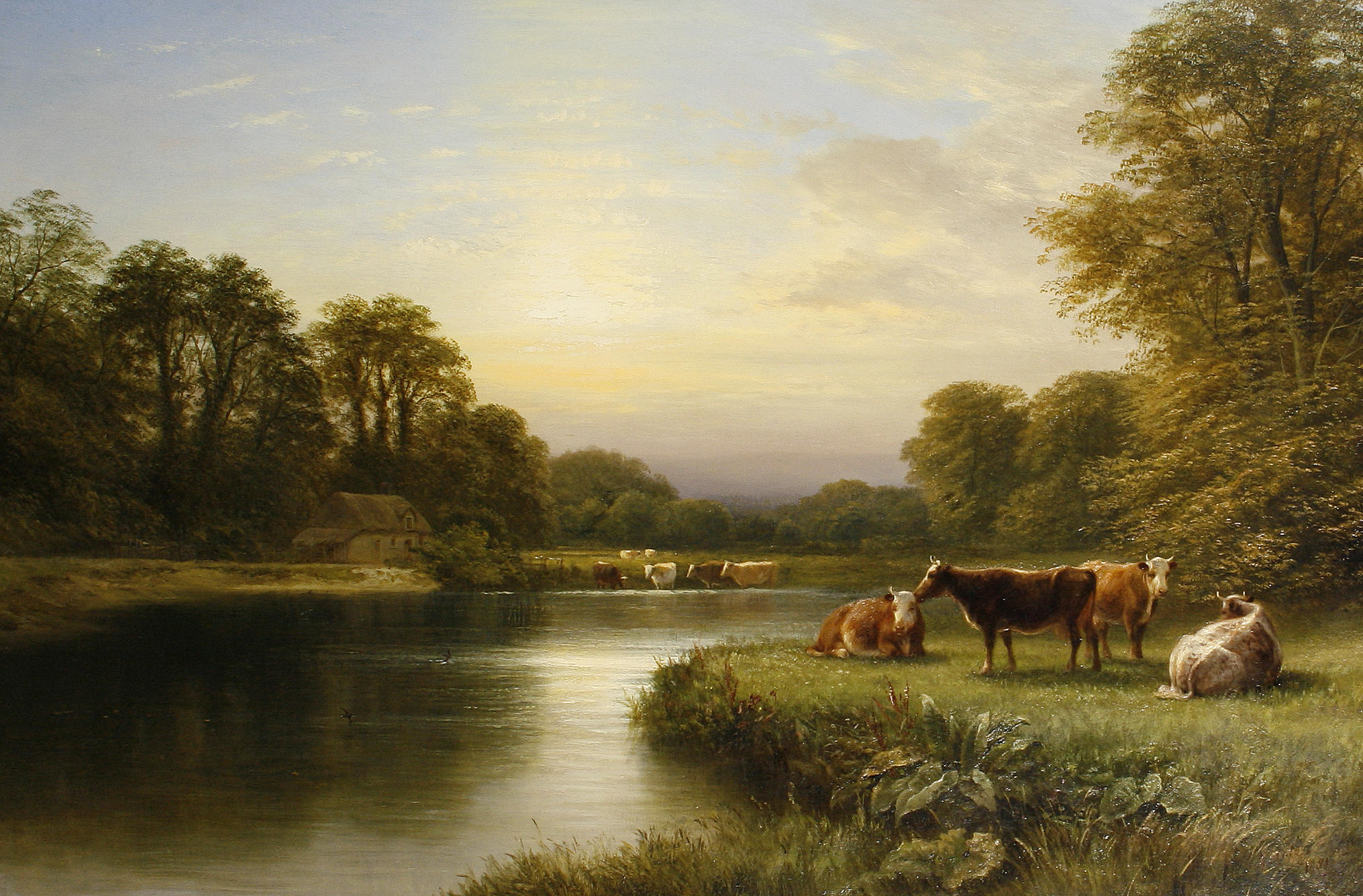
Cattle on a Riverbank
