= George Coles =

George Coles may refer to:

- George Coles (Cambridge University cricketer) (1798–1865), English amateur cricketer
- George Coles (politician) (1810–1875), Canadian politician; first Premier of Prince Edward Island
- George Coles (Kent cricketer) (1851–1903), English cricketer
- George Coles (architect) (1884–1963), English architect
- George Coles (entrepreneur) (1885–1977), founder of what was to become the Coles Group shopping empire, Australia

== See also ==
- George Cole (disambiguation)
