= Gerald Fenwick Metcalfe =

British painter

Gerald Fenwick Metcalfe (23 August 1871 – 17 October 1953) was a British portrait painter, miniaturist, illustrator and modeller. He was born at Landour, India. In 1881 he was living with his widowed mother in Walcot, Somerset. He studied at the South Kensington, St John's Wood (where he met Byam Shaw, also born in India) and Royal Academy Schools. He was working in Chelsea 1902–03 and at Albury, Surrey, 1914–25.

== Selected works ==
- Pan
- Study for the War Memorial at Albury, Surrey
- The Molson Brothers: Harold and Eric, sons of John Elsdale Molson
