= Rex Vicat Cole =

English painter

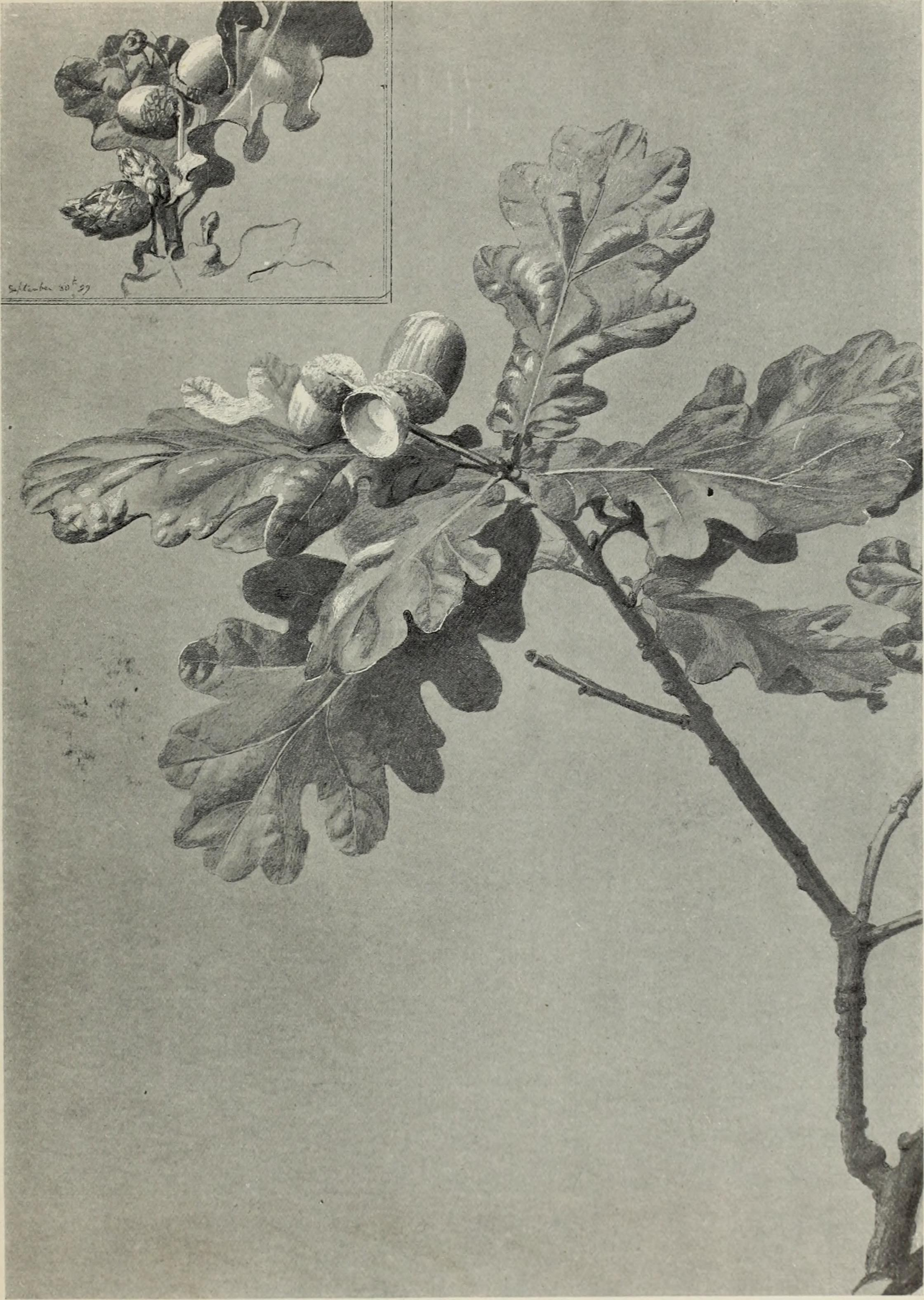
Study of oak leaves and acorns.jpg

Reginald ("Rex") George Vicat Cole (1870–1940) was an English landscape painter.

== Life ==
Vicat Cole was the son of the artist George Vicat Cole and Mary Ann Chignell. He was educated at Eton and began to exhibit in London in 1890. In 1900 he was elected a member of the Royal Society of British Artists.

His preferred subject matter was the landscape of the area surrounding Bolton Abbey in the Yorkshire Dales. In 1900, he married Hannah Gill, the daughter of a Yorkshire farmer. In 1901, an exhibition at Dowdeswell's Gallery collected his work under the title "A Year in Wharfedale". He taught at King's College London with Byam Shaw, and together they opened their own establishment, the Byam Shaw and Vicat Cole School of Art, in Camden Street, Kensington in 1910. At the outbreak of the First World War Vicat Cole and Byam Shaw enlisted in the Artists Rifles although Shaw soon transferred to the Special Constabulary. After Shaw's death in 1919 Vicat Cole was Principal until his retirement in 1926.

In 1905, Vicat Cole and his family began to rent the cottage of Brinkwells near Fittleworth in Sussex, where he found the inspiration for many of his paintings and drawings. Between 1917 and 1921, Cole sub-let the property to Edward Elgar, who composed his last major works there.

Vicat Cole was especially known for his paintings of trees, and he wrote and illustrated a book on British Trees (1907), and another on how to depict trees in art, The Artistic Anatomy of Trees, published in 1915. He also wrote a book on Perspective, and planned another on The Streets of London, which was never published, although the manuscript survives, as do over two hundred works intended as illustrations. His one-man show "London Old and New" at Robert Dunthorne's Gallery, Vigo Street, London, in 1935, included panel paintings of nearly all the City churches, and large canvases of London from Waterlow Park (now in Southampton Art Gallery), St Paul's from Bankside and St Martin-in-the-Fields. Throughout the first three decades of the twentieth century he exhibited landscapes at the Royal Academy's annual exhibitions.

He collapsed and died in 1940 in Sussex whilst helping to rescue a family whose car had become stranded in flood water. The school of art he founded became part of Central Saint Martins College of Art and Design in 2003.

Vicat Cole's son, John Cole (1903-1975), trained at the Vicat Cole and Byam Shaw School of became a landscape painter who specialized in representations of old shop-fronts. Like his father, grandfather, and great grandfather (George Cole, 1810-1883), he exhibited at the Royal Academy, and became a member of the Royal Society of British Artists.

== Sources ==
- Fitzgerald, Carol; Harvey, Brian W (2007). Elgar, Vicat Cole and the Ghosts of Brinkwells. Chichester: Phillimore & Co. ISBN 978-1-86077-442-3.
- Tim Barringer (1988). The Cole Family: Painters of the English Landscape, 1870-1940. Portsmouth City Art Gallery.
- Tim Barringer (2010). Before and After Modernism: Byam Shaw, Rex Vicat Cole, Yinka Shonibare. London: Central St Martins.
