= Isabel Codrington =

British artist (1874–1943)

- Born: Isabel Codrington Pyke-Nott; 1874; Bydown, Devon
- Died: 1943 (aged 68–69)
- Education: Royal Academy Schools
- Known for: Painting
- Spouses: P.G Konody (m. 1901–12, divorced); Gustavus Mayer

Isabel Codrington Pyke-Nott, later Isabel Konody then Isabel Mayer (1874–1943), was a British artist. She painted figures in watercolour and oils and also produced miniatures.

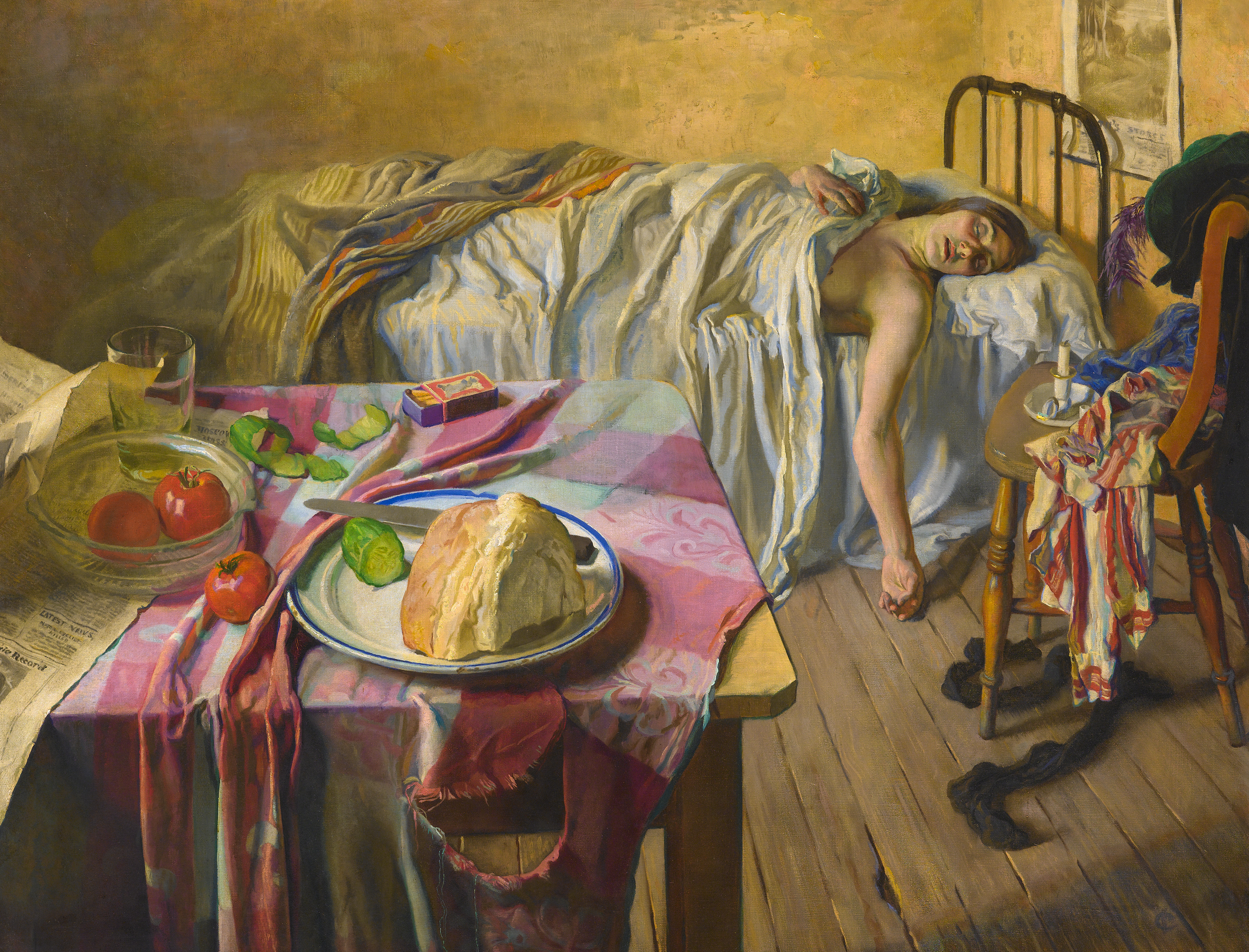
Morning - Isabel Codrington - 26 1934

== Biography ==
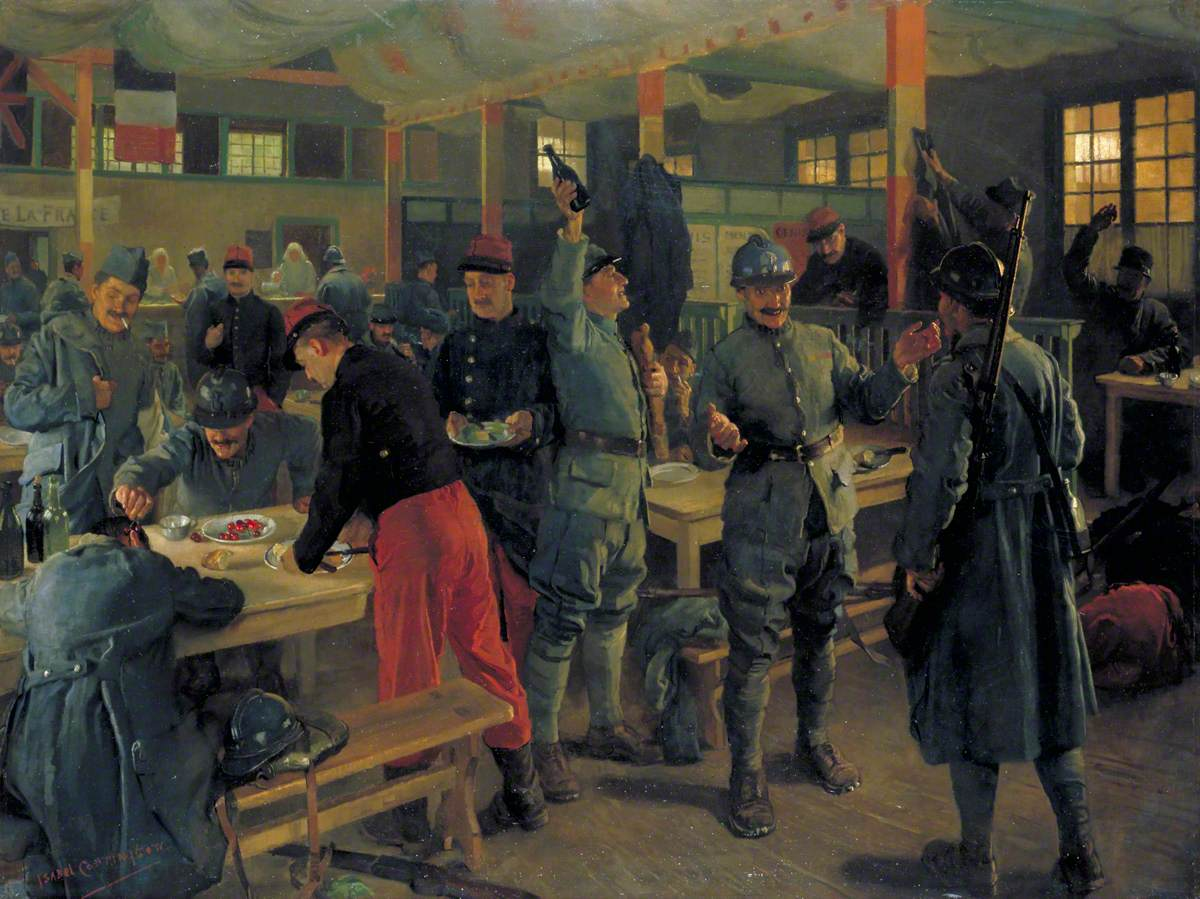
Cantine Franco-Britannique, Vitry-le-François, 1919

Codrington was born in Bydown, near Barnstaple in Devon. Her father was the local squire and an amateur playwright and her mother was a writer and painter. Aged 15, Codrington was enrolled in the Royal Academy School in London where she was awarded two medals. In October 1901 she married the art critic P.G. Konody (1872–1933), who was then the editor of an art magazine and also wrote regularly for several newspapers. The couple had two daughters during the following five years, one of whom, Pauline Konody, would also become a painter. Codrington continued to paint, and a watercolour by her won a medal at the 1907 Exposition International d'Arte in Barcelonia. The Konodys lived in London and enjoyed a social scene that featured many artists, poets and writers. In 2015 an unpublished poem written to Codrington in 1909 by Ezra Pound emerged and was sold at auction in Edinburgh. The Konodys divorced in 1912 and Codrington continued her artistic career. In due course she married Gustavus Mayer, a partner in the Bond Street art dealers Colnaghi & Co.

In 1919 the Imperial War Museum acquired a large oil painting, Cantine Franco-Britannique, Vitry-le-François, by Codrington of a World War One canteen for French troops. During the 1920s she was a regular exhibitor at the Royal Academy and the Fine Art Society in London and also had works shown in Paris, both at the Knoedler Galleries and at the Paris Salon. In 1923 a work by Codrington received an honourable mention at the Salon des Artistes Francais.

Between 1928 and 1932 Codrington was a regular exhibitor in Scotland frequently showing at the Royal Scottish Academy, the Royal Glasgow Institute of the Fine Arts and the Royal Hibernian Academy. Codrington also exhibited with the Royal West of England Academy. A solo exhibition of her flower paintings was held in 1935 and 1936 at the Rembrandt Gallery in Vigo Street in London. Manchester City Art Gallery and the Ferens Art Gallery in Hull also hold examples of her work. For most of her adult life, Codrington lived in Woldingham in Surrey.
