= George Vicat Cole =

English painter (1833–1893)

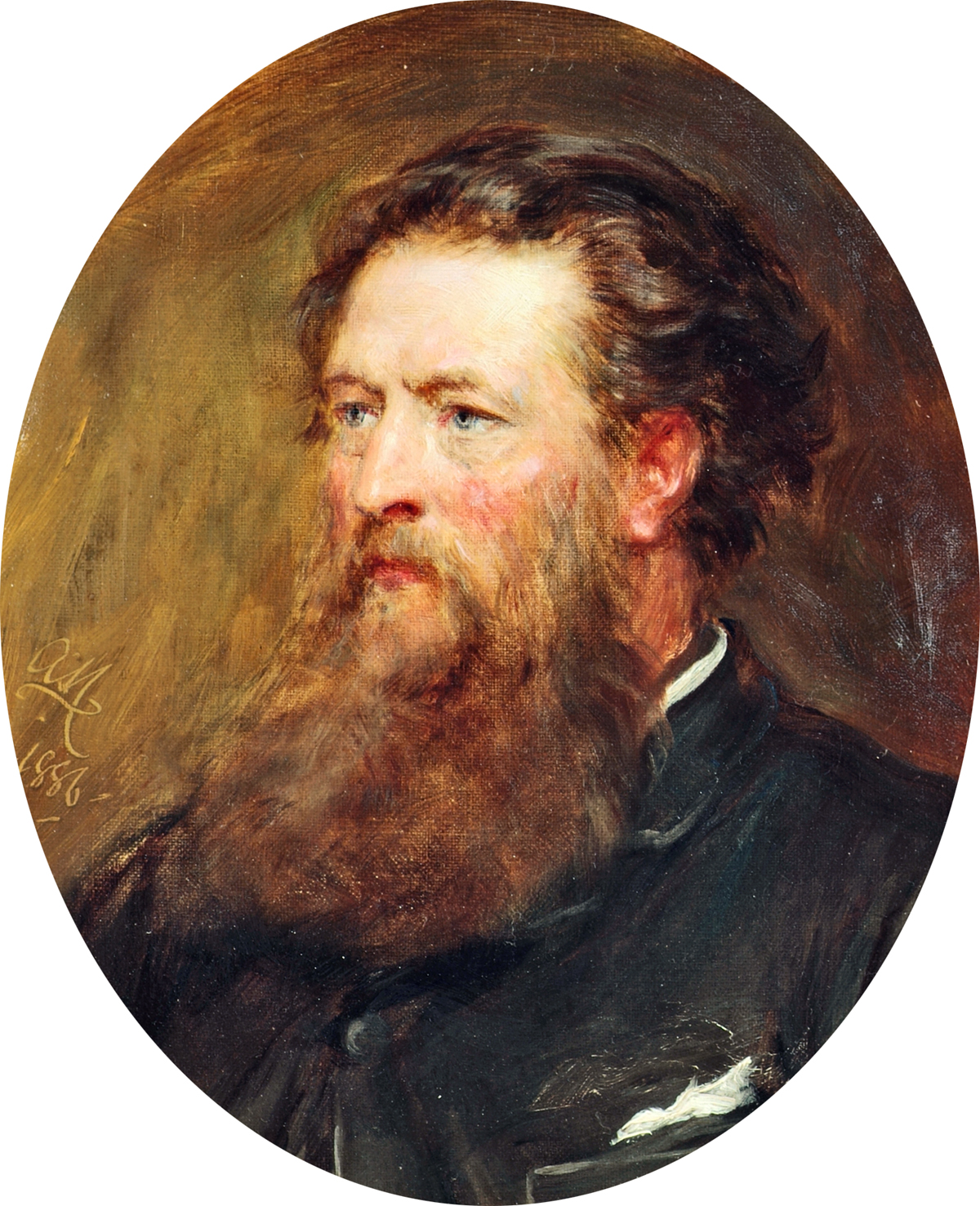
Portrait of Cole by Arthur Stockdale Cope (1886)

George Vicat Cole RA (17 April 1833 – 6 April 1893) was an English painter.

== Life ==
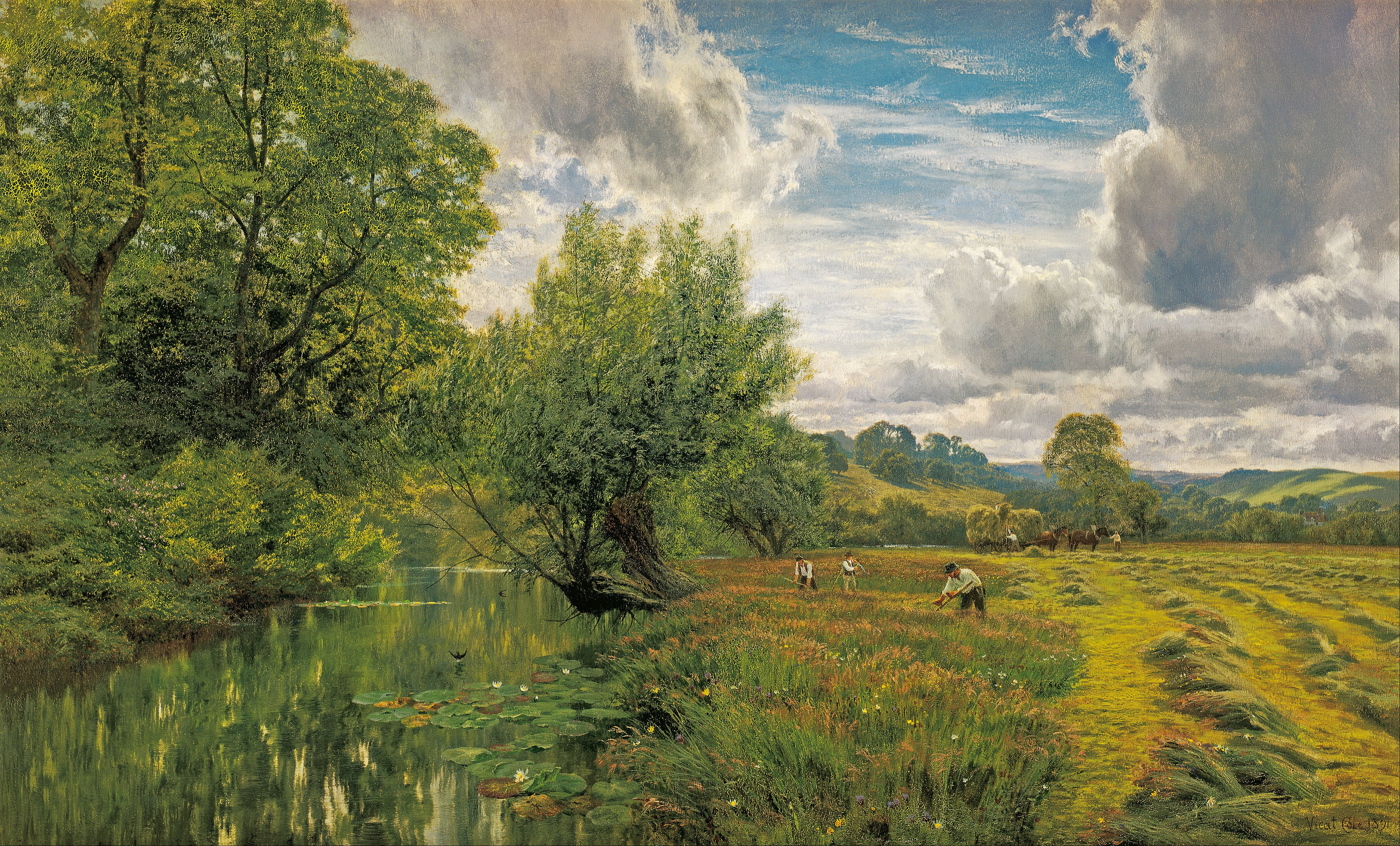
Hayfield, near Days' Lock (1891)

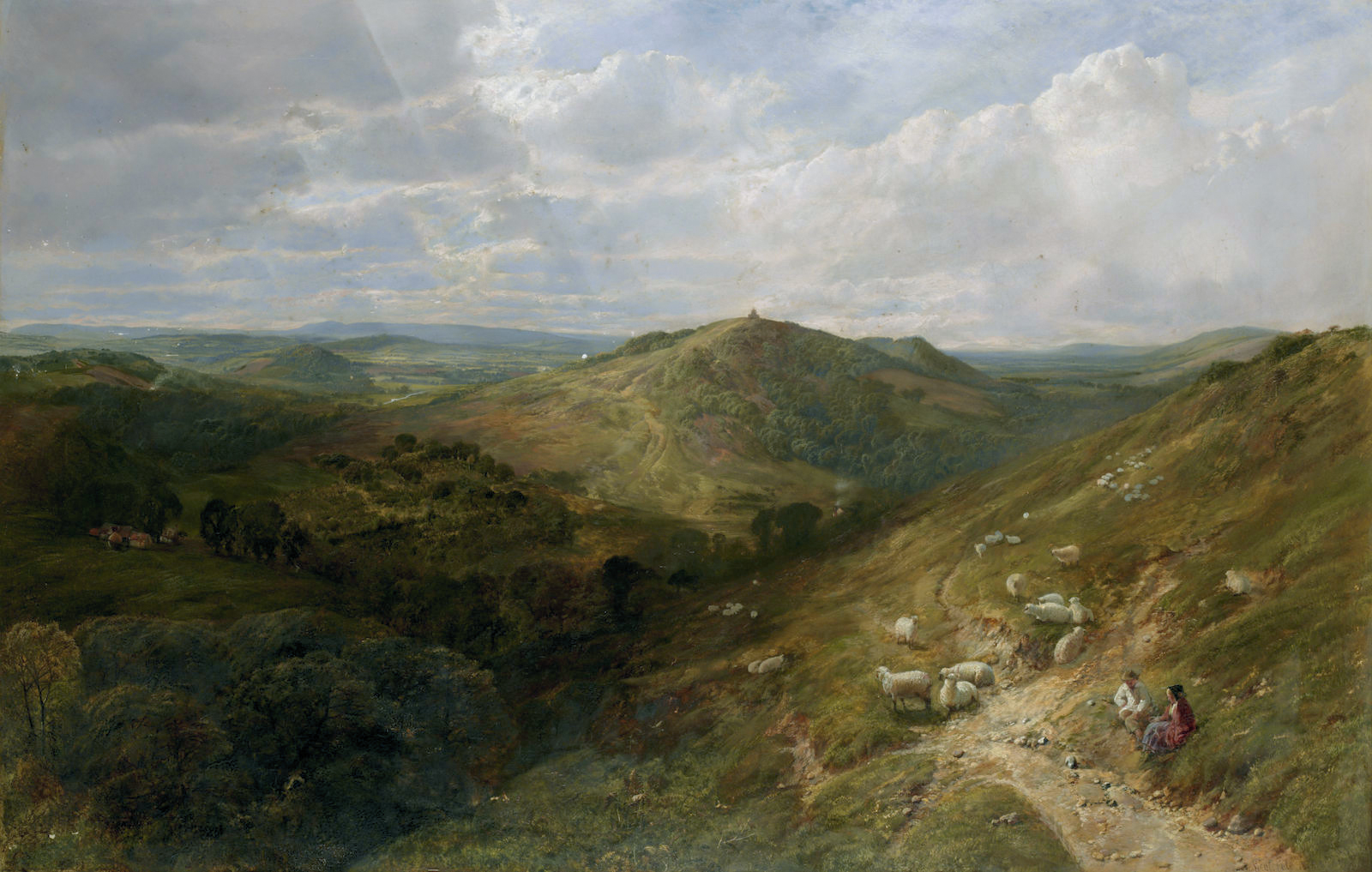
Landscape, possibly The Hog's Back, Guildford.

Cole was born at Portsmouth, the son of the landscape painter, George Cole (1810–1883), and in his practice followed his father's lead with marked success. He exhibited at the British Institution at the age of nineteen, and was first represented at the Royal Academy in 1853. His election as an associate of this institution took place in 1870, and he became an Academician ten years later. He died in London on 6 April 1893. The wide popularity of his work was due partly to the simple directness of his technical method, and partly to his habitual choice of attractive material.

Most of his subjects were found in the counties of Surrey and Sussex, and along the banks of the Thames. One of his largest pictures, The Pool of London, was bought by the Chantrey Fund Trustees in 1888, and was shown in the Tate Gallery.

He was the father of the painter Rex Vicat Cole. He may have been related to the society portraitist Philip Tennyson Cole.

His daughter Mary Blanche Cole (1858–1945), also an artist, married the artist Louis Paul (Alexander Louis Paul 1855–1927).
