= George Cole (cricketer) =

English cricketer

Personal information
- Full name: George Lamont Cole
- Born: 5 September 1885; St Leonards-on-Sea, Sussex, England
- Died: 14 October 1964 (aged 79); Boughton Street, Kent, England
- Batting: Right-handed

Domestic team information
- Years: Team
- 1908: Cambridge University
- 1909–1911: Hampshire

Career statistics
Competition	First-class
Matches	7
Runs scored	122
Batting average	11.09
100s/50s	–/–
Top score	33
Catches/stumpings	4/–
- Source: Cricinfo, 5 January 2010

George Lamont Cole (5 September 1885 — 14 October 1964) was an English cricketer and clergyman.

The son of The Reverend George Lamont Cole senior, he was born at St Leonards-on-Sea in September 1885. He was educated at Sherborne School, where he played for both the cricket and rugby elevens. From there, he matriculated to Pembroke College, Cambridge. While studying at Cambridge, he made a single appearance in first-class cricket for Cambridge University Cricket Club against Kent at Fenner's in 1908. The following season, he made one first-class appearance for Hampshire against Gloucestershire at Portsmouth. After graduating from Cambridge, he was ordained into the Church of England in 1911, and served as curate at South Farnborough prior to the First World War. His ecclesiastical duties coincided with him making further appearances for Hampshire in first-class cricket, with five appearances in the 1911 County Championship. In seven first-class matches, he scored 122 runs at an average of 11.09; his highest score of 33 came against Leicestershire in 1911.

During the First World War, Cole was a chaplain with the Royal Army Chaplains' Department on the Western Front from 1916 to 1918. He was later appointed rector at Ash in Surrey in 1925, before being appointed vicar of South Holmwood in 1930. His appointment at Holmwood lasted until 1936, when he was appointed vicar at Oatlands. Cole was later appointed an honorary canon at Guildford Cathedral in 1946. He died in October 1964 at Boughton Street, Kent.
