= Tim Barringer =

British academic

Tim Barringer is the Paul Mellon professor of the history of art at Yale University.

== Selected publications ==
- Opulence and Anxiety: Landscape Paintings from the Royal Academy. Kineton, Warwickshire: Compton Verney, 2007.
- Men at Work: Art and Labour in Victorian Britain. New Haven: Yale University Press, 2006.
- Art and the British Empire. Manchester: Manchester University Press, 2007. (edited with Geoff Quilley and Douglas Fordham)
- Art and Emancipation in Jamaica: Isaac Mendes Belisario and his Worlds. New Haven: Yale University Press, 2007. (Edited with Gillian Forrester and Barbaro Martinez-Ruiz)
- "Sonic Spectacles of Empire: The Audio-Visual Nexus, Delhi-London, 1911-12" in E. Edwards, et al., eds., Sensible Objects: Material Culture, the Senses, Colonialism, Museums. London: Berg, 2006.
