= Violet Nicolson =

English poet

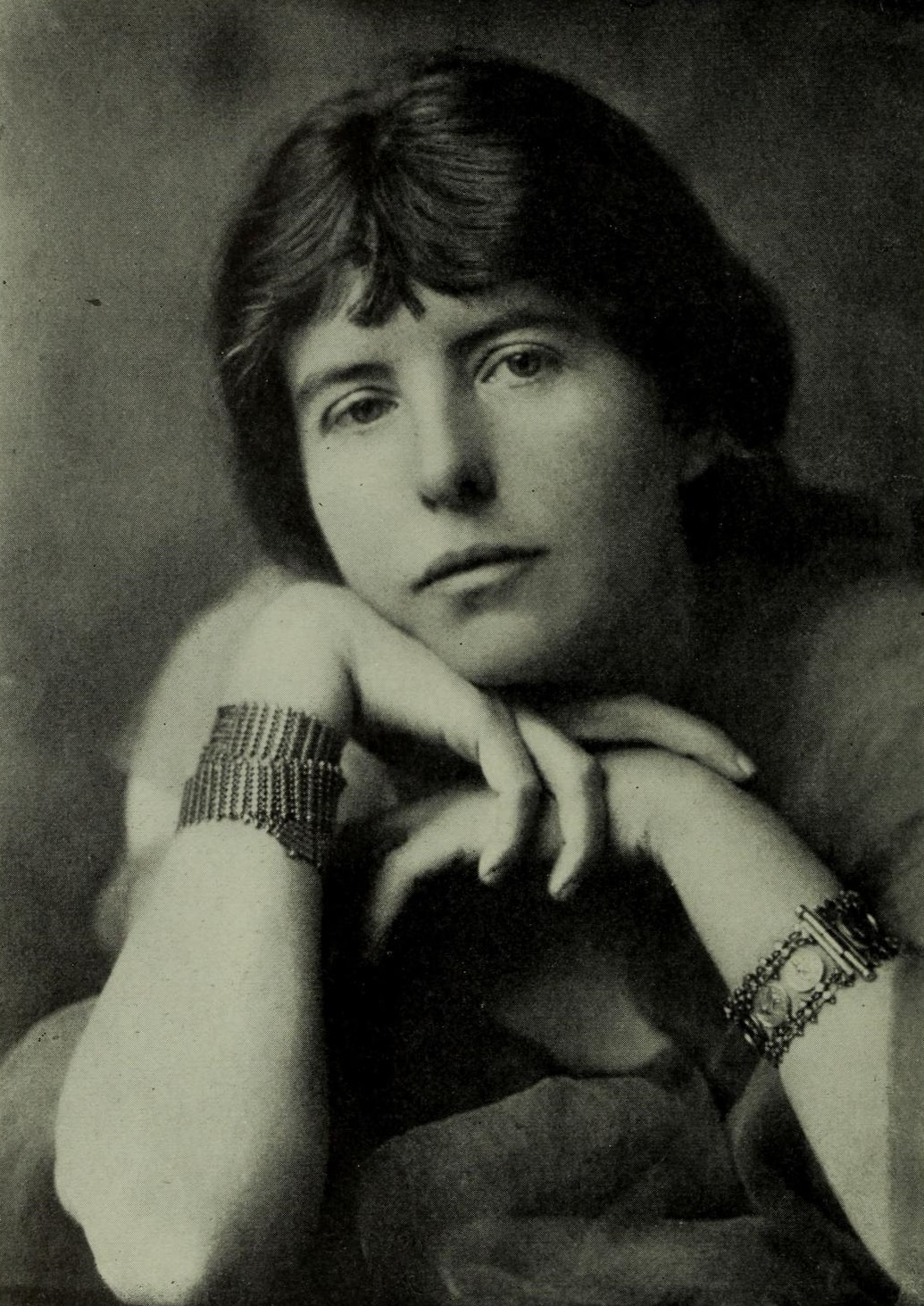
- Adela Florence Nicolson
- Born: Adela Florence Cory; 9 April 1865; Stoke Bishop, Gloucestershire, England
- Died: 4 October 1904 (aged 39); Madras, Madras Province, British India
- Resting place: St. Mary’s Cemetery, Chennai, India
- Occupation: Poet
- Spouse: Malcolm Hassels Nicolson
- Parent(s): Arthur Cory (father), Fanny Elizabeth Griffin (mother)

Violet Nicolson (9 April 1865 – 4 October 1904), otherwise known as Adela Florence Nicolson (née Cory), was an English poet who wrote under the pseudonym Laurence Hope. In the early 1900s, she became a best-selling author.

== Biography ==
She was born on 9 April 1865 at Stoke Bishop, Gloucestershire, the second of three daughters to Colonel Arthur Cory and Fanny Elizabeth Griffin. Her father was employed in the British army at Lahore, and thus she was brought up by her relatives back in England. She left for India in 1881 to join her father. Her father was editor of the Lahore arm of The Civil and Military Gazette, and it was he who in all probability gave Rudyard Kipling (a contemporary of his daughter) his first employment as a journalist. Her sisters Annie Sophie Cory and Isabel Cory also pursued writing careers: Annie wrote popular, racy novels under the pseudonym "Victoria Cross," while Isabel assisted and then succeeded their father as editor of the Sind Gazette.

Adela married Colonel Malcolm Hassels Nicolson, who was then twice her age and commandant of the 3rd Battalion, the Baluch Regiment in April 1889. He had apparently gained a reputation for derring do, once crossing the Mango Pir River by hopping from one crocodile's back to another. A talented linguist, he introduced her to his love of India and native customs and food, which she began to share. This widely gave the couple a reputation for being eccentric. On the Zhob Valley expedition of 1890 she followed her husband through the passes of the Afghan border disguised as a Pathan boy. They lived in Mhow from 1895 until early 1900. After he died in a prostate operation, Adela, who had been prone to depression since childhood, committed suicide by poisoning herself and died at the age of 39 on 4 October 1904 in Madras. Her son Malcolm published her Selected Poems posthumously in 1922.

== Writing ==
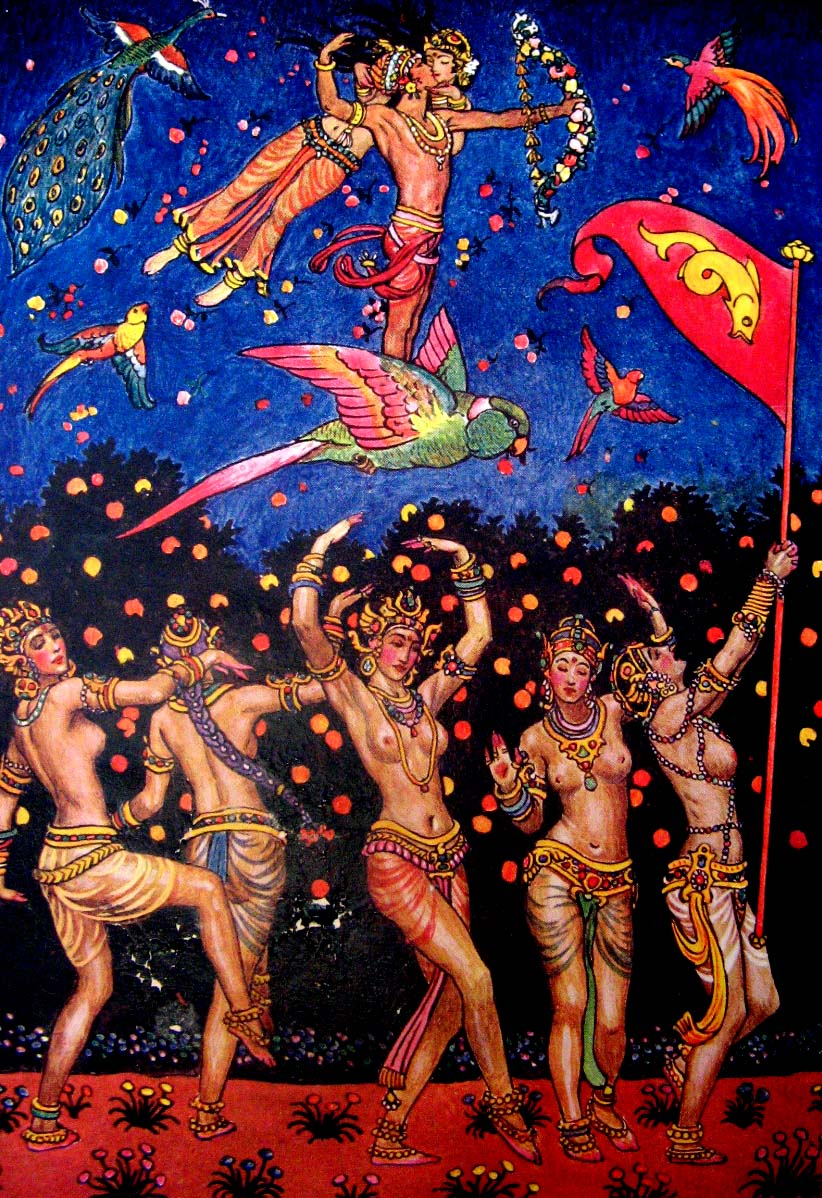
One of Byam Shaw's illustrations for the 1914 deluxe edition of The Garden of Kama

In 1901, she published Garden of Kama, which was published a year later in America under the title India's Love Lyrics. She attempted to pass these off as translations of various poets, but this claim soon fell under suspicion. Her poems often used imagery and symbols from the poets of the North-West Frontier of India and the Sufi poets of Persia. She was among the most popular romantic poets of the Edwardian era. Her poems are typically about unrequited love and loss and often, the death that followed such an unhappy state of affairs. Many of them have an air of autobiography or confession.

Details on her life are not easy to find due to her relative lack of letters, but Lesley Blanch, in her book Under a Lilac-Bleeding Star, included some biographical information that drew on unpublished memoirs written by her son. In Diaries and Letters from India, Violet Jacob provided some information about the Nicolsons and their milieu, although most of what is known of Violet, as she came to be known, had to be gleaned through her poetry. Despite Nicolson's use of pseudonyms and fictionalised characters, it was apparent to some of her contemporaries that her poems were deeply personal, even confessional. The "Dedication to Malcom Nicolson" that prefaces her last collection, written shortly before her suicide, provides an ambiguous disclaimer regarding the autobiographical origins of her poetry:

I, who of lighter love wrote many a verse,
Made public never words inspired by thee,
Lest strangers' lips should carelessly rehearse
Things that were sacred and too dear to me.

Thy soul was noble; through these fifteen years
Mine eyes familiar, found no fleck nor flaw,
Stern to thyself, thy comrades' faults and fears
Proved generosity thine only law.

Small joy was I to thee; before we met
Sorrow had left thee all too sad to save.
Useless my love—as vain as this regret
That pours my hopeless life across thy grave.

== Popular culture adaptations ==
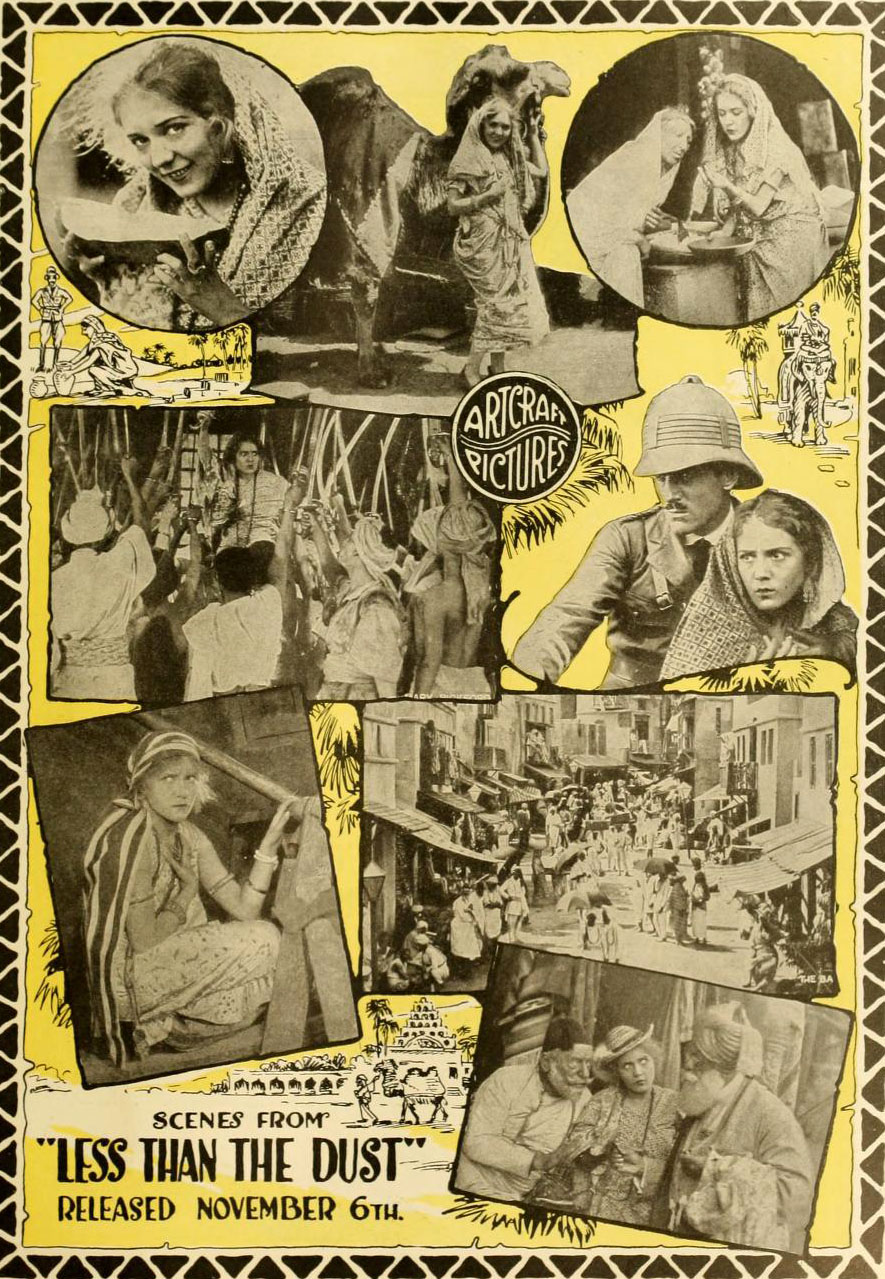
Advertisement for Pickford's film

- The life and poetry of Adela Nicolson have inspired a wide range of adaptations, beginning with British composer Amy Woodforde-Finden's musical settings of four of the lyrics from The Garden of Kama to music. The most popular of these was Kashmiri Song. After the songs proved a critical success, Woodforde-Finden added four settings of lyrics from Nicolson's 1903 book Stars of the Desert. African-American composer Harry Burleigh published Five Songs of Laurence Hope in 1915. African-American composer Marques L.A. Garrett adapted Burleigh's compositions for mixed choir in 2020.
- The Mary Pickford film Less Than the Dust (1916) was ostensibly inspired by the poem and song of the same title. Stoll Pictures released a film entitled The Indian Love Lyrics in 1923.
- Fictional literary works based on Nicolson's life or poetry include Somerset Maugham's The Colonel's Lady (Creatures of Circumstance, 1947). This was also adapted into a segment of the film Quartet (1948). Later fictional works include Mary Talbot Cross's Fate Knows no Tears (1996) and Tim Orchard's That Bloody Female Poet (a book before Google) (2011).
- In the 1910s and 1920s, dances based on The Garden of Kama were created and performed by Ruth St. Denis and Ted Shawn, Martha Graham and Michio Ito.
