= Amy Woodforde-Finden =

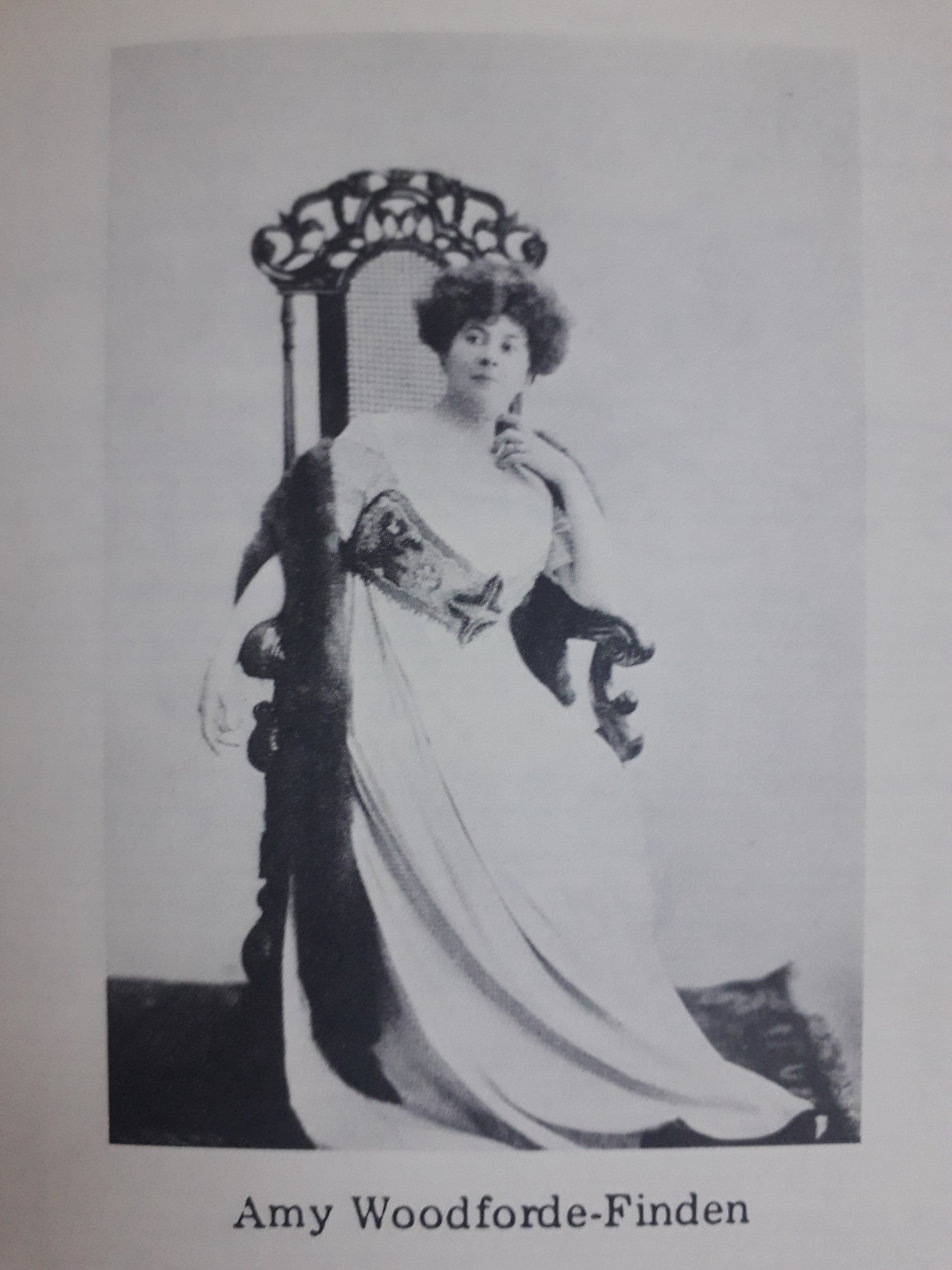
Amy Woodforde-Finden

Amy Woodforde-Finden (1860 – 13 March 1919) was a composer who is best known for writing the music to "Kashmiri Song" from Four Indian Love Lyrics by Laurence Hope.

== Biography ==
Amy Woodforde-Finden was born Amelia Rowe Ward in 1860 at Valparaíso, Chile, the youngest daughter of American parents, Alfred and Virginia Worthington Heath Ward. Alfred served as a US Consul after being recommended by Balie Peyton, US Ambassador to Chile under President Zachary Taylor. Her father died in 1867 and her mother moved the family to London, where Virginia became a naturalized British citizen in 1873. Around that time Amy displayed a skill for composition and became a student of Carl Schloesser and Amy Horrocks. Her early work, published as Amy Ward, though promising, was received only tepidly.

At the age of 34, she married Brigade-Surgeon Woodforde-Finden, who served during the Second Afghan War and Third Burmese War with the Bengal establishment of the Indian Medical Service; they lived in India for several years, and during her time there she wrote and published what would become her most famous pieces: Kashmiri Song (1902) and A Lover in Damascus (six songs, 1904, text Charles Hanson Towne). Kashmiri Song was originally self-published but because of its popularity and the influence of Hamilton Earle, it was eventually published by Boosey & Co. The popularity of these pieces kept her in the good graces of her publishing house and her audience.

Her songs are noted for their sentimentality, their romantic fluidity and how they blend a particularly British, middle-class sensibility with an Asian pastiche. In the years that followed the success of Kashmiri Song, she composed On Jhelum River (1906 six song cycle, text Frederick John Fraser), The Pagoda of Flowers (1907, a one act lyric opera, text Fraser), A Dream of Egypt (1910 six song cycle, text Towne), Stars of the Desert (1911, four songs, text Hope) and her last, The Myrtles of Damascus (1918, five song cycle, text Towne).

The year 1916 was a bitter-sweet one for Woodforde-Finden: she lost her husband in April, and her work was featured in the film Less Than the Dust. This was just the first of her work to be showcased in film. In 1943, Kashmiri Song would be used in the film Hers To Hold. She moved back to London after she lost her husband, and survived him by only three years, dying on 13 March 1919. It is said that she died composing at the piano. Amy is buried in Hampsthwaite churchyard in North Yorkshire, and her memorial is a recumbent figure in white marble.

== Legacy ==
Amy Woodforde-Finden's music was part of a wider vogue for "exotic" orientalism in both classical and popular music in the 19th and early twentieth century. These Western approximations of Chinese, Japanese and Indian music were later deconstructed by the post-colonial criticism of Edward Said and others. According to Gerry Farrell:

The India of the romantic imagination is a place where actions take place that would be unthinkable back in middle England....this dangerous but appealing cultural ambience was just the thing to send girdled hearts racing within the safety of a parlour song.

Her obituarist in The Times pointed out that she was "'a composer of one type of song and nothing else", but admitted to 'the easy flow of melody and some workmanship". The baritone Michael Halliwell has pointed out that although her ballads have long since fallen from favour "they contain plenty of honest sentiment, good tunes and splashes of local colour — and their hints of inter-racial love and lesbian romance must have given a real frisson to their contemporary audiences".

In 2022, the German composer and pianist Thomas Flessenkaemper founded the Amy Woodforde-Finden Music Festival at St Thomas à Becket Church in Hampsthwaite.

== Recordings ==
Kashmiri Song and, to a lesser extent, Till I wake have been frequently recorded, including by tenor Richard Tauber with Percy Kahn at the piano. A Request was recorded in 1926 by Walter Widdop and Percy Kahn. Two complete sets of the Four Indian Love Lyrics were made by the English tenor Frank Titterton; and three by the Australian bass-baritone Peter Dawson, in 1923, 1925 and 1932.

There is a modern recording of Kashmiri Song by Trevor Alexander and Peter Crockford. Michael Halliwell and David Miller have recorded the complete oriental song-cycles: Four Indian Love Lyrics, A Lover in Damascus, Six Songs from On Jhelum River, A Dream of Egypt, Stars in the Desert, and The Myrtles of Damascus.

== See also ==
- Orientalism
- Music of India
