= Tuba (disambiguation) =

A tuba is a musical instrument that plays notes in the bass clef.

Tuba can also refer to:

== Instruments ==
- Roman tuba, a straight trumpet of ancient Rome
- Tuba curva, a revival of the Roman cornu
- Wagner tuba, an instrument like the tuba curva (cornu)

== Places ==
- Tuba (river), a tributary of the Yenisey in Siberia, Russia
- Tuba, Benguet, a municipality in the Philippines
- Tuba, Iran, a village in Qazvin Province, Iran
- A Palestinian village east of At-Tuwani, in the South Hebron Hills
- An ancient Middle Eastern city, the contemporary Umm el-Marra
- Tuba City, Arizona, a city in the United States named after Chief Tuba
- Tubas (city), a Palestinian city in the northern West Bank
- Tuba-Zangariyye, an Arab Beduin community in Eastern Galilee

== TUBA ==
- The International Tuba Euphonium Association, previously known as Tubists Universal Brotherhood Association (TUBA)
- Trans-umbilical breast augmentation, a plastic surgical procedure
- Türkiye Bilimler Akademisi (TÜBA), the Turkish Academy of Sciences
- TCP and UDP with Bigger Addresses, a proposed replacement for Internet Protocol v4

== Other uses ==
- Tubâ, Filipino palm wine, also found in Mexico, Guam, the Marianas, and Australia
- Tuba (given name), also spelt Tooba, or Tuğba in Turkish
- Ṭūbā (tree), a tree that Muslims believe grows in heaven
- Tuba Dei, the largest medieval bell in Poland, in the tower of the Cathedral in Toruń
- Tuba mirum, a mass liturgy
- Tuba Records, a Scandinavian music distributor and owner of Tabu Recordings
- Chief Tuba (c. 1810–1887), leader of the Hopi nation
- Cumulonimbus tuba, a column of cloud that may develop into a funnel cloud
- An alternate name for the Bidayat, an ethnic group in the Sudan and Chad
- The singular name that the Tubalars apply to themselves
- The Indonesian word for the plant Derris elliptica

== See also ==
- Touba (disambiguation)
- Tubatuba, the Filipino word for Jatropha curcas
