= Tomb of Lal Khan =

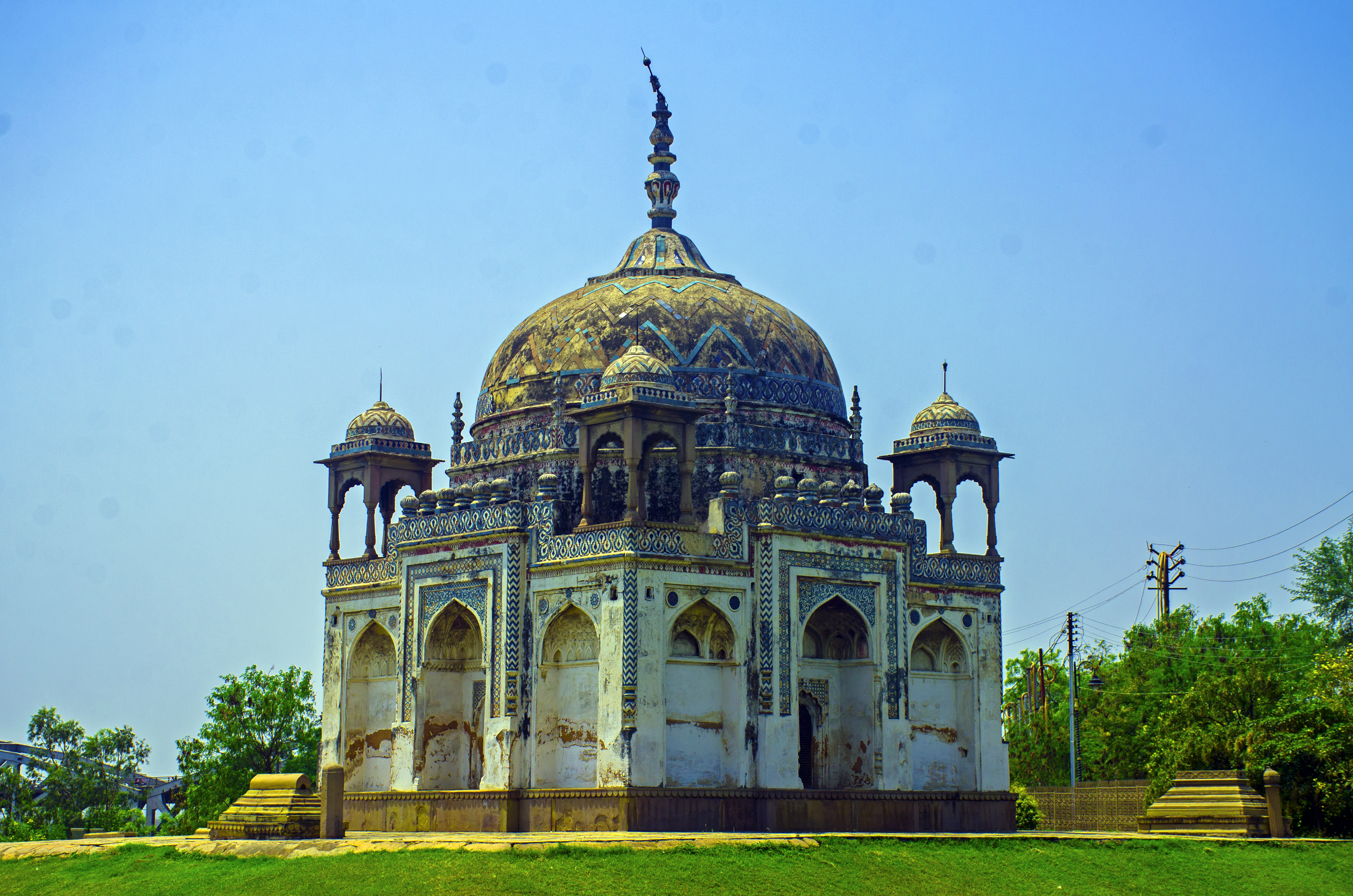

General information
- Type: mausoleum
- Location: Varanasi, Varanasi district, Uttar Pradesh, India
- Coordinates: 25°19′34″N 83°02′04″E

The Tomb of Lal Khan is a mausoleum built by ruler of Banaras State Kashi Naresh Maharaja Balwant Singh located in Varanasi, in the Indian state of Uttar Pradesh. He was a military commander of artillery of Kashi Naresh Maharaja Balwant Singh It is listed as a monument of national importance.

== History ==
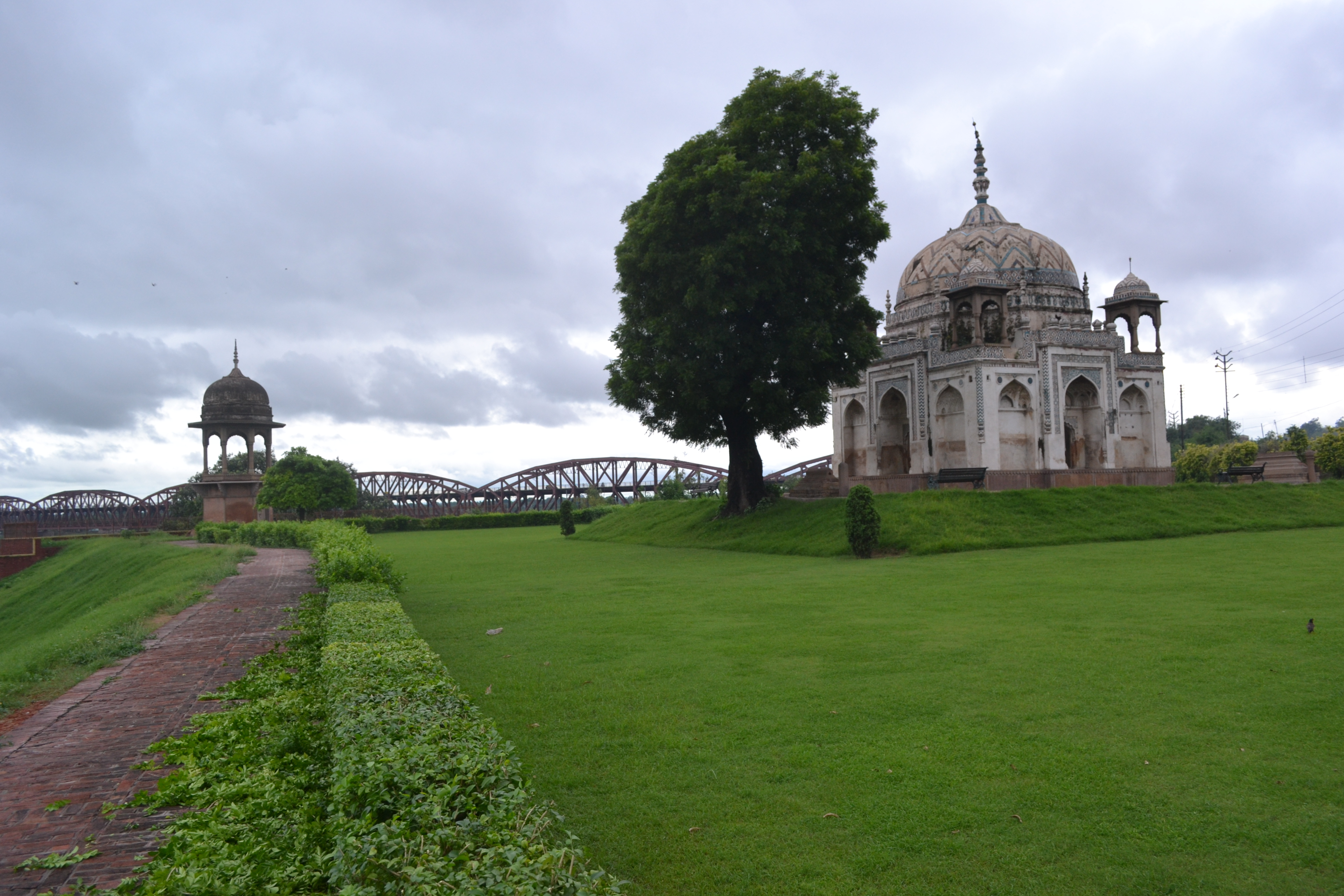
Tomb of Lal Khan with Malyiva Bridge in the background

Lal Khan was a minister in the service of Kashi Naresh Maharaja Balwant Singh. The tomb was built in 1773. Lal khan was a military commander specially of Artillery of ruler of Banaras State Kashi Naresh Maharaja Balwant Singh. Kashi Naresh Maharaja Balwant Singh had conquered Chunar Fort, Naugarh, Latif, Agori, Palita, Gazipur , Ballia, Vijaygarh, Chausa and Buxar forts with the help of artillery of Lal Khan. Lal khan was a Afghan soldier of Mughal Empire. After the ending of Mughal Empire he had joined the military of Kashi Naresh Maharaja Balwant Singh. He served in military of Kashi Naresh till his life. After his death, Kashi Naresh had built a Makabra for him.

== Description ==
It is situated in the middle of a charbagh-style garden, which had chhatris on all four corners.

The tomb is an example of Indo-Islamic architecture. is a square structure located on a square plinth. It is surmounted by a single large dome, with chhatris on four corners. Each side has three arches, with the central arch being slightly larger than the other two. The tomb is decorated with coloured tiles.
