= Tubba =

Tubba may refer to:

- Tubba, a character in the video game Drawn to Life
- Tubba', an honorific title ascribed to the rulers of Saba and Himyar. See also Qawm Tubba' for a narrative of such rulers in the Quran

== See also ==
- Tuba (disambiguation)
