= Paradise garden =

Form of garden of Old Iranian origin

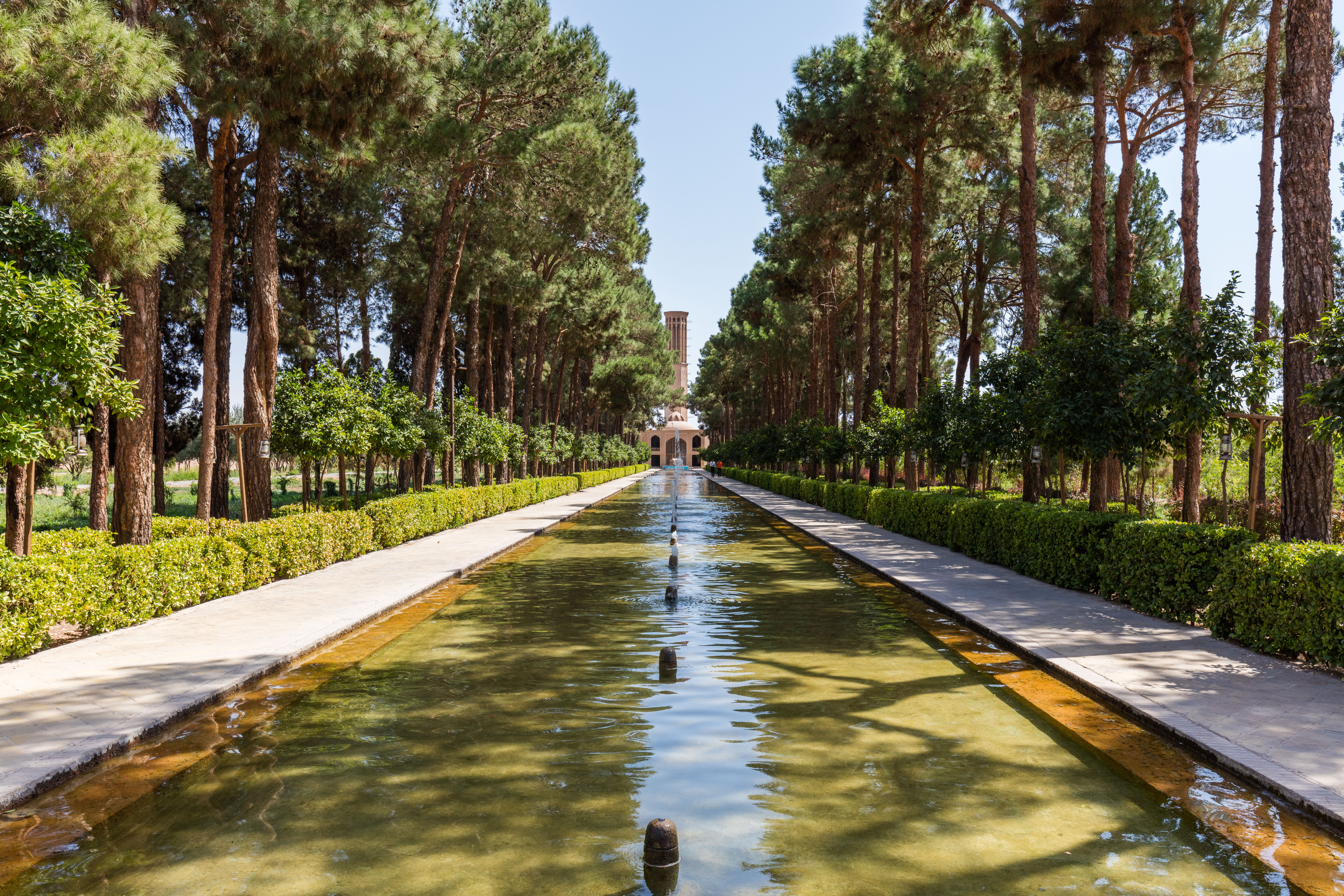
Dowlatabad Garden in Yazd, Iran

The paradise garden (Persian: باغ پردیس, romanized: Bagh-e Pardis) is a form of garden of Old Iranian origin, specifically Achaemenid, which is formal, symmetrical and, most often, enclosed. The most traditional form is a rectangular garden split into four quarters with a pond in the center, a four-fold design called chahar bagh (“four gardens”). One of the most important elements of paradise gardens is water, with ponds, canals, rills, and fountains all being common features. Scent is an essential element with fruit-bearing trees and flowers selected for their fragrance.

It is also often referred to as an Islamic garden. This form of garden design spread throughout Egypt and the Mediterranean during the Muslim Arabic conquests, reaching as far as India and Spain.

== Etymology ==
Originally denominated by a single noun denoting "a walled-in compound or garden", from "pairi" ("around") and "daeza" or "diz" ("wall", "brick", or "shape"), philosopher and historian Xenophon of Athens borrowed the Old Iranian *paridaiza(h), Late Old Iranian *pardēz (Avestan pairidaēza, Old Persian *paridaida, Late Old Persian pardēd) into Greek as paradeisos. This term is used for the Garden of Eden in Greek translations of the Old Testament.

In Hebrew the word pardes (פרדס) means 'orchard', likely borrowed from Old Iranian. The word appears in the Bible several times, including in the Song of Songs, chapter 4, verse 13: "Your orchard is a pomegranate with its fruit, acacias with nard," as well as in Ecclesiastes , chapter 2, verse 5, and Nehemiah , chapter 2, verse 8.

In Persian, the word pardis means both paradise and garden.

== History ==
The oldest Persian garden of which there are records belonged to Cyrus the Great, in his capital at Pasargadae in the province of Fars to the north of Shiraz. It is the oldest intact layout that suggests elements of the paradise garden. Likely planted with cypress, pomegranate and cherry, the garden had a geometrical plan and stone watercourses. These watercourses formed the principal axis and secondary axes of the main garden at Pasargadae, prefiguring the four-fold design of the chahar bagh. In the Achaemenid Empire, gardens contained fruit trees and flowers, including the lily and rose. In 330 BC, Alexander the Great saw the tomb of Cyrus the Great and recorded that it stood in an irrigated grove of trees.

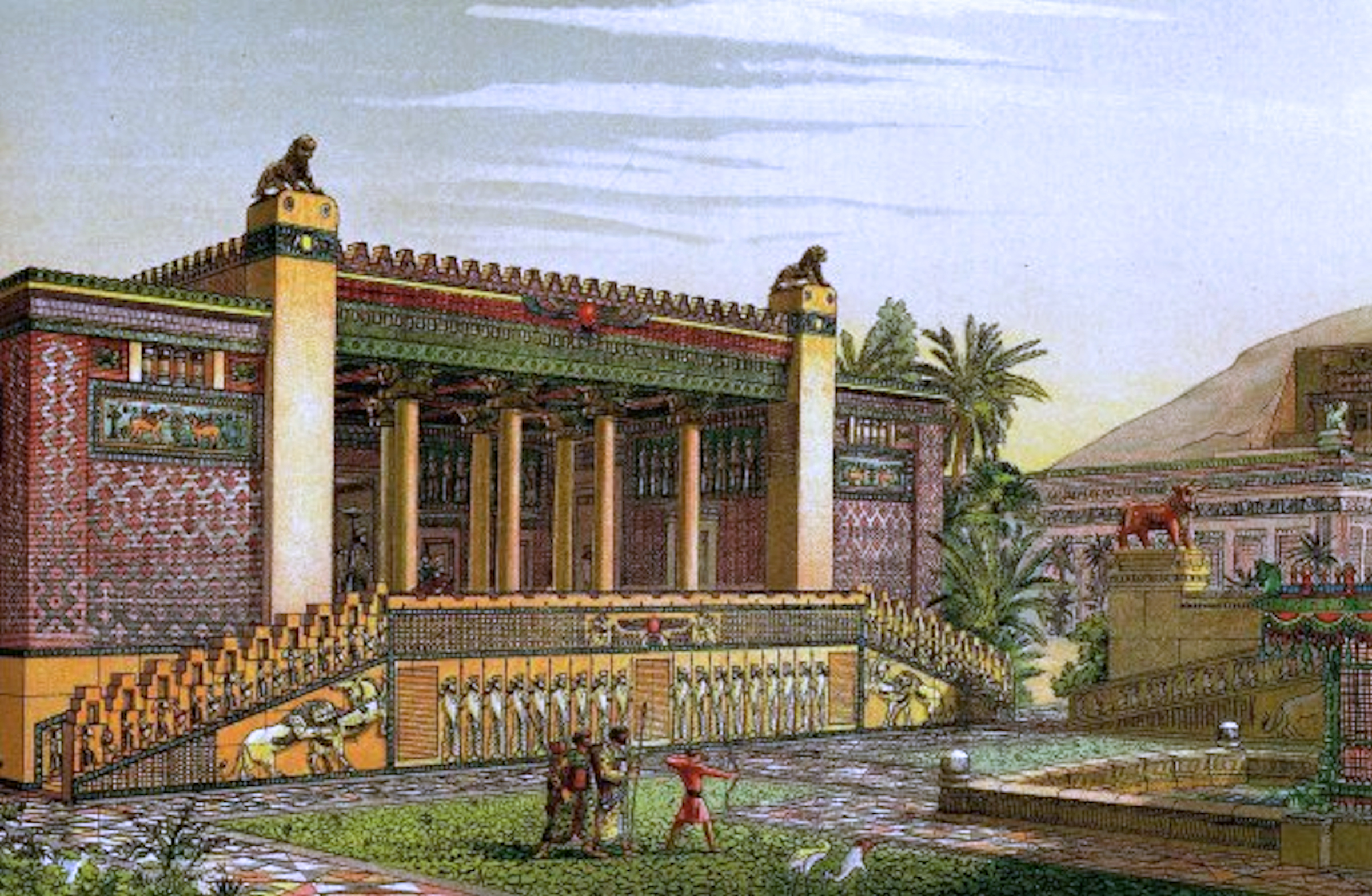
Gardens outside of the Palace of Darius I of Persia in Persepolis, an example of Achaemenid paradise gardens

It is believed that the Achaemenid kings built paradise gardens within enclosed royal hunting parks, a tradition inherited from the Assyrians, for whom the ritual lion hunt was a rite that authenticated kingship. The Assyrians in turn had inherited their landscaping techniques from the Babylonians.

In the 5th century, at the time of the invasion of Persia by Cyrus the Younger, Xenophon described a complex of palaces and pavilions belonging to Artaxerxes. This included gardens watered by an aqueduct – the earliest known record of gravity-fed water rills and basins arranged in a geometric system. The Spartan General Lysander who joined Cyrus as a mercenary reported to Xenophon how Persian kings "excelled in not only in war but also in gardening, creating paradeisos" where they collected plants, especially fruit-bearing trees and animals encountered during foreign campaigns.

The four-fold layout was later reinterpreted in Islamic terms by Muslim Arabs after the 7th-century conquest of Persia, becoming associated with the Abrahamic concept of paradise and the Garden of Eden. Genesis 2:10 reads, "And a river went out of Eden to water the garden; and from thence it was parted, and became into four heads." and Muhammad spoke of four rivers: of water, milk, wine and honey.

By the 13th century the gardens had spread with Islam throughout Egypt, Mediterranean north Africa and into Spain. This style of garden came into India during the 16th century in the reign of Prince Babur, the first Emperor of the Mughal Empire. Most Mughal gardens came to have a tomb or pavilion in the centre, the most famous of which is the Taj Mahal although with the decline of the Mughal Empire and British colonial rule, the original garden has been substantially changed.

== Features ==
The essential plan of a paradise garden is a four-fold layout (charbagh) with a pond or fountain in the centre. Later designs incorporated a pavilion or mausoleum when they began to develop into elaborate status symbols. The rectangular or rectilinear design is typically quartered by water channels made using the ancient qanat system.

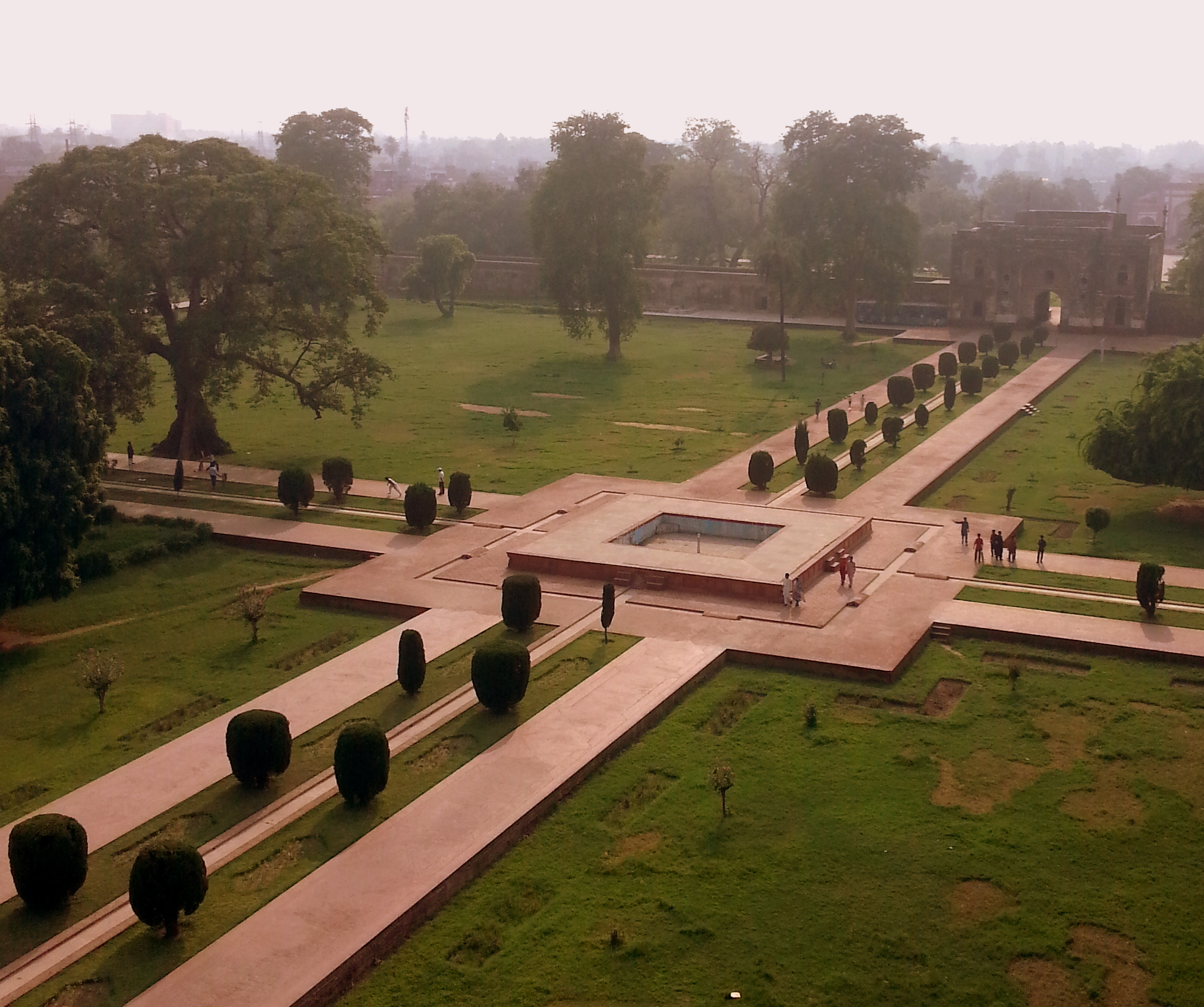
Layout of the Charbagh at the Tomb of Jahangir in Lahore

An important and common feature is the elaborate use of water, often in canals, ponds, or rills, sometimes in fountains, and less often in waterfalls. This created the soothing sound of running water and also had the practical purpose of cooling the air.

Aromatic flowers and fruit-bearing trees are quintessential elements. The ground where the flora were planted was sunken or the walkways raised so that passers-by would be able to easily pluck fresh fruit as they walked throughout the garden. Olive, fig, date and pomegranate were ubiquitous and symbolically important. Orange trees arrived from India via the Silk Road by the 11th century and were incorporated for their fragrance and the beauty of their flowers.

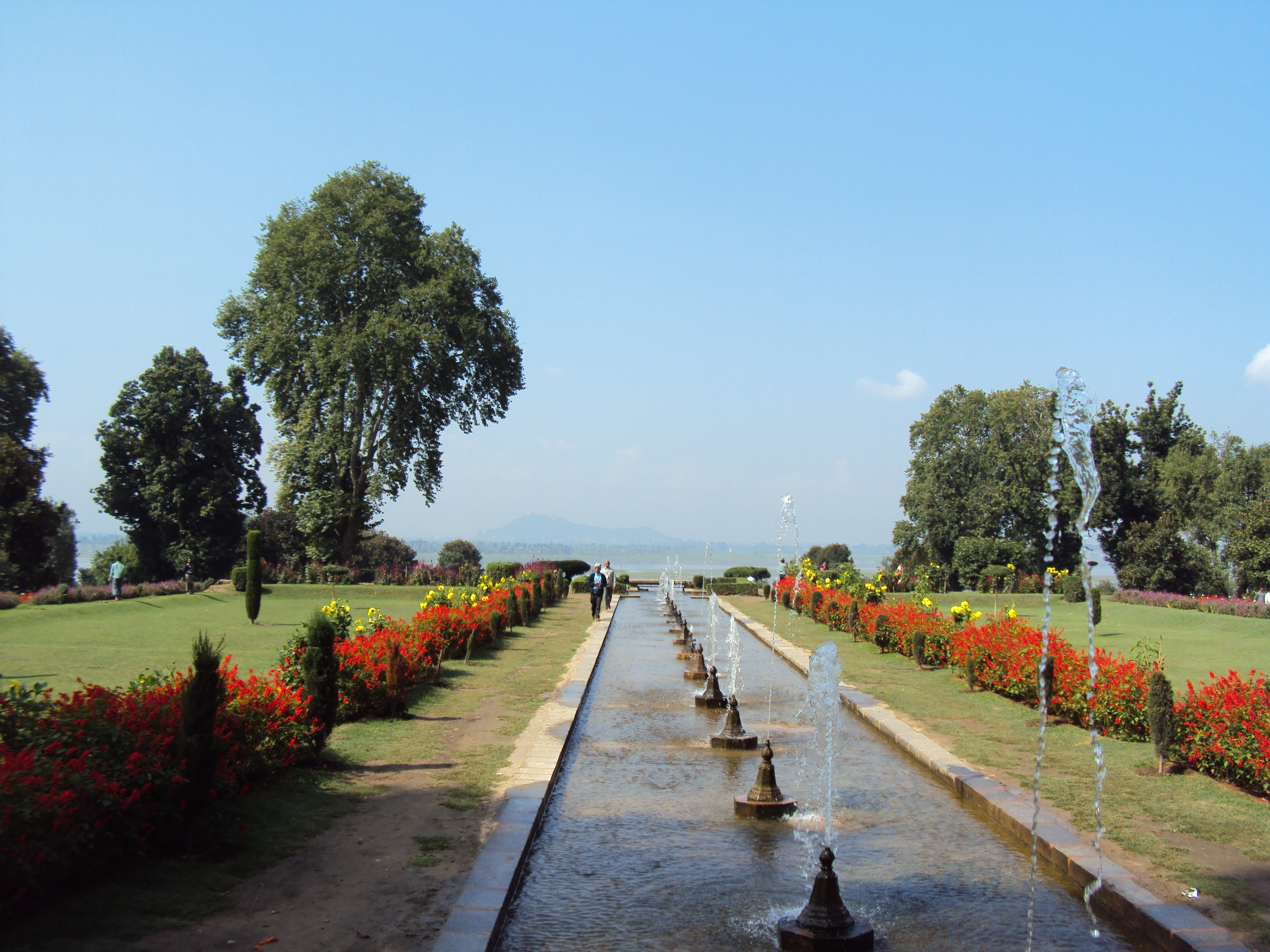
Shalimar Bagh, Srinagar, Kashmir depicting a water way

They are typically enclosed by high walls providing shade and protection, especially desirable in the harsh, arid climate where this type of garden flourished.

== Interpretation ==
Much of the use and symbolism of the paradise garden is thought to have derived from the Garden of Eden, despite most elements of the design predating the Abrahamic religions. In the Book of Genesis, the Garden of Eden is described as having a design similar to the four-fold design, with a central spring that feeds four rivers, each flowing out into the world beyond. In the Quran, the Jannah is described as being abundant with material delights including delicious foods and constantly flowing water.

Having emerged in the desert, the thirst and gratitude for water are abundant in Islamic traditions. In the Quran, rivers are the primary constituents of the paradise, and references to rain and fountains abound. In the Quran 21:30: "Did the disbelievers not observe that the heavens and the earth were closed, then We opened them? And We created from water every living thing. Would they still not believe?'." Water is associated with the virtues of purity and obedience: "Then the water was told, 'Be still'. And it was still, awaiting God's command. This is implied water, which contains neither impurity nor foam" (Tales of the Prophets, al-Kisa').

Although the concept of chahar bagh gardens representing 'paradise on earth' predates the Islamic adoption of the style, the paradisical retreats of the Persians became known as "the embodiment of the celestial paradise promised to a practicing Muslim". Gardens representing paradise on earth or paradise gardens spread throughout the Muslim-conquered world and developed into different, grander and more elaborate styles.

== Influence ==
The paradise garden is one of the few original and fundamental kinds of garden from which all gardens in history derive, sometimes in combinations. In its simplest form, the paradise garden consists of a formal, rectangular pool, having a flow just sufficient to give it movement, and a dais from which to observe it. However, a pavilion provides more permanent shelter than the original tent. Strictly aligned, formally arranged trees, especially the chenar or Platanus, provide shade.

An example of this style are the Bahá'í Terraces and Mansion of Bahjí on Mount Carmel in Israel, both of which have extensive gardens of intricate design.

== Examples ==
- Pasargadae
- Dowlatabad Garden in Yazd, created in the 18th century by the governor Mohammad Taqi Khan
- Cheshmeh-e'Ali
- Gardens of the Taj Mahal
- Al-Azhar Park, a modern interpretation located in Cairo, Egypt

== See also ==
- History of gardening
- List of garden types
- Hanging Gardens of Babylon
- Spanish garden
- Sensory garden
- Pari
- A Village Romeo and Juliet
