= Touba (disambiguation) =

Touba may refer to:

- Touba, Boké, a town in Guinea
- Touba Department, a department in Ivory Coast
- Touba, Ivory Coast, a town in Ivory Coast
- Touba, Labé, a town in Guinea
- Touba, Mali, a town in Mali
- Touba, Senegal, a city in Senegal
