= Tuba (given name) =

- Gender: female
- Language: Arabic

Origin
- Origin: طُوبَى

Other names
- Variant form: Tuğba (in Turkish)
- Anglicisations: Tooba, Touba, Toba

Tuba (also Anglicised as Tooba, Touba, or less frequently Toba; Arabic: طُوبَى, romanized: Ṭūbā, lit. 'blessedness') is a female name of Arabic origin. It has been common since the 1970s in Turkey, where it is often spelt Tuğba (and that spelling has the same pronunciation as Tuba in Turkish), but it has also been used in other parts of the Muslim world, notably in Pakistan, where it is spelled طوبیٰ in Urdu. This name derives from Ṭūbā, a tree that Muslims believe grows in heaven. By etymology, this word is borrowed from Syriac Aramaic ܛܘܼܒ݂ܵܐ ṭūḇā meaning blessedness. Other meanings ascribed are "good news", "pure beauty","delightful" and "life".

== People ==
=== Toba ===
- Toba Khedoori (born 1964), Australian artist of Iraqi heritage

=== Tooba ===
- Tooba Siddiqui (born 1984), Pakistani model
- Tooba Syed (born 1991), Pakistani feminist

=== Tuba ===
- Hilal Tuba Tosun Ayer (born 1970), Turkish female referee
- Tuba Bozkurt (born 1983), German politician
- Tuba Büyüküstün (born 1982), Turkish television and film actress
- Tuba Özkan-Haller, Turkish-American earth scientist and academic
- Tuba Ünsal (born 1981), Turkish actress and model
- Tuba Yenen (born 1991), Turkish karateka

=== Tuğba ===
- Ahu Tuğba (real name Tuğba Çetin) (1955–2024), Turkish actress
- Tuğba Danışmaz (born 1999), Turkish long jump and triple jump athlete
- Tuğba Daşdemir (born 1987), Turkish skier
- Tuğba Ekinci (born 1974), Turkish pop singer
- Tuğba Karademir (born 1985), Turkish figure skater
- Tuğba Karakaya (born 1991), Turkish middle distance runner
- Tuğba Karataş (born 1992), Turkish footballer
- Tuğba Önal (born 1974), Turkish singer
- Tuğba Özay (born 1978), Turkish model-turned-singer and a famous star in Turkey
- Tuğba Palazoğlu (born 1980), Turkish professional basketball player
- Tuğba Şenoğlu (born 1998), Turkish volleyball player
- Tuğba Taşçı (born 1984), Turkish professional basketball player
- Tuğba Tekkal (born 1985), Turkish-German footballer
- Tuğba Yurt (born 1987), a Turkish singer
