= Charbagh =

Four-part Islamic paradise garden layout

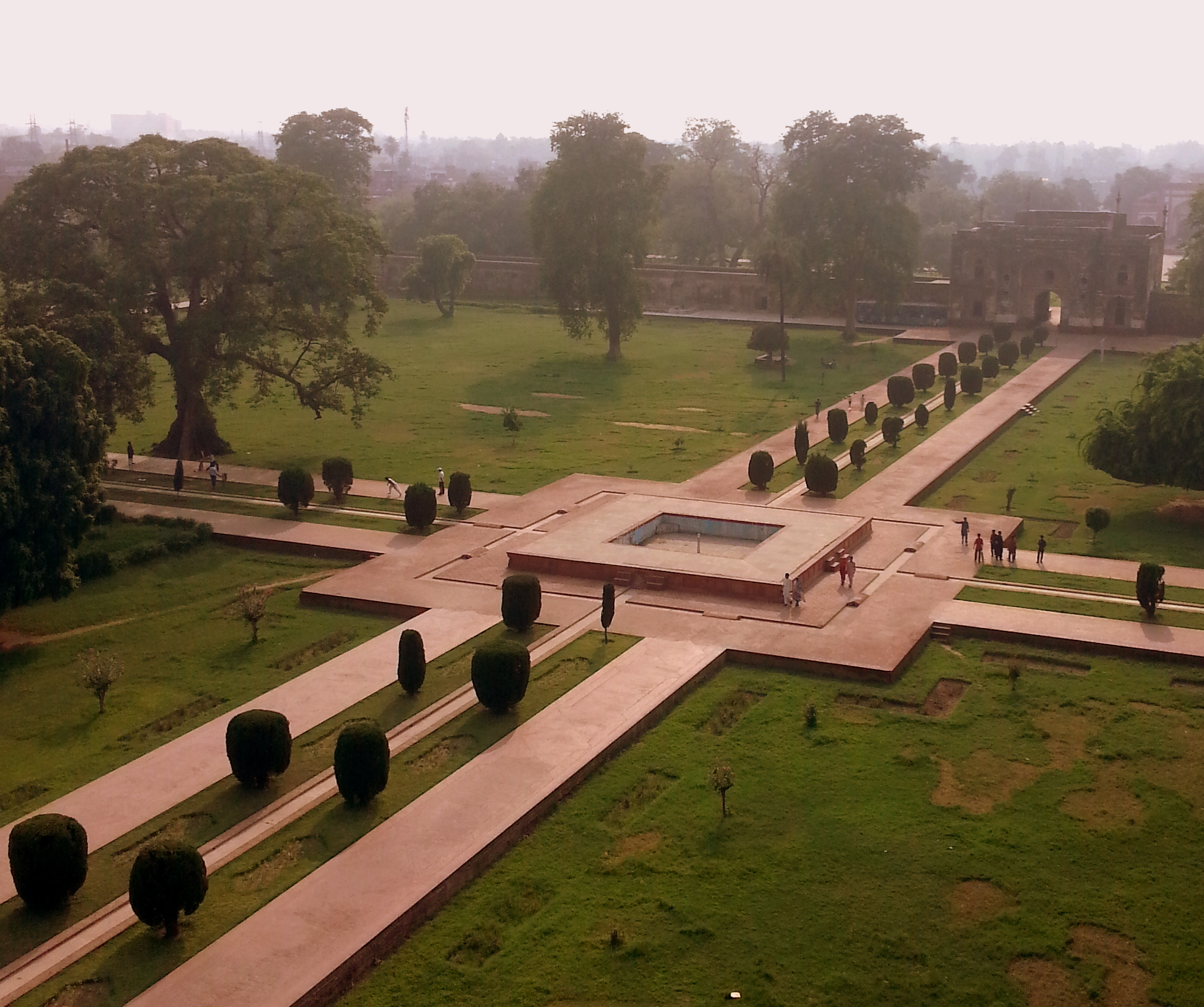
The charbagh at the Tomb of Jahangir in Lahore, Pakistan

A charbagh or chaharbagh (Persian: چهارباغ, romanized: chahārbāgh, lit. 'four gardens'; Hindi: चारबाग़ chārbāgh, Urdu: چار باغ chār bāgh, Bengali: চারবাগ) is a Persian and Indo-Persian quadrilateral garden with a layout of four gardens traditionally separated by waterways, together representing the four gardens and four rivers of Paradise mentioned in the Quran. (Note: The idea of the world divided into four parts is also present in the Book of Genesis (2:10).) The chaharbagh may also be divided by walkways instead of flowing water. Such gardens are found in countries throughout West Asia (which includes Iran), South Asia, North Africa and the former al-Andalus. A famous example of a charbagh is that of the Taj Mahal in India.

== Concept ==
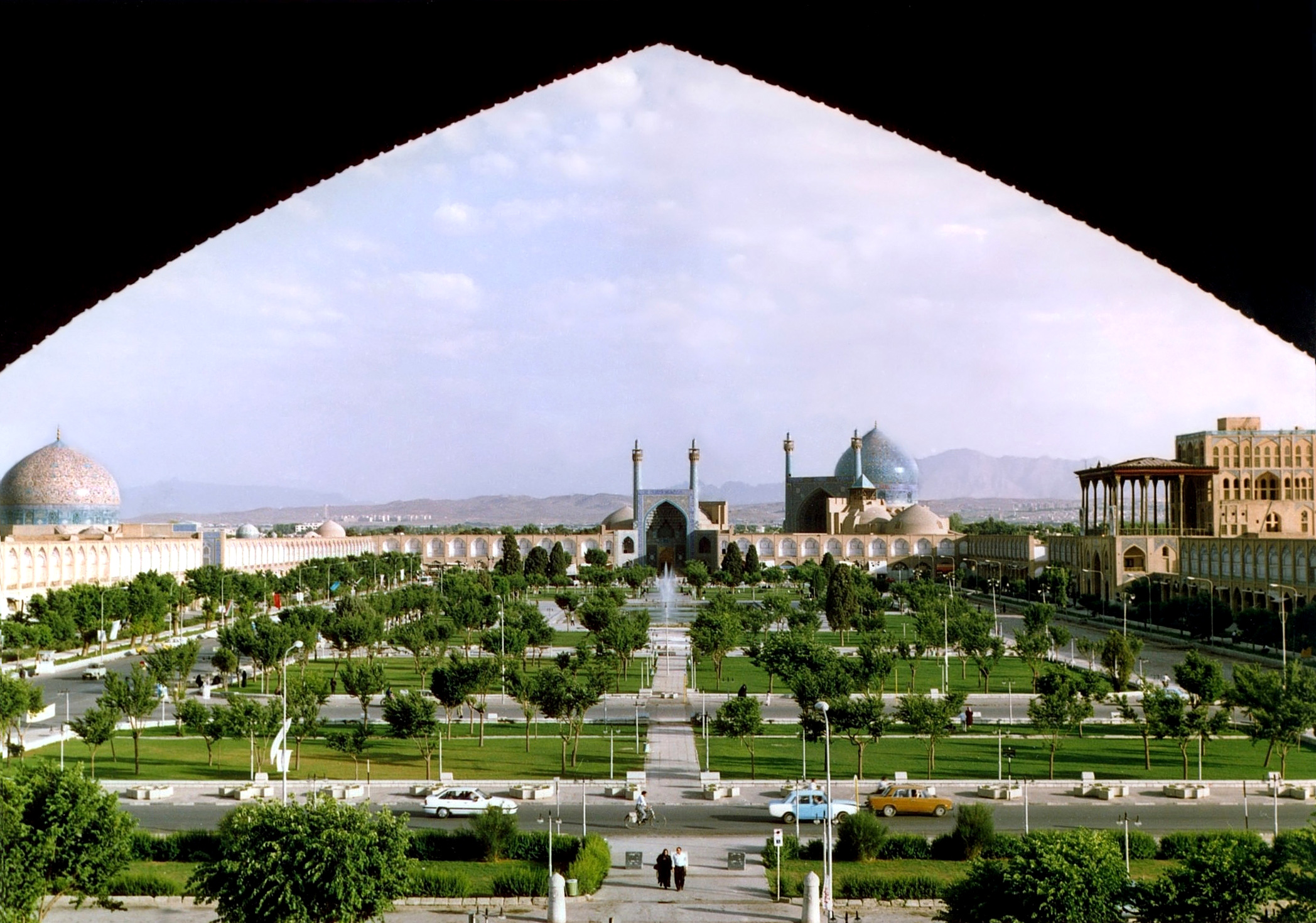
An example of chaharbagh on Naqsh-e Jahan Square (constructed 1598–1629) in Isfahan, Iran

The traditional chaharbagh has a four-part garden layout with axial waterways joining at a small square basin in the garden's centre.

== History ==
The chaharbagh layout originated in the paradise gardens of the Achaemenid Empire, as suggested by excavations at Pasargadae and Susa. The highly structured geometrical scheme of the chaharbagh became a powerful method for the organization and domestication of the landscape, itself a symbol of political territory.

After the Muslim conquest of Persia, the chaharbagh was considered to represent the four gardens of Paradise mentioned in the Quran's 55th Chapter (Surah), Ar-Rahman ('The Beneficient'):

And for him, who fears to stand before his Lord, are two gardens. (Chapter 55: Verse 46)
And beside them are two other gardens. (Chapter 55: Verse 62)

The waterways were considered to represent the four rivers mentioned in a hadith: Sayhan, Jayhan, the Euphrates and the Nile.

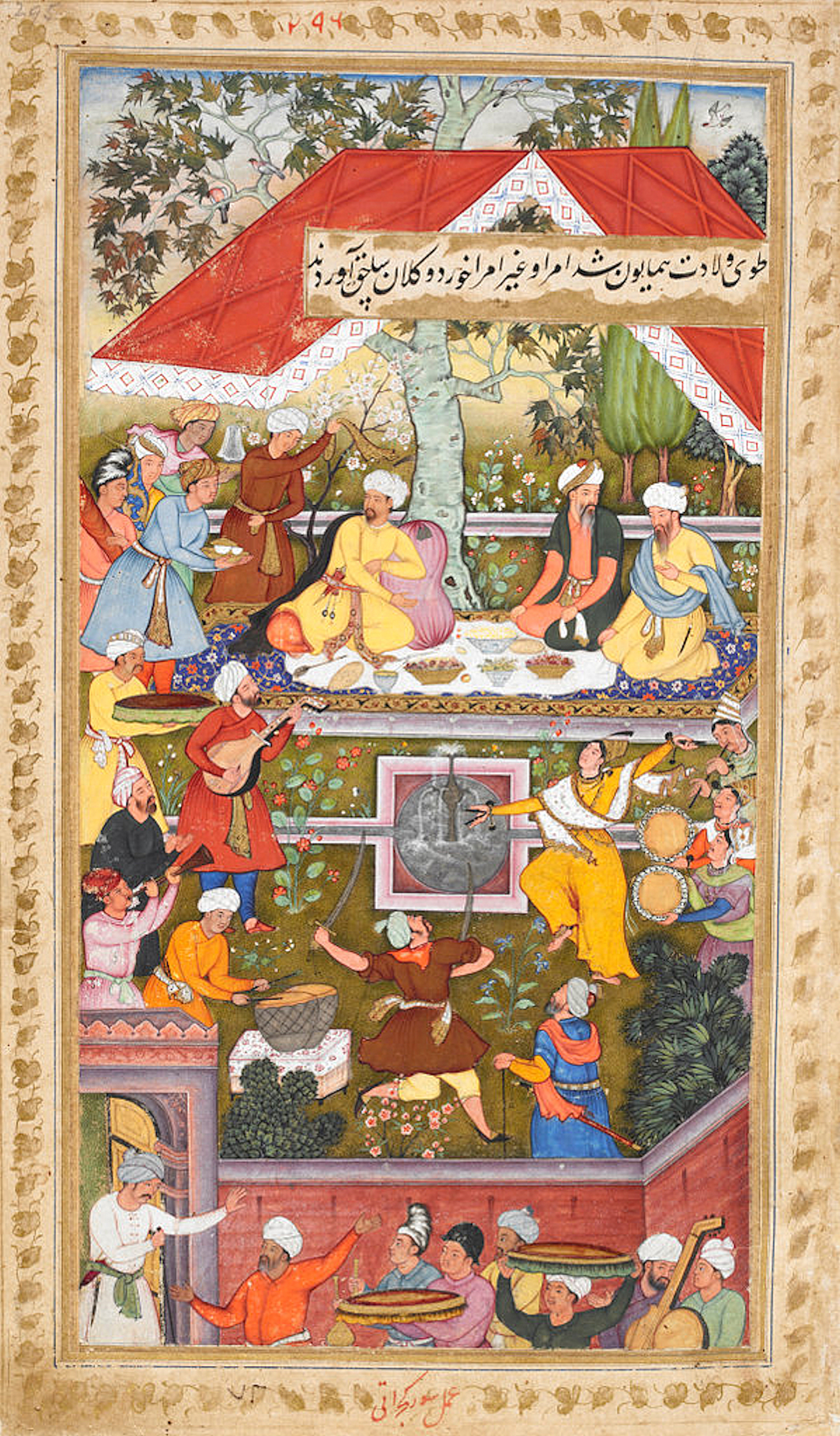
Babur celebrates the birth of Humayun in the charbagh of Kabul.

In the 16th century, the chaharbagh layout was brought from Iran to the Indian subcontinent by the Mughal dynasty founded by Babur, who was originally from Central Asia. This tradition gave birth to the Mughal gardens, which perhaps displayed its highest form in the Taj Mahal.

== Notable examples ==
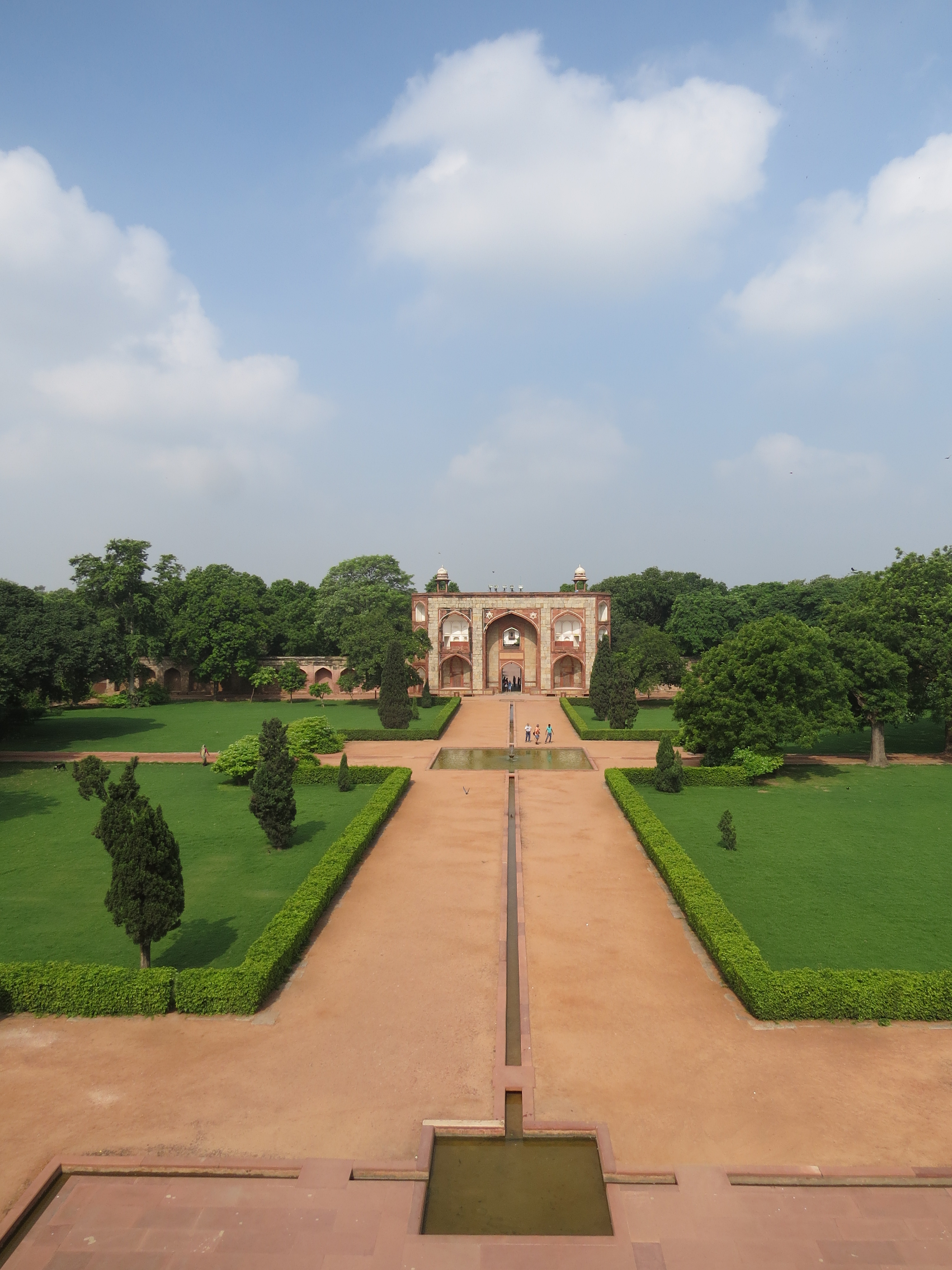
Charbagh at Humayun's Tomb, Delhi, India

Several of the first Mughal charbagh gardens of monumental scale belonged to imperial mausoleums, such as the Bagh-e Babur at Babur's Tomb, in Kabul, Afghanistan (honoring the first Mughal emperor, Babur); the charbagh at Humayun's Tomb in Delhi, India (honoring Humayun, son of Babur); and the charbagh at the Tomb of Jahangir (honoring the fourth Mughal emperor Jahangir, son of Akbar) in Lahore, Pakistan.

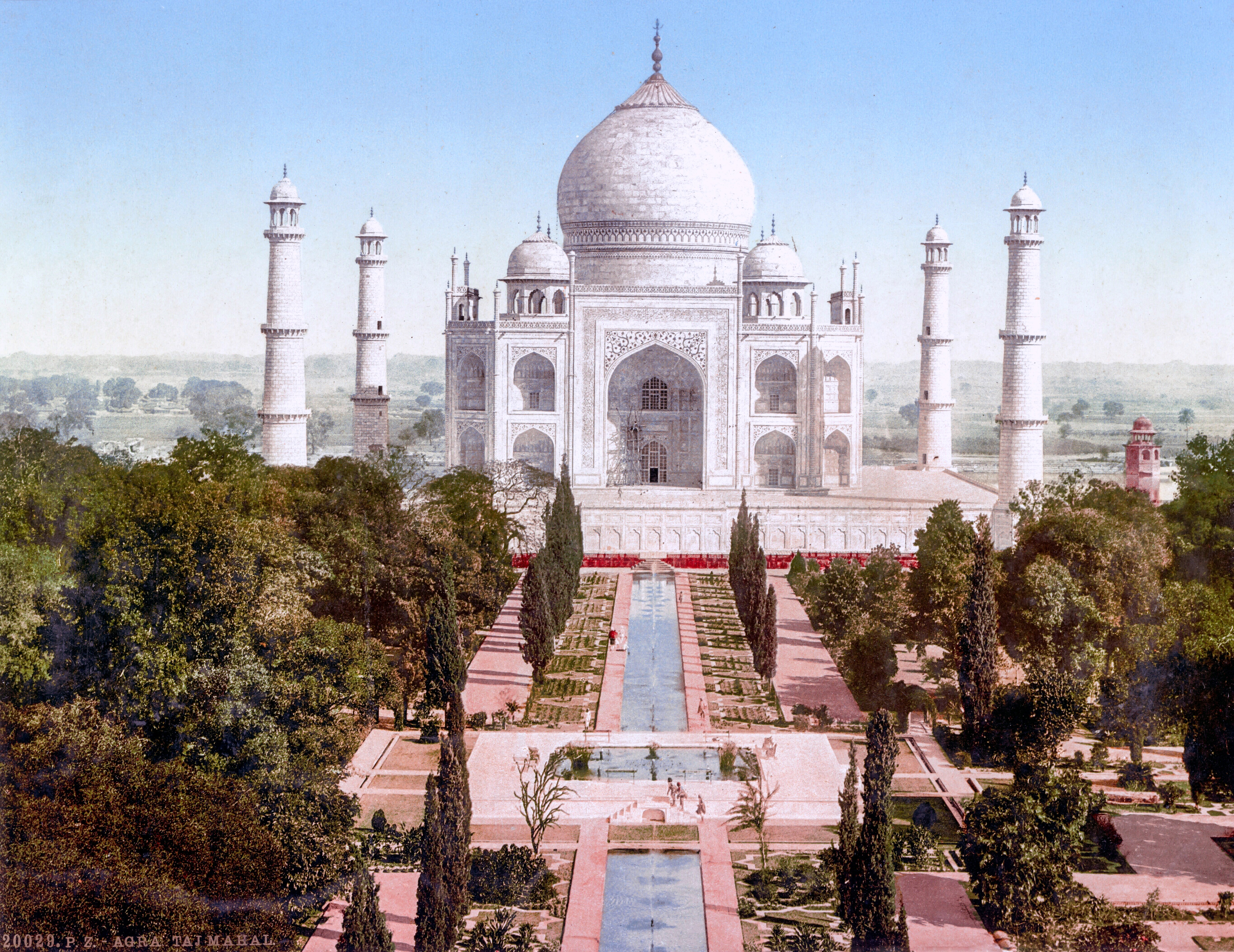
Aerial view of the charbagh of the Taj Mahal, Agra, India, showing the square basin at the intersection of four waterways

The charbagh of the Taj Mahal is also the charbagh of a mausoleum, built by Mughal emperor Shah Jahan (great-great-grandson of Babur) for his favourite Indian wife Mumtaz Mahal. Unlike the other tombs, the mausoleum is not in the centre of the garden, however archaeological excavations have revealed another garden opposite indicating that historically the mausoleum was centered as in tomb garden tradition. In the charbagh of the Taj Mahal, each of the four parts contains sixteen flower beds.

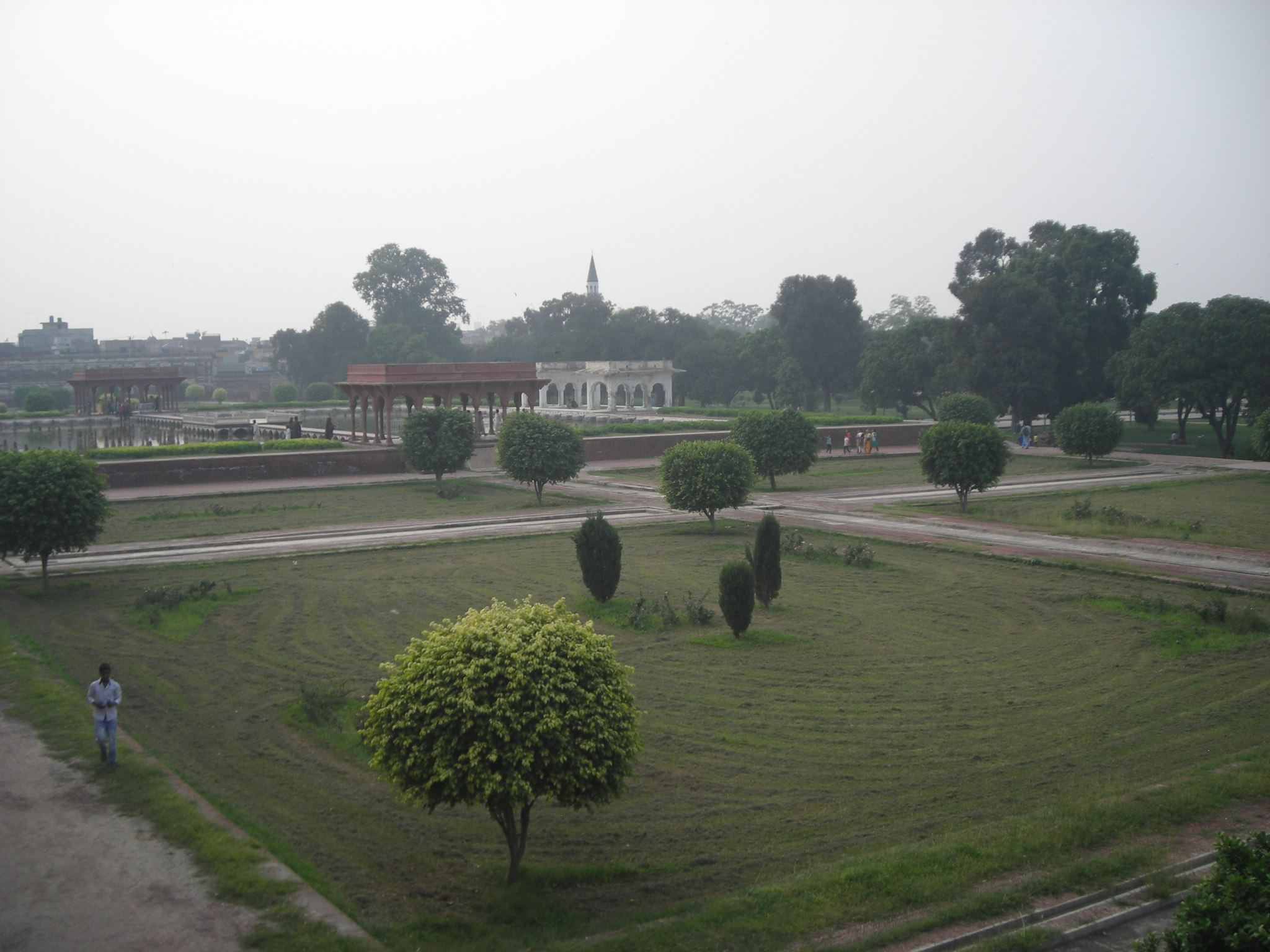
View of one charbagh garden of the Shalamar Gardens, Lahore, Pakistan, displaying the typical charbagh layout

Other Mughal charbagh gardens were built for leisure, without any mausoleum, such as the Shalamar Gardens (also known as the "Shahla Bagh"), in Lahore, Pakistan, which were also laid out by Shah Jahan. The Shalamar Gardens comprise two charbagh gardens separated by a gigantic pool.

A charbagh is located on the roof top of the Ismaili Centre in South Kensington, London.

== See also ==
- Paradise garden
