= Ṭūbā =

Tree in paradise according to Islam

Ṭūbā (Arabic: طُوبَى, lit. 'blessedness') is a tree which grows in Jannah (the Garden of Eden) according to Islam.

The term is mentioned in the Quran in surah ar-Ra'd, verse 29: "Those who believed, and work righteousness, Tuba is for them and a beautiful place of (final) return", as well as in several ahadith.

The female given name Tuba (also spelled Tooba or Touba) derives from the name of the tree and is widely used in the Muslim world, especially in the Arab world, Pakistan and Turkey.

== Ahadith ==
The tree is mentioned in collections of ahadith. According to Sahih al-Bukhari, Anas bin Malik said that Muhammad said "There is a tree in Paradise (which is so big and huge that) if a rider travels in its shade for one hundred years, he would not be able to cross it." and that Abu Hurayrah said Muhammad said: "In Paradise there is a tree in whose shade a rider could travel for a hundred years without crossing it. Recite, if you wish: ‘In shade long-extended’ [al-Waaqi’ah 56:30]"

== See also ==
- Plants in Islam
- Tuba (given name), a given name derived from the tree
- Touba, a city in central Senegal sometimes said to be named for the tree
- Sidrat al-Muntaha, a lote tree that marks the end of the seventh heaven in Islam
- Zaqqum, a tree in hell
- Tree of life, an archetype in many mythologies and religious traditions
