= Shalimar =

Shalimar or Shalamar may refer to:

- Shalimar Gardens (disambiguation), three historic royal Mughal gardens (or baghs) of the Mughal Empire in South Asia:
  - Shalimar Bagh, Srinagar, Jammu and Kashmir, India; built in 1619
  - Shalimar Gardens, Lahore, Pakistan; a UNESCO World Heritage Site built in 1641
  - Shalimar Bagh, Delhi, India; built in 1653

== South Asia ==
- Shalimar Garden, Ghaziabad, an area in Ghaziabad, India
- Shalimar, Lahore, one of the constituent towns of Lahore, Pakistan
  - Shalamar Institute of Health Sciences
    - Shalamar Hospital
    - Shalamar Medical and Dental College
- Shalimar railway station, serving Howrah and Kolkata, India
  - Shalimar rail yard
- Shalimar Express, train between Delhi and Jammu Tawi, India
- Shalimar Express (Pakistan), train between Karachi and Lahore, Pakistan

== Other places ==
- Shalimar, alternative name of Shadmehr, a small city in Razavi Khorasan Province, Iran
- Shalimar, Florida, a town in the United States

== Music ==
- Shalamar, a soul-R&B group
- "Kashmiri Song" (1902), also known by its first line "Pale hands I loved beside the Shalimar"
- A river in "The Hippopotamus Song" by Flanders and Swann

== Film and literature ==
- Shalimar (1946 film), a 1946 Bollywood film
- Shalimar (1978 film), a 1978 Bollywood film
- Shalimar, a book by Indian writer Manohar Malgonkar
- Shalimar the Clown, a 2005 novel by Salman Rushdie
- Shalimar Fox, a character in Mutant X (TV series)
- A town in Song of Solomon (novel), a 1977 novel by Toni Morrison

== Other uses ==
- HMS Shalimar, a Royal Navy ship
- Shalimar-class ferry, two classes in the Indian Navy
- Shalimar (perfume), the flagship fragrance of perfume house Guerlain
- Frank Coutts Hendry, used the pseudonym Shalimar
