= Shalamar Nursing College =

Nursing College Located in Lahore, Pakistan

- Motto: "To Care..."
- Type: Private
- Established: 2006
- Affiliations: Shalamar Institute of Health Sciences, University of Health Sciences, Lahore, Pakistan Nursing Council
- Location: Lahore, Punjab, Pakistan; 31°34′31″N 74°22′44″E
- Campus: Urban
- Website: www.snc.edu.pk

Shalamar Nursing College (abbreviated as SNC), established in 2006 and named after the historical Shalimar Gardens, Lahore, is a private Nursing school located on Shalimar Link Road, Lahore in Shalimar Town. The college provides undergraduate 4 years B.Sc Nursing and 2 years Post RN B.Sc Nursing degrees.

The college is accredited by the Pakistan Nursing Council. It is affiliated with the University of Health Sciences, Lahore (UHS). Shalamar Hospital is attached as a training and teaching hospital, while Shalamar Medical and Dental College (SMDC) shares the campus with the college.

== History ==
A trust by the name of the Businessmen Hospital Trust (BHT) was established in 1974 for the creation of a composite medical complex. The project was to comprise a charitable hospital, a research center and schools of medicine and surgery, dentistry, nursing and pharmacy. Shalamar Hospital was established in 1982, followed by a nursing school in 2006. Construction of Shalamar Medical and Dental College started in 2007. In 2009, construction of campus was finished and academics began in late January 2011.

== Courses ==
The college provides undergraduate 4 years B.Sc Nursing and 2 years Post RN B.Sc Nursing degrees.

== Teaching hospital ==
Shalamar Hospital, established in 1982, is a 350-bedded private teaching hospital is attached with the nursing college for clinical training of the students. It is primed to support all the needs of patients, especially the lower income population of Lahore. The hospital provides consultation, diagnostic and treatment services for almost all medical and surgical specialties through its hospital based clinical services and community program.

== See also ==
- Nursing in Pakistan
- Pakistan Nursing Council
- Shalamar Institute of Health Sciences
- Shalamar Hospital
- Shalamar Medical and Dental College
- University of Health Sciences, Lahore
