= Shalamar Institute of Health Sciences =

Umbrella organization and medical complex in Lahore, Pakistan

Official logo of Shalamar Institute of Health Sciences - An umbrella organization and medical complex providing health care in Lahore, Pakistan

Shalamar Institute of Health Sciences (abbreviated as SIHS), named after Shalimar Gardens, Lahore, is a medical complex and an umbrella organization providing health care and medical services. It consists of Shalamar Hospital, Shalamar Nursing College and Shalamar Medical and Dental College, all of which are situated on Shalimar Link Road, Lahore in Shalimar Town.

== Colleges ==
=== Shalamar Nursing College ===
Shalamar Nursing College, established in 2006, is a nursing school accredited by the Pakistan Nursing Council and affiliated with the University of Health Sciences, Lahore (UHS). The college provides undergraduate 4 years B.Sc Nursing and 2 years Post RN B.Sc Nursing degrees.

=== Shalamar Medical and Dental College ===
It was established in 2009. It is accredited by the Pakistan Medical and Dental Council, affiliated with the College of Physicians and Surgeons Pakistan and University of Health Sciences, Lahore for postgraduate training and undergraduate degrees respectively.

== Training hospitals ==
=== Shalamar Hospital ===
Shalamar Hospital, established in 1982, is a 350-bedded private teaching hospital is attached with Shalamar Institute of Health Sciences for clinical training of its students. The hospital provides consultation, diagnostic and treatment services for almost all medical and surgical specialties through its hospital based clinical services and community program.
