= Shalamar Medical and Dental College =

Medical college in Lahore, Pakistan

Coordinates: 31.5758°N 74.3799°E

Shalamar Medical & Dental College شالامار میڈیکل اینڈڈینٹل کالج
- Motto: To care
- Type: Private
- Established: 2009
- Founder: Syed Babar Ali
- Affiliations: College of Physicians and Surgeons Pakistan; Educational Commission for Foreign Medical Graduates; Foundation for Advancement of International Medical Education and Research; Higher Education Commission of Pakistan; Pakistan Medical and Dental Council; University of Health Sciences, Lahore; World Health Organization; World Directory of Medical Schools
- Chairman: Shahid Hussain
- Principal: Muhammad Zahid Bashir
- Undergraduates: MBBS, BDS
- Location: Lahore, Punjab, Pakistan
- Campus: Urban
- Colors: Maroon and gray
- Mascot: Shalamarians
- Website: www.smdc.edu.pk

Shalamar Medical and Dental College (abbreviated as SMDC) and named after Shalimar Gardens, Lahore, is a Private College of Medicine and Dentistry located in Lahore. It was established in 2009. Shalamar Hospital and Fauji Foundation Hospital Lahore are the affiliated Hospitals.

== Recognition ==
- Recognized by the College of Physicians and Surgeons of Pakistan.
- It is accredited by the Pakistan Medical and Dental Council and registered with the Educational Commission for Foreign Medical Graduates. Shalamar Hospital and Fauji Foundation Hospital, Lahore are attached as training and teaching hospitals. Shalamar Medical and Dental College is a college within the larger institute, Shalamar Institute of Health Sciences.
- Affiliated with the University of Health Sciences, Lahore.

== Academic programs ==
- MBBS

== Publications ==
- AXON: The Unheard Impulses of Shalamarians - Annual Magazine

== College convocations ==
In 2016, Shalamar Medical and Dental College held its 2nd convocation for its 99 graduating students who were awarded degrees. The convocation's chief guest was former Justice (Retired) Khalil-ur-Rehman Ramday. Other noted personalities at the event were the 2 governors of the Shalamar Institute of Health Sciences, Chaudhry Ahmad Saeed and Syed Babar Ali.

In 2018, 97 graduating students were conferred with degrees and the chief guest was Pakistan's noted personality in the healthcare field Dr. Sania Nishtar.

== See also ==
- Shalamar Hospital
- Shalamar Nursing College
- Shalamar Institute of Health Sciences
