= Shalimar Gardens =

Shalimar Gardens may refer to the following Mughal gardens:

- Shalimar Bagh, Srinagar, India
- Shalimar Gardens, Delhi, India
  - Shalimar Bagh Assembly constituency
  - Shalimar Bagh metro station
- Shalimar Gardens, Lahore, Pakistan
