= Ramgarh, Lahore =

Ramgarh رامگڑھ
- Locality
- Location in Pakistan
- Coordinates: 31°34.2′N 74°22.9′E
- Country: Pakistan
- Province: Punjab
- District: Lahore
- Tehsil: Shalimar
- Time zone: UTC+5 (PST)

Ramgarh (Punjabi, Urdu: رامگڑھ) is a neighbourhood in Shalimar Tehsil of Lahore in Punjab, Pakistan. It is a densely populated area.
