= Shad Bagh =

Neighbourhood in Lahore, Punjab, Pakistan

Coordinates: 31°36′N 74°20′E

Shad Bagh شاد باغ
- Neighbourhood
- Interactive map of Shad Bagh شاد باغ
- Country: Pakistan
- Province: Punjab
- City: Lahore
- Tehsil: Shalamar

Shad Bagh (Punjabi, Urdu: شاد باغ) is a neighbourhood in Shalamar Tehsil of Lahore, Punjab, Pakistan. Shad Bagh is a predominantly mixed residential and commercial area.

== Localities ==
- Goal Bagh
- Afzal Park
- Fazal Park
- Government Girls high School Shad Bagh
- Government college for Woman Shad Bagh
- Government High School Amir Road
- Sajjad Colony, Amir Road
- Feroze Bagh
- Scheme No.2
- Toka wala Chowk
- Fawara Chowk
- Nawaz Sharif Bagh
- Gol Bagh
- Tajpura Bagh
- Akram Park
- China Scheme Bagh
- Chiragh Bagh
- Chaudhry Bagh
- Naya Shadbagh
- Tajpura Ground
- Nabi Bakhsh Bagh
- Taj Bagh
- Chohdary Park
- Allama Usman Arshad Park
- D-Block Park
