= Shalimar Garden, Ghaziabad =

Integrated township in Uttar Pradesh, India

Coordinates: 28°41′25″N 77°21′24″E

Shalimar Garden is a residential and commercial locality in the North Western part of the city of Ghaziabad, Uttar Pradesh. It comprises three wards of the Ghaziabad Municipal Corporation and, accordingly, has three major divisions, viz. Shalimar Garden (Main), Shalimar Garden Extension-I and Shalimar Garden Extension-II. Almost all the construction in the area is that of Low Rise builder apartments, with shops on the lower floors and apartments on the higher floors.

== Location ==
It lies on the north of G.T. Road, and is bound by Dilshad Garden (Delhi) on the west and Rajendra Nagar, Sahibabad on the east. The Loni Road forms its northern boundary. The nearest metro station of the Delhi Metro network is Raj Bagh, which is at a distance of 1.5 km. The nearest bus depot is Seemapuri Depot, which is at a distance of around 2 km. The nearest railway station is Sahibabad, which is around 4 km away. The nearest international airport is the Indira Gandhi International Airport, located approximately 30 km away, while the nearest domestic airport is Hindon Airport, located approximately 2.1 km away. The Ghaziabad, Anand Vihar, New Delhi and Old Delhi railway stations are at distances of around 12 km, 7 km, 15 km and 14 km respectively.

== History ==
From the historical, cultural, theological, and archeological points of view, the area is a prosperous one. This has been proved from the research work and excavations done in Trans-Hindon. The excavation carried out at the mound of Kaseri situated on the bank of the Hindon River, 2 km north of Mohan Nagar shows that civilization was developed here in 2500 BC.[1] During the reign of Sultan Muhammad bin Tughluq in 1313, this entire region had become a huge battlefield.[2] Sultan Nasiruddin who was famous for his simplicity and honesty, spent his childhood in the Loni fort nearby. The attack of Taimur came on the Loni fort and the human massacre by him are well known references of history. The importance of Loni increased during the Mughal period as the Mughal emperors used to come here for hunting and pleasure trips. A Baage Ranap is a memorial of that period.

This area also witnessed fierce battles during the Revolt of 1857, as the revolting Sepoys marched into Delhi through this place and the company forces tried to stop them. Being very close to Shahdara, which has been a very important centre for trade and commerce to the east of Yamuna, for the last 400 years, it can be presumed that Shalimar Garden and nearby areas have ever since been very prosperous.

The modern locality of Shalimar Garden, although it is very new relatively and started developing only in the late 1960s, when small labour settlements started springing up thanks to the new industrial set-ups in the Sahibabad Industrial area. By the early 70s, local real estate developers, keeping in mind the locational advantage of the area, started developing the area by deforesting the remaining jungles and acquiring the farmlands from the villagers of Pasonda and Bhopura. Streets were laid, and other civic amenities like sanitation, drainage, electricity, etc. were taken care of, and numerous plots of varying sizes were sold off. Until, the late nineties, almost all the plots had landed in the hands of small and big builder-promoters, who promptly constructed an apartment building on every plot, thus overburdening the infrastructure greatly. This, until the close of the last decade, caused a lot of infrastructural problems, right from frequent load shedding to water-scarcity, etc. but those were teething problems every new establishment faces, and now they are beginning to get sorted out, as is also the case in other neighbouring localities.

Population increase in this area was considerable in that period as there were a lot of people coming from the north, south, and east parts of India, working in the factories and offices located in Central Delhi. These people were attracted by good transport links, proximity to the business center of Delhi, and relatively low costs of houses. Moreover, there were some Kashmir Valley Pandits that moved here after being forced to leave their lands due to government rehabilitation programs starting from the early 1990s.
