= Shalimar Tehsil =

Shalimar تحصیل شالیمار
- Tehsil
- Country: Pakistan
- Province: (Punjab, Pakistan) Punjab
- District: Lahore
- Union Councils: 56

Population (2023)
  - Total: 2,670,140

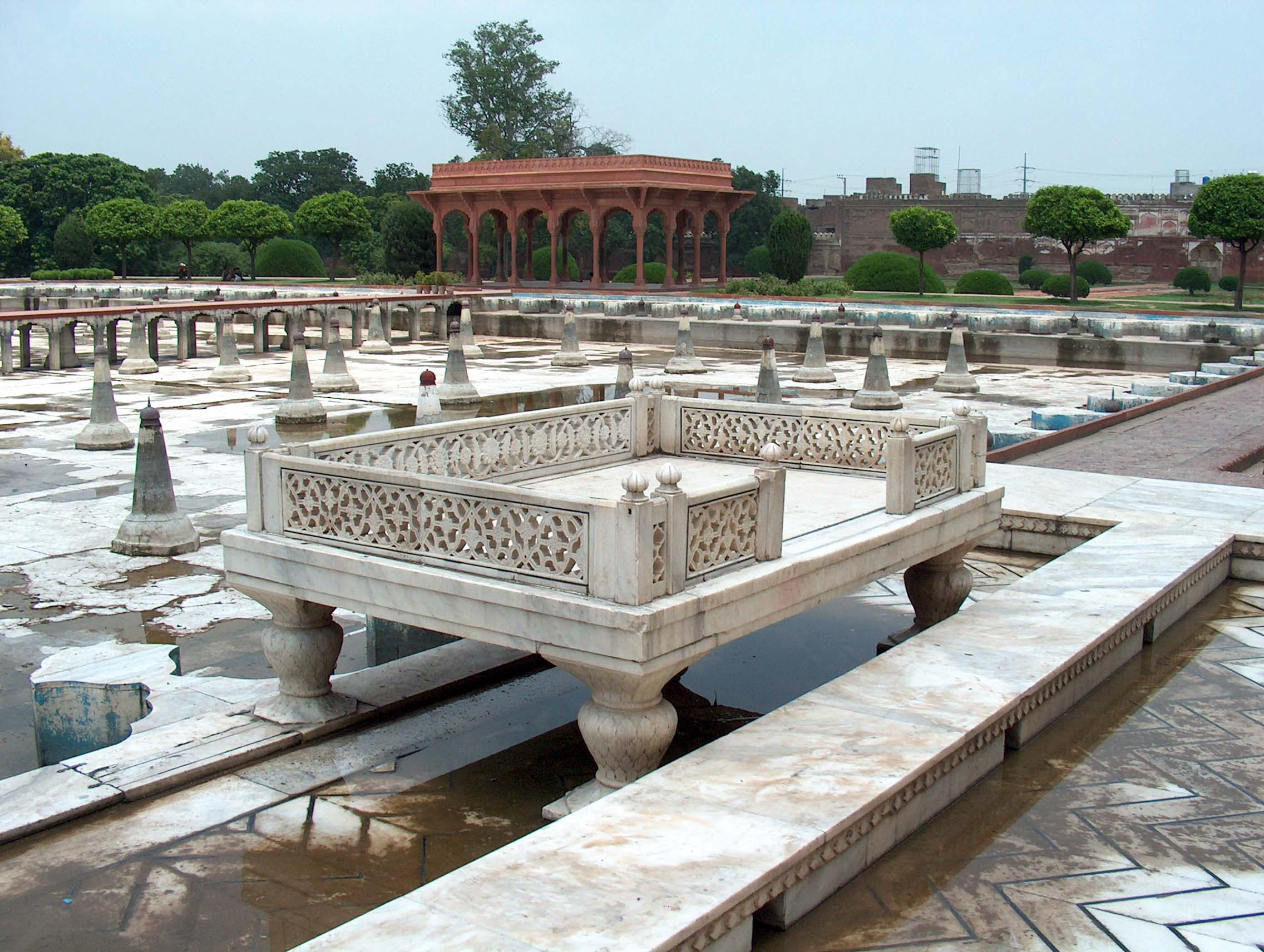
The second level of the Shalimar Gardens Also known as the level of fountains

Shalimar (Punjabi, Urdu: شالیمار) is a tehsil in Lahore, Punjab, Pakistan. It forms one of the 10 municipalities of Lahore..Its population is 2670140 according to 2023 census. The tehsil has an area of 272 km². The population density is 9817 km².

== History ==
Shalimar is one of the oldest neighbourhoods in Lahore, located along the historic Grand Trunk Road. Settlement in this area dates back to the 15th century during the Mughul Empire. The town is named after the Shalimar Gardens, built by Emperor Shah Jahan in 1640. The Mela Chiraghan festival used to take place at Shalimar Gardens, until President Ayub Khan banned it in 1958. Shalimar was officially declared a township in 1962 and became an administrative town (tehsil) of Lahore City District in 2001.

== Neighbourhoods ==
- Bhaghatpura (UC 15)
- Gujjarpura (UC 16)
- Rehmatpura (UC 17)
- Begampura (UC 18)
- Chah Miran (UC 19)
- Bilal Bagh (UC 20)
- Makhanpura (UC 21)
- Kot Khawaja Saeed (UC 22)
- Shad Bagh (UC 23)
- Wassanpura (UC 24)
- Faiz Bagh (UC 25)
- Farooqganj (UC 26)
- Crown Park (UC 33)
- Madhu Lal Hussain (UC 34)
- Muhammad Din Colony(UC 35)
- Baghbanpura (UC 36)
- Angori Bagh (UC 46)
- Ramgarh (UC 47)

== Academic Institutions ==
- University of Engineering and Technology, Lahore

== Healthcare ==
- Shalimar Hospital
