= Shalamar Hospital =

- Businessmen Hospital Trust

Geography
- Location: Lahore, Punjab, Pakistan
- Coordinates: 30°34′31″N 74°22′47″E

Organisation
- Care system: Private
- Type: General
- Affiliated university: Shalamar Institute of Health Sciences

Services
- Emergency department: Yes
- Beds: 500

History
- Founded: 1982

Links
- Website: www.shalamarhospital.org.pk
- Lists: Hospitals in Pakistan

Shalamar Hospital, established in 1982 and named after the historical Shalimar Gardens, Lahore, is a non-profit hospital located on Shalimar Link Road, Lahore in Shalimar Town. It was founded in 1982 by a Pakistani businessman Chaudhry Ahmad Mukhtar and his family.

Besides the endowment fund, it also depends on donations and grants from other private sources in Pakistan.

== Features ==
- Accident, Emergency and Trauma Department
- Audiometry
- Blood Bank
- Burns and Reconstructive Surgery Center
- Cafeterias
- Catheterization Laboratory
- Chest Clinic and Spirometry Center
- Coronary Care Unit
- Diabetes and Endocrine Clinic (SIDER)
- Dialysis Center
- Dispensary
- Echo cardiography
- Electro encephalography (EEG)
- ERCP and MRCP
- Esophagogastroduodenoscopy (EGD)
- Fertility Clinic
- Forensics Laboratory
- General Operation Theater (10 rooms)
  - Cystoscopic Urologic Surgery
  - Endoscopic Surgery
  - Laparoscopic Surgery
- General Medical, Pediatric and Surgical Wards
- Intensive Care Unit
- IT Laboratory
- Labor Room
- Library
- Medical Laboratory
- Nursery and Neonatal Intensive Care Unit
- Obesity Center
- Optometry
- Private Clinic
- Pathology Laboratory
- Pharmacy
- Physiotherapy clinic
- Private Rooms
- Radiology Center
  - CT Scan
  - Doppler Scans
  - Fluoroscopy
  - Mammography
  - MRI Scan
- Waste Disposal Center

== Departments ==
- Department of Accident & Emergency
- Department of Anesthesiology and Intensive Care
- Department of Audiology
- Department of Cardiology
- Department of Cardiovascular Surgery
- Department of Clinical Pathology and Hematology
- Department of Community Medicine
- Department of Dentistry
- Department of Dermatology
- Department of ENT (Otorhinolaryngology)
- Department of Forensic Medicine and Toxicology
- Department of Gynecology and Obstetrics
- Department of Internal Medicine
  - Endocrinology Division
  - Gastroenterology and Hepatology Division
  - Infectious Diseases Division
  - Neurology Division
  - Pulmonology Division
  - Rheumatology Division
- Department of Nephrology and Hemodialysis
- Department of Ophthalmology
- Department of Orthopedics
- Department of Pediatrics and Neonatology
- Department of Physiotherapy
- Department of Plastic and Reconstructive Surgery
- Department of Psychiatry
- Department of Radiology
- Department of Surgery
  - Bariatric Surgery Division
- Department of Urology

== World Diabetes Day ==
Each year, a week long free medical camp, a seminar and a walk is conducted at the Shalimar Hospital on the 'World Diabetes Day'. Hundreds of patients are examined by the hospital doctors and cholesterol, blood sugar (HbA1c) tests are done free of cost during the camp since it is a charitable hospital. These patients are also provided with free medicines.
