= Shalamar Gardens, Lahore =

Mughal garden complex in Lahore, Pakistan

UNESCO World Heritage Site
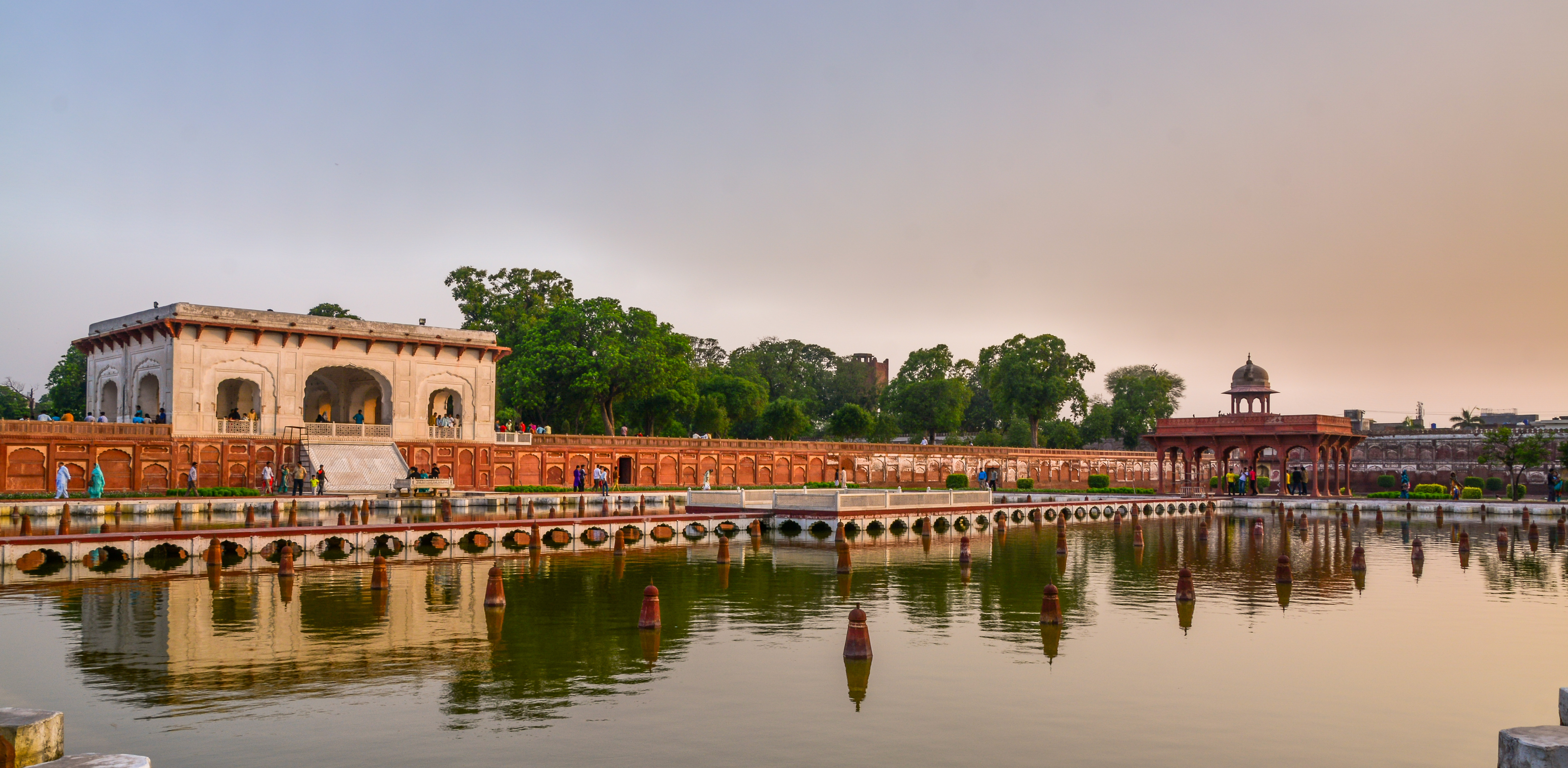

- Location within Lahore Location within Punjab, Pakistan Location within Pakistan
- Location: Lahore, Punjab, Pakistan
- Part of: Fort and Shalamar Gardens in Lahore
- Criteria: Cultural: (i), (ii), (iii)
- Reference: 171-002
- Inscription: 1981 (5th Session)
- Coordinates: 31°35′09″N 74°22′55″E

The Shalamar Gardens (Note: Persian: باغ شالیمار, romanized: Bāġ i Śālīmār, Punjabi: شالمار باغ, romanized: Śālamār Bāġ) or Shalimar Gardens (Urdu: شالیمار باغات, romanized: Śālīmār Bāġāt) are a Mughal garden complex besides Baghbanpura, located in Lahore, Punjab, Pakistan. The 17th-century gardens date from the period of the Mughal Empire, and are now one of country's most popular tourist destinations.

The Shalamar Gardens were laid out as a Charbagh-style complex. Construction of the gardens began in 1641 during the reign of emperor Shah Jahan, and was completed in 1642. In 1981, the Shalamar Gardens were inscribed as a UNESCO World Heritage Site as they embody Mughal garden design at the apogee of its development.

== Etymology ==
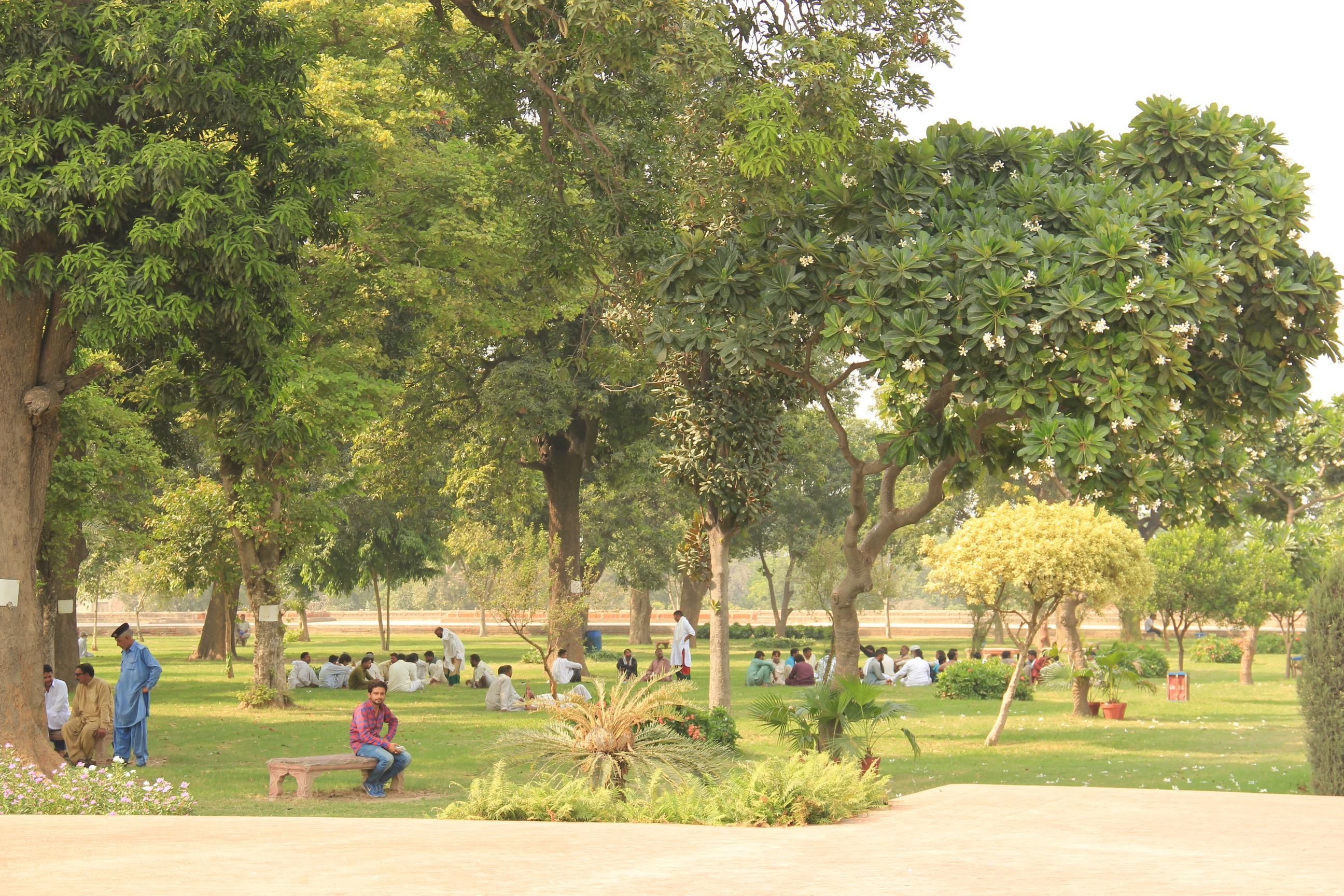
The gardens provide a popular recreation spot for Lahore's men

The gardens were originally known as Farah Bakhsh (فرح بخش; lit. 'delightful') until the reign of Shah Alam I. The present name was first used for them by the historians of Nader Shah, in the form of Shola-i-Mah (شعله ماہ; lit. 'ray of the moon'). It has been suggested that the name is derived from Sanskrit shala (lit. 'house or abode') and either Turkic mar (lit. 'joy') or Kashmiri mar (lit. 'stream'), thus meaning the 'abode of joy' or the 'abode of streams', respectively. Muhammad Ishtiaq Khan believes that 'Shalamar' is a corruption of Shalimar, and suggests its derivation from two Kashmiri words, shali (lit. 'rice paddy') and mar (lit. 'black loamy soil'), giving its meaning as 'black soil for growing rice paddy'.

During a debate in the court of Ranjit Singh, his courtiers told the maharaja that shala was a Turkic word which meant pleasure while mar meant the place to live in. However Ranjit Singh remained unconvinced, believing that the name was derived from the Punjabi words shala (lit. God) and mar (lit. Curse), hence meaning the 'curse of God'. He renamed the gardens as Shahla Bagh (شہلا باغ), from Persian shahla (lit. 'sweetheart with black eyes') and bagh (lit. 'garden'), translating into 'garden of the black-eyed sweetheart'. According to Syad Muhammad Latif:

The courtiers present passed high eulogies on the Maharájá's ingenuity in selecting so charming a name for the famous gardens of Láhore, and it was ordered, accordingly, that henceforward the gardens be called by that name, and written so in all public correspondence.

== Location ==
The Shalimar Garden is located next to the Grand Trunk Road, about 5 kilometres (3.1 mi) east of the Delhi Gate of the Walled City of Lahore.

== Background ==
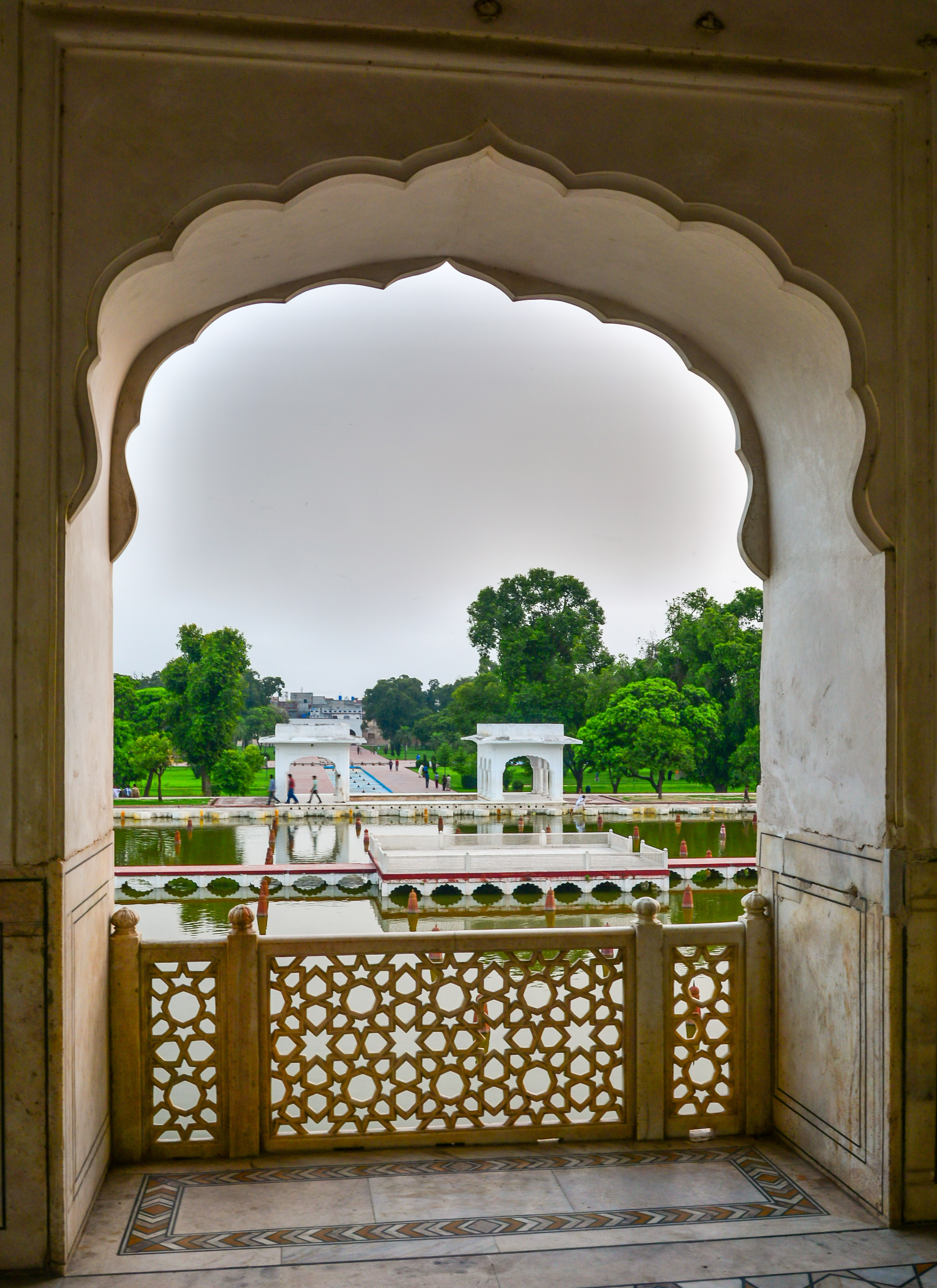
View from Farah Baksh (Bestower of Pleasure) terrace

Lahore's Shalimar Gardens were built by the Mughal royal family primarily as a venue for them to entertain guests, though a large portion was open to the general public. The gardens' design was influenced by the older Shalimar Gardens in Kashmir that were built by Shah Jahan's father, Jahangir. Unlike the gardens in Kashmir which relied on naturally sloping landscapes, the waterworks in Lahore required extensive engineering to create artificial cascades and terraces.

The Shalimar Gardens were designed as a Charbagh paradise garden. Though the word Bagh is translated simply as 'garden', bagh represents a harmonious existence between humans and nature, and represents a poetic connection between heaven and earth. All natural elements of the bagh are appreciated,including the sun, moon, and air. Muhammad Saleh Kamboh, historian to Shah Jahan, reported that the gardens of Kashmir inspired the design for the Shalimar Garden in Lahore, and that a wide variety of trees and flowers grew together in the garden.

The site was chosen for its stable water supply. The project was managed by Khalilullah Khan, a noble of Shah Jahan's court, in cooperation with Mulla Alaul Maulk Tuni. Ali Mardan Khan was responsible for most of the construction, and had a 100-mile-long canal built to bring water from the foothills of Kashmir to the site.

The site of the Shalimar Gardens originally belonged to the Arain Mian family of Baghbanpura. Mian Muhammad Yusuf, then the head of the Arain Mian family, ceded the site of Ishaq Pura to the emperor Shah Jahan in order for the gardens to be built. In return, Shah Jahan granted the Arain Mian family governance of the Shalimar Gardens, and the gardens remained under their custodianship for over 350 years.

== History ==
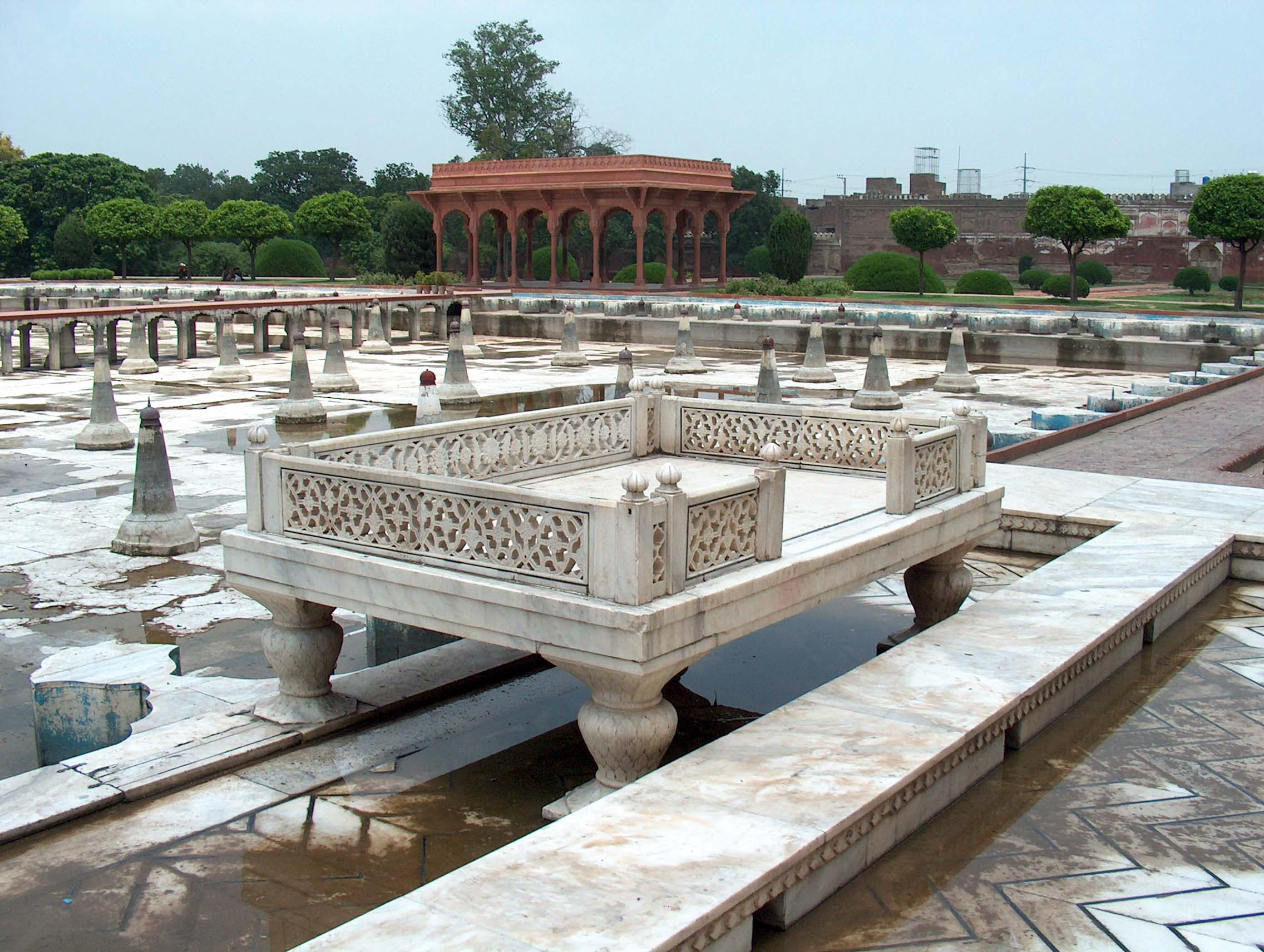
Inside Shalimar Gardens

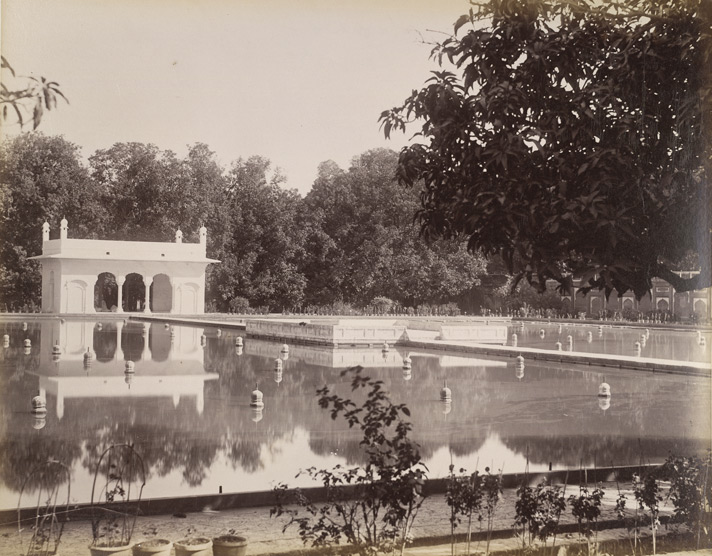
Shalimar Gardens in 1895

Construction of the gardens began on 3 Rabi-ul-Awwal 1051AH(6 June 1641), and took 17 months and 14 days to complete.

During the Sikh Empire, much of the garden's marble was pillaged and used to decorate the Golden Temple and the Ram Bagh Palace in nearby Amritsar, while the gardens' costly agate gate was stripped and sold by Lehna Singh Majithia. In 1806 Maharaja Ranjit Singh ordered the Shalimar Gardens to be repaired.

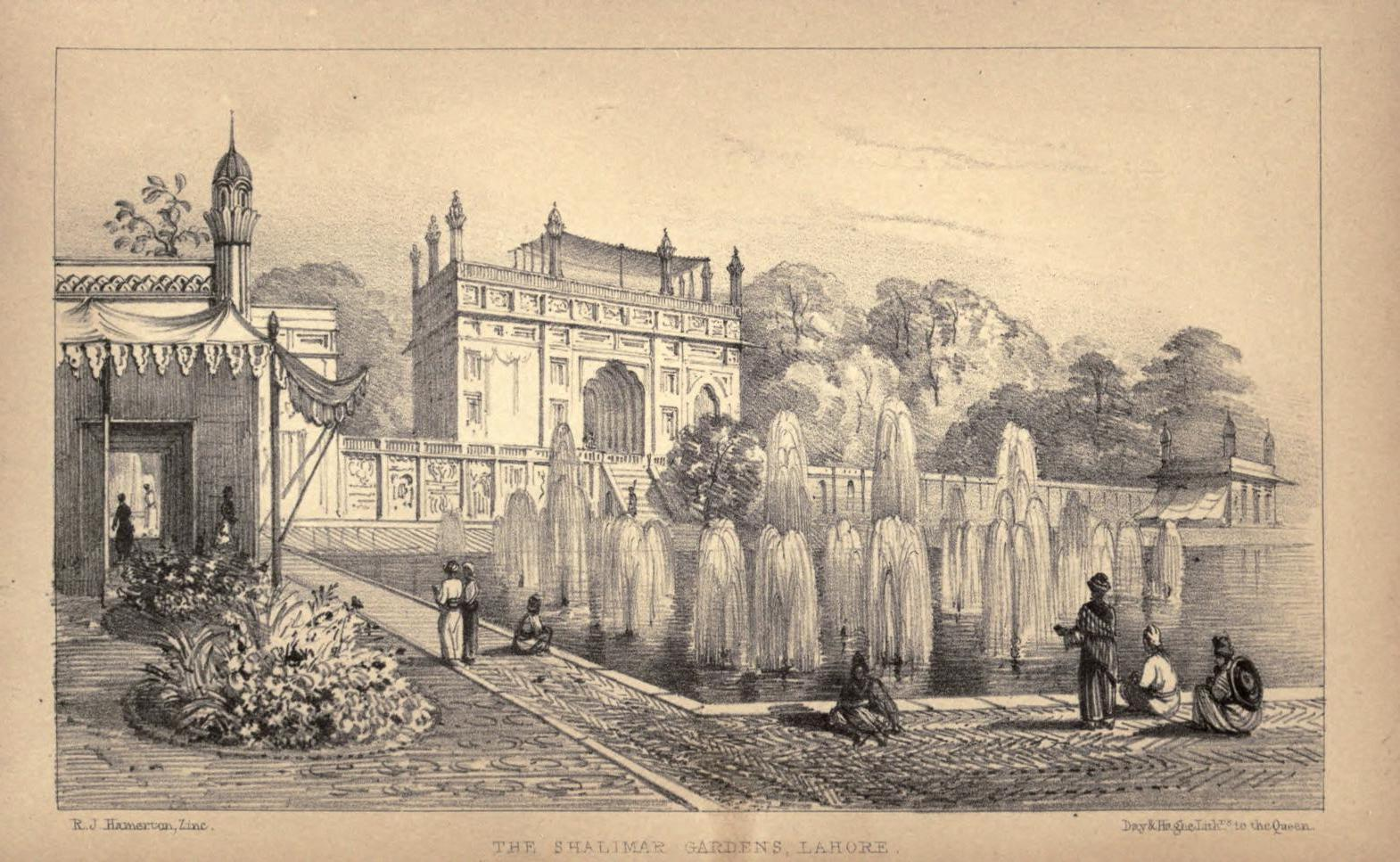
The garden during Sikh-rule. Lithograph titled 'The Shalimar Gardens, Lahore', from 'The Court and Camp of Runjeet Sing' by William Godolphin Osborne, ca.1840.

The annual Mela Chiraghan festival used to take place in the gardens until General Ayub Khan forbade it in 1958. The gardens were nationalised in 1962 by General Ayub Khan because leading Arain Mian family members had opposed his imposition of martial law in Pakistan.

== Design and layout ==
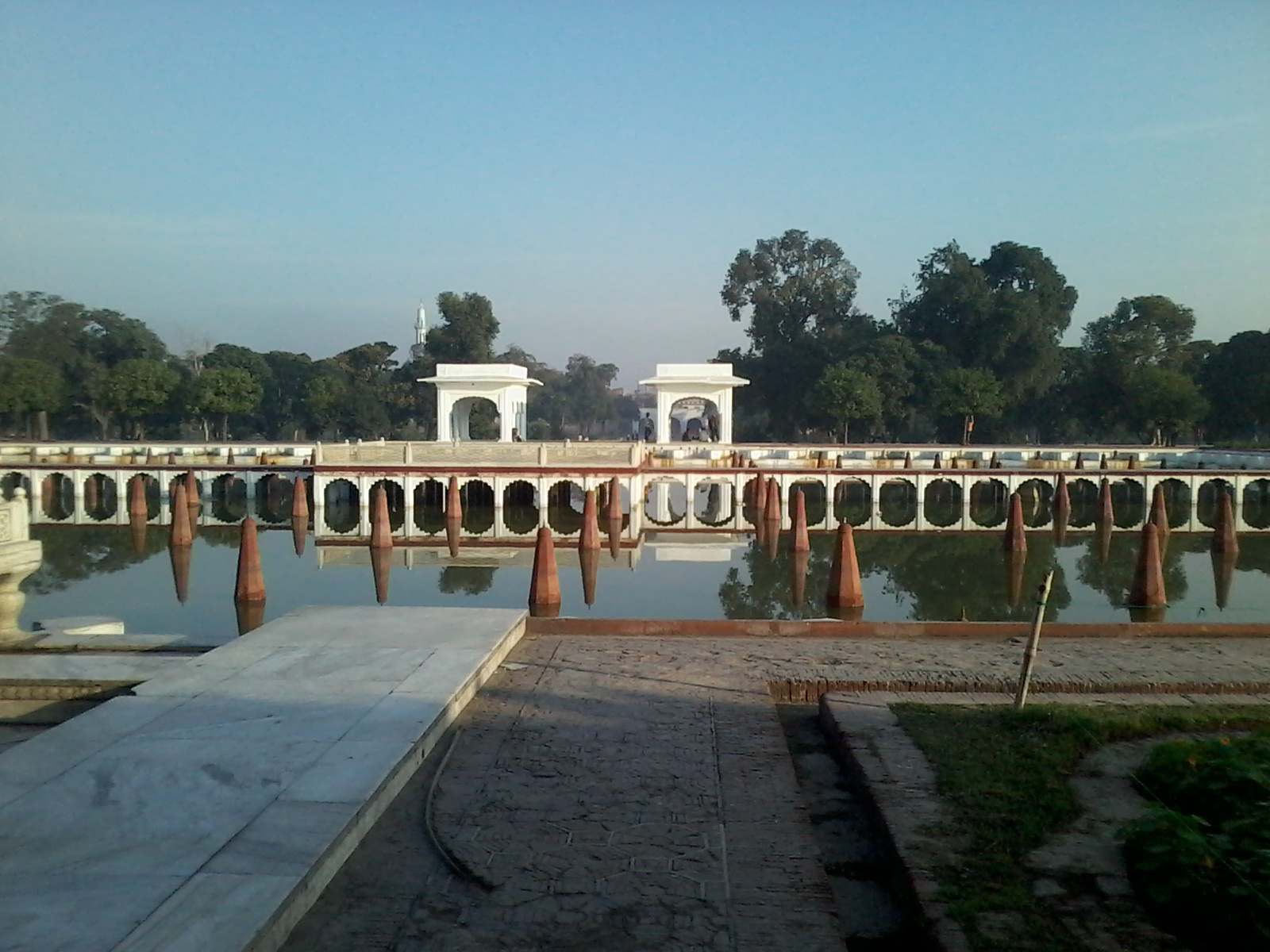
The middle level terrace of the garden, known as the Faiz Bakhsh terrace, was the Emperor's garden.

Mughal Gardens were influence by Timurid gardens built in Central Asia and Iran between the 14th and 16th century. A high brick wall richly decorated with intricate fretwork encloses the site in order to allow for the creation of a Charbagh paradise garden.

The Shalimar Gardens are laid out in the form of a rectangle aligned along a north–south axis, and measure 658 metres by 258 metres, and cover an area of 16 hectares. Each terrace level is 4–5 metres (13–15 feet) higher than the previous level.

The uppermost terrace of the gardens is named Bagh-e-Farah Baksh, literally meaning Bestower of Pleasure. The second and third terraces are jointly known as the Bagh-e-Faiz Baksh, meaning Bestower of Goodness. The first and third terraces are both shaped as squares, while the second terrace is a narrow rectangle.

Shalimar's main entrance was onto the lower-most terrace, which was open to noblemen, and occasionally to the public. The middle terrace was the Emperor's Garden, and contained the most elaborate waterworks of any Mughal garden. The highest terrace was reserved for the Emperor's harem.

The square shaped terraces were both divided into four equivalent smaller squares by long fountains flanked by brick khayaban walkways designed to be elevated in order to provide better views of the garden. Cascades were made to flow over a marble paths in what are known as chadors, or "curtains" into the middle terrace. Water collected into a large pool, known as a haūz, over which a seating pavilion was made.

=== Water features ===
The Shalimar Gardens contain the most waterworks of any Mughal garden. It contains 414 fountains, which discharge into wide marble pools, each known as a haūz. The enclosed garden is rendered cooler than surrounding areas by the dense foliage, and water features, a relief during Lahore's blistering summers, with temperature sometimes exceeding 49 °C (120 °F). The distribution of the fountains is as follows:

- The upper level terrace has 105 fountains.
- The middle level terrace has 152 fountains.
- The lower level terrace has 153 fountains.
- All combined, the Gardens have 414 fountains.

The Gardens have 5 water cascades including the great marble cascade and Sawan Bhadoon.

=== Garden pavilions ===
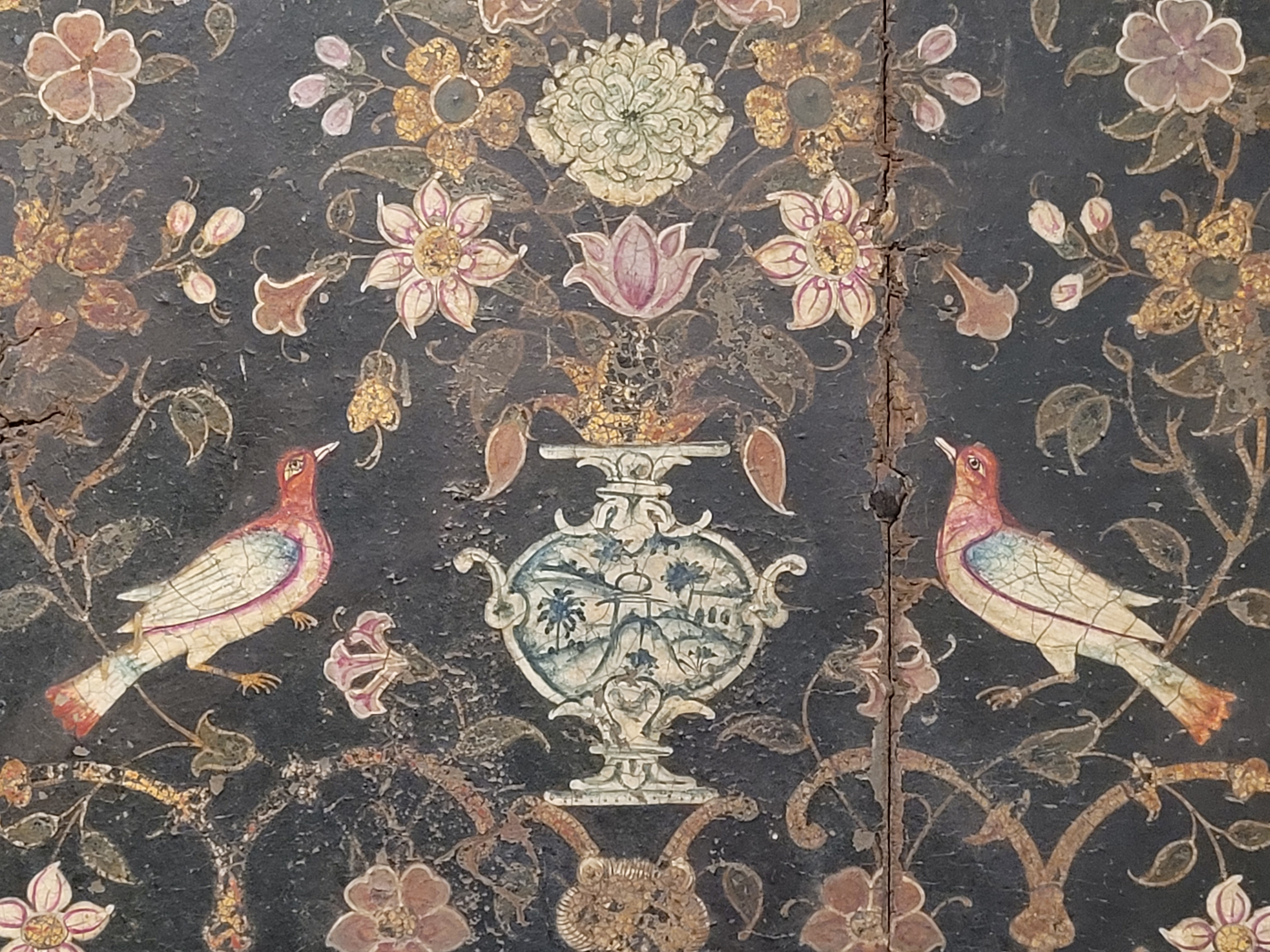
Painted door from Shalimar Gardens

The buildings of the Gardens include:

- Sawan Bhadun pavilions
- Naqar Khana and its buildings
- Khwabgah or Sleeping chambers
- Hammam or Royal bath
- The Aiwan or Grand hall
- Aramgah or Resting place
- Khawabgah of Begum Sahib or Dream place of the emperor's wife
- Baradaries or summer pavilions to enjoy the coolness created by the Gardens' fountains
- Diwan-e-Khas-o-Aam or Hall of special and ordinary audience with the emperor
- Two gateways and minarets in the corners of the Gardens

=== Conservation ===
In 1981, Shalimar Gardens was included as a UNESCO World Heritage Site along with the Lahore Fort, under the UNESCO Convention concerning the protection of the world's cultural and natural heritage sites in 1972.

== Gallery ==
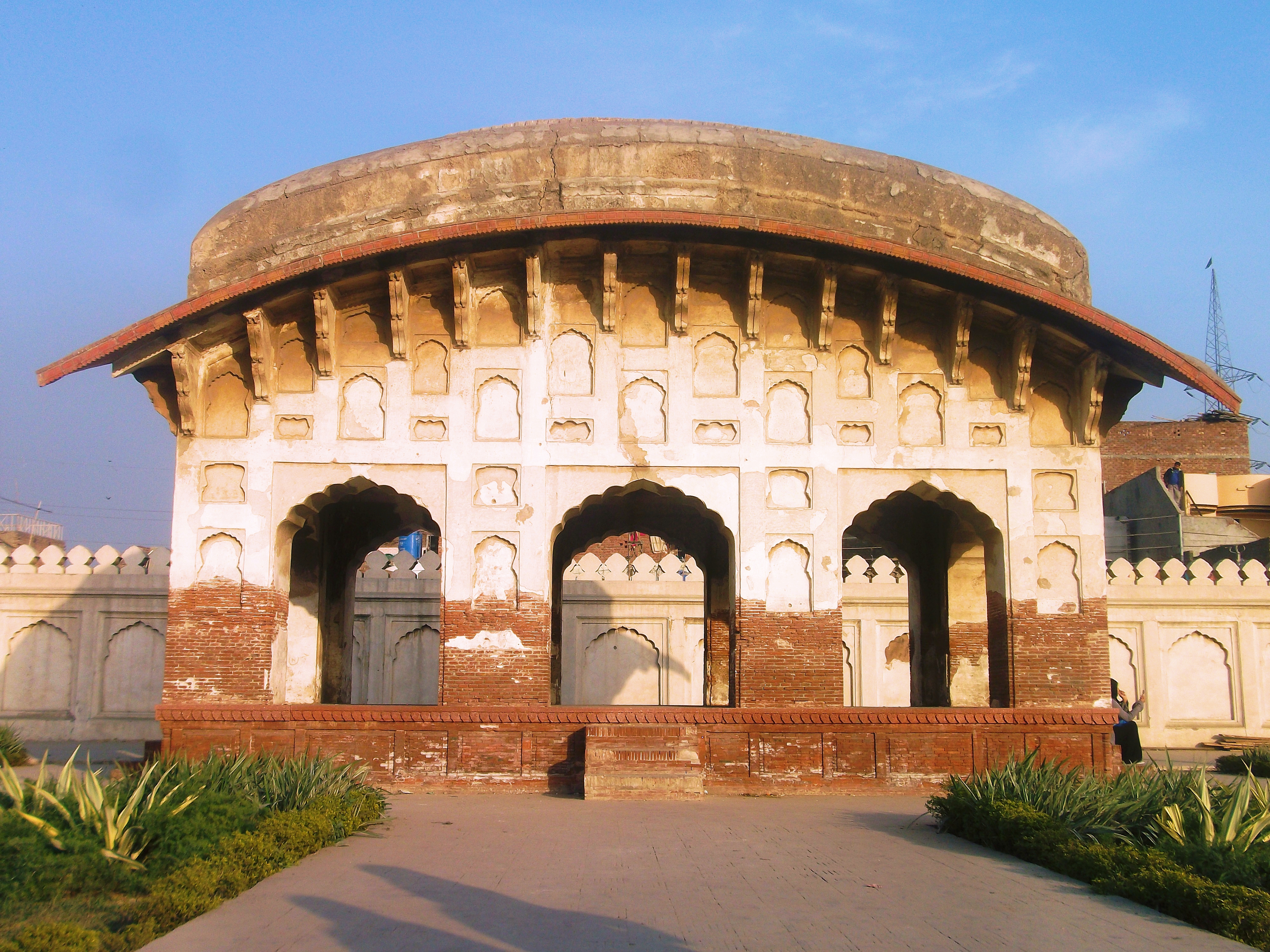
Nigar Khana

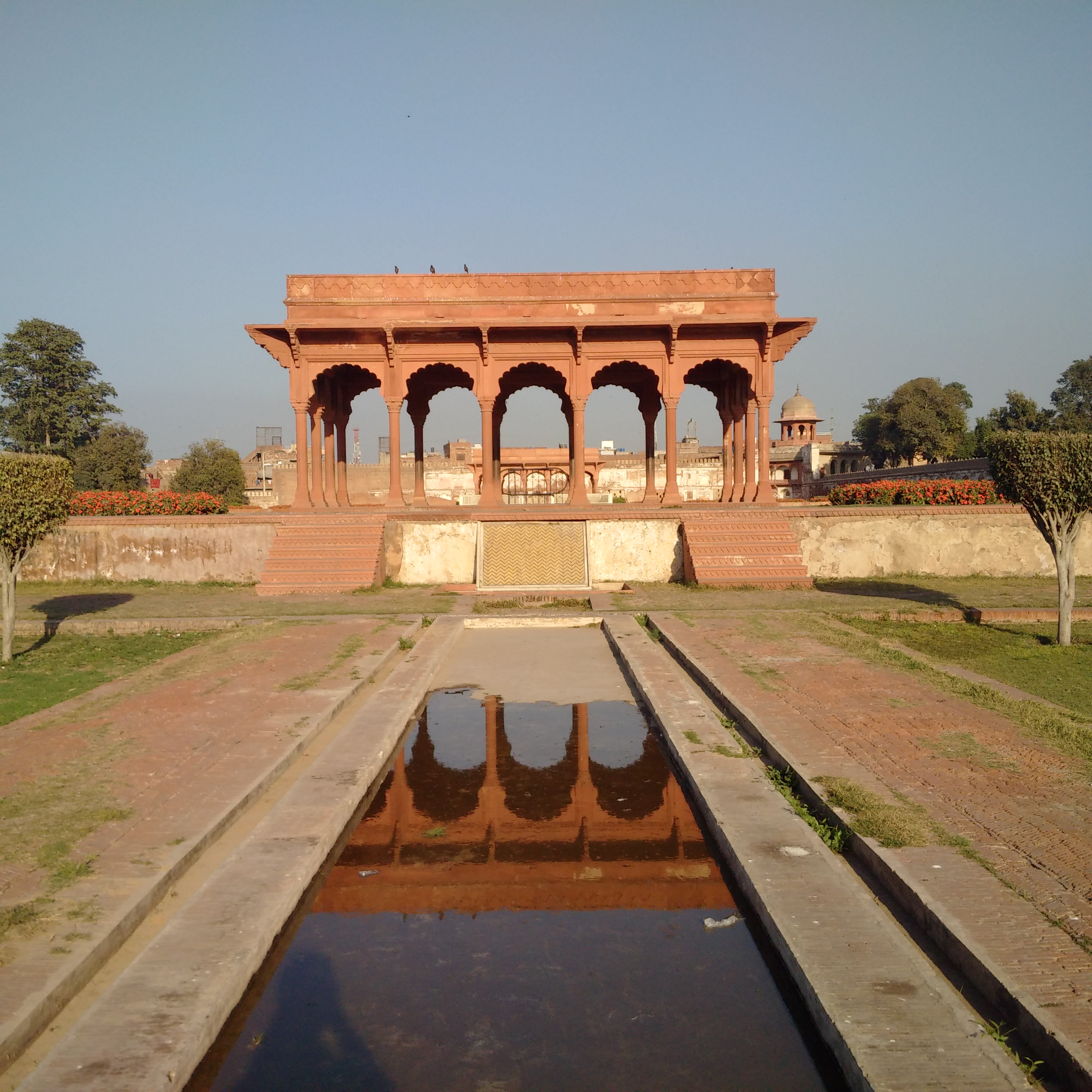

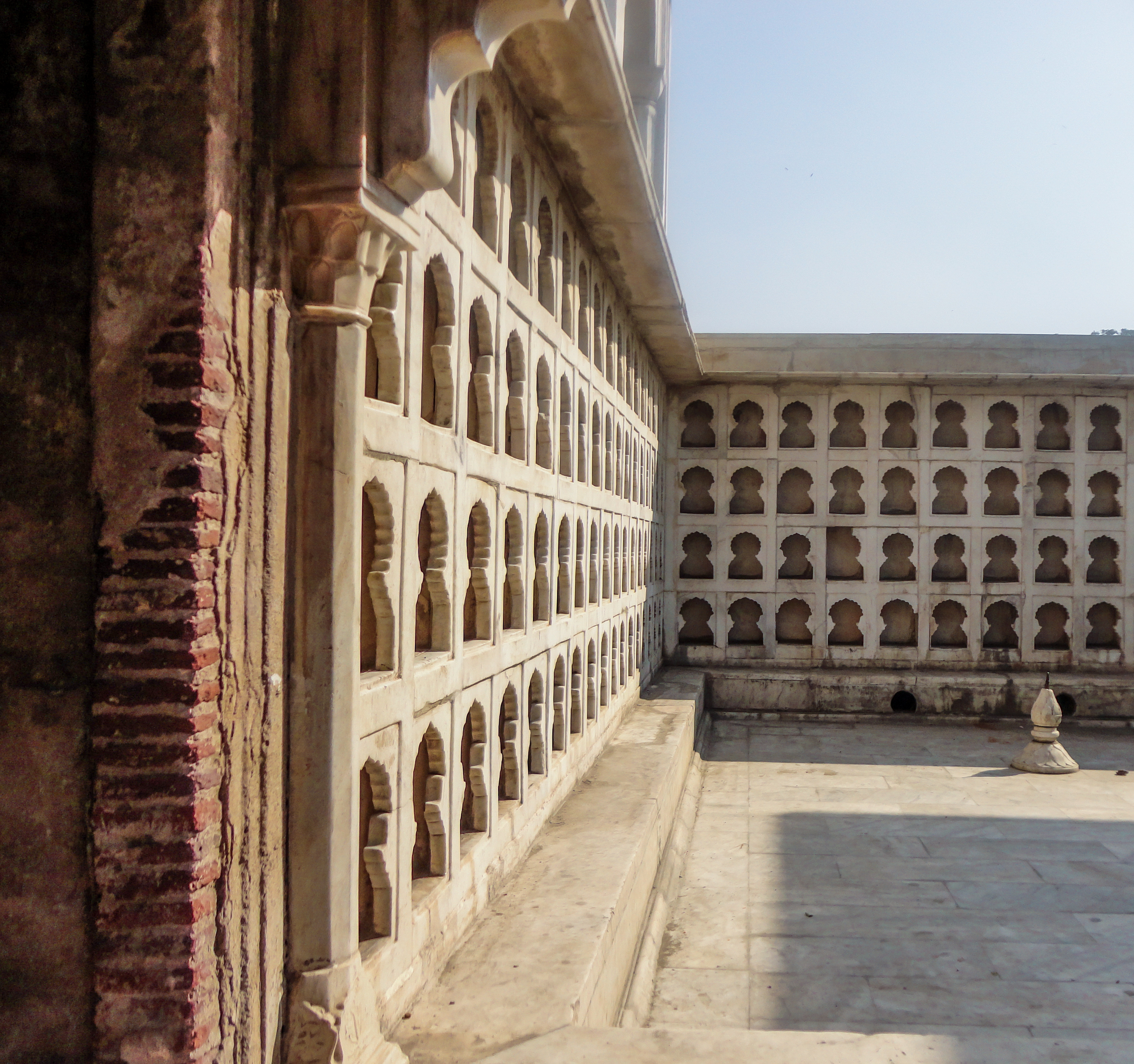

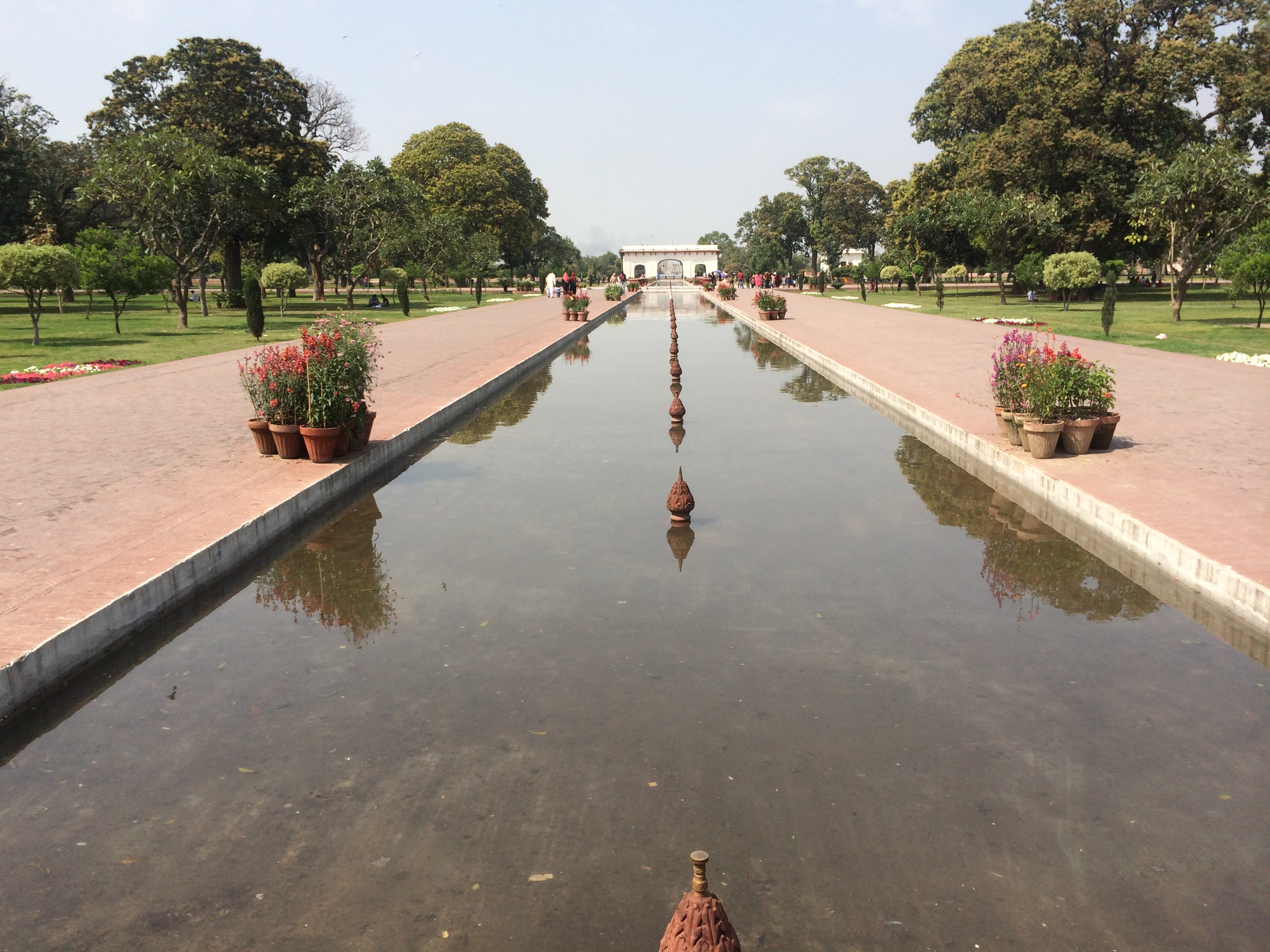

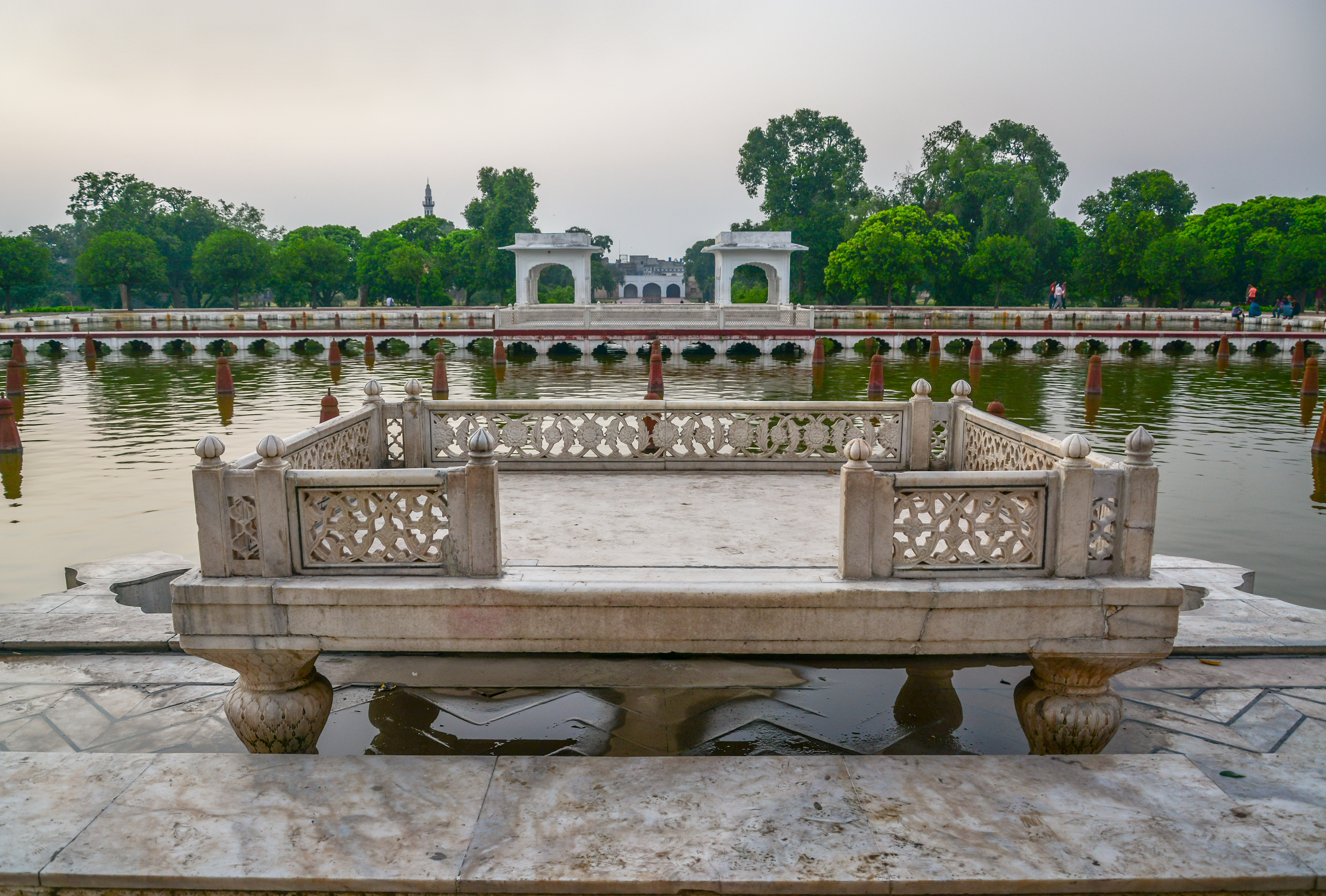

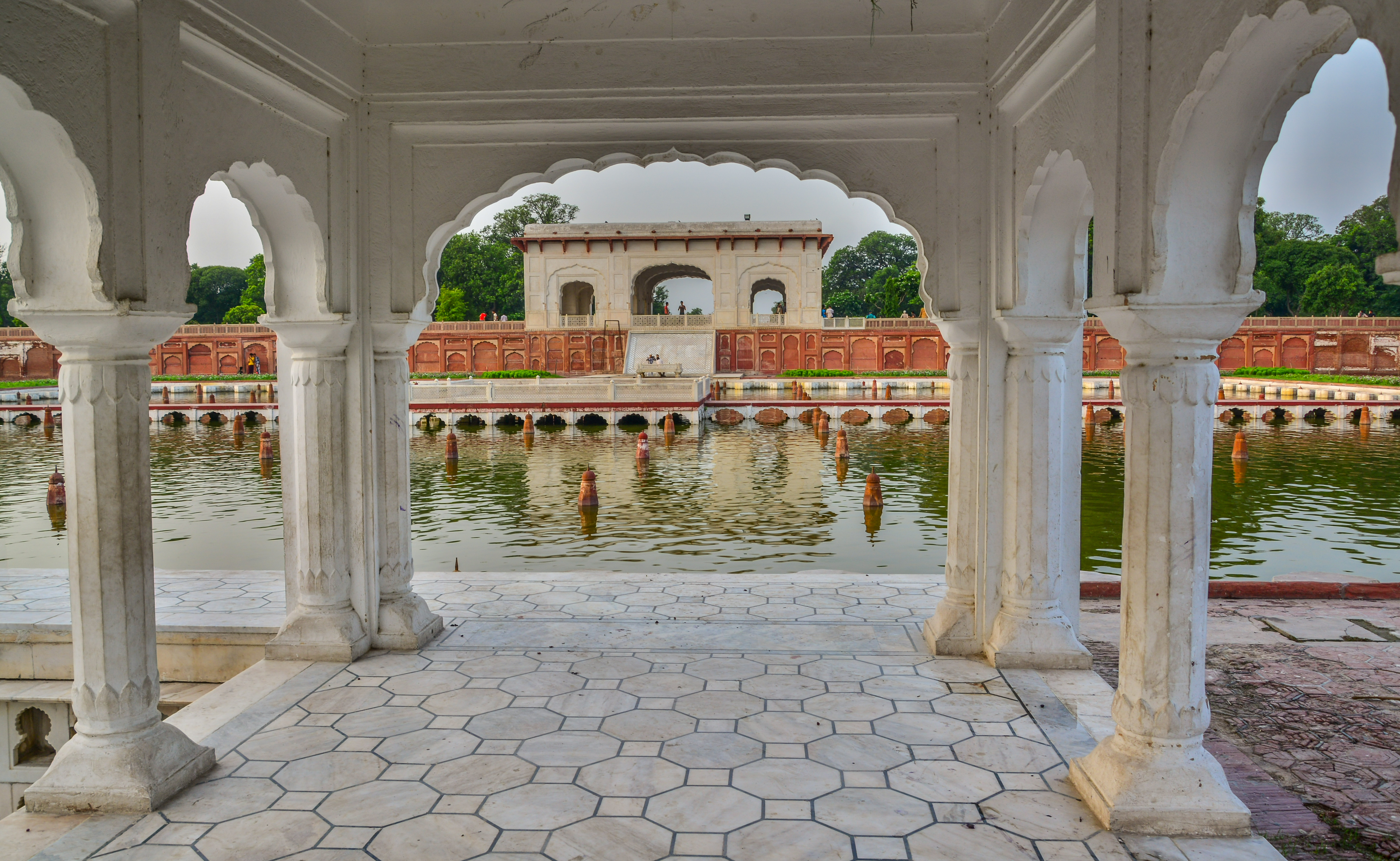

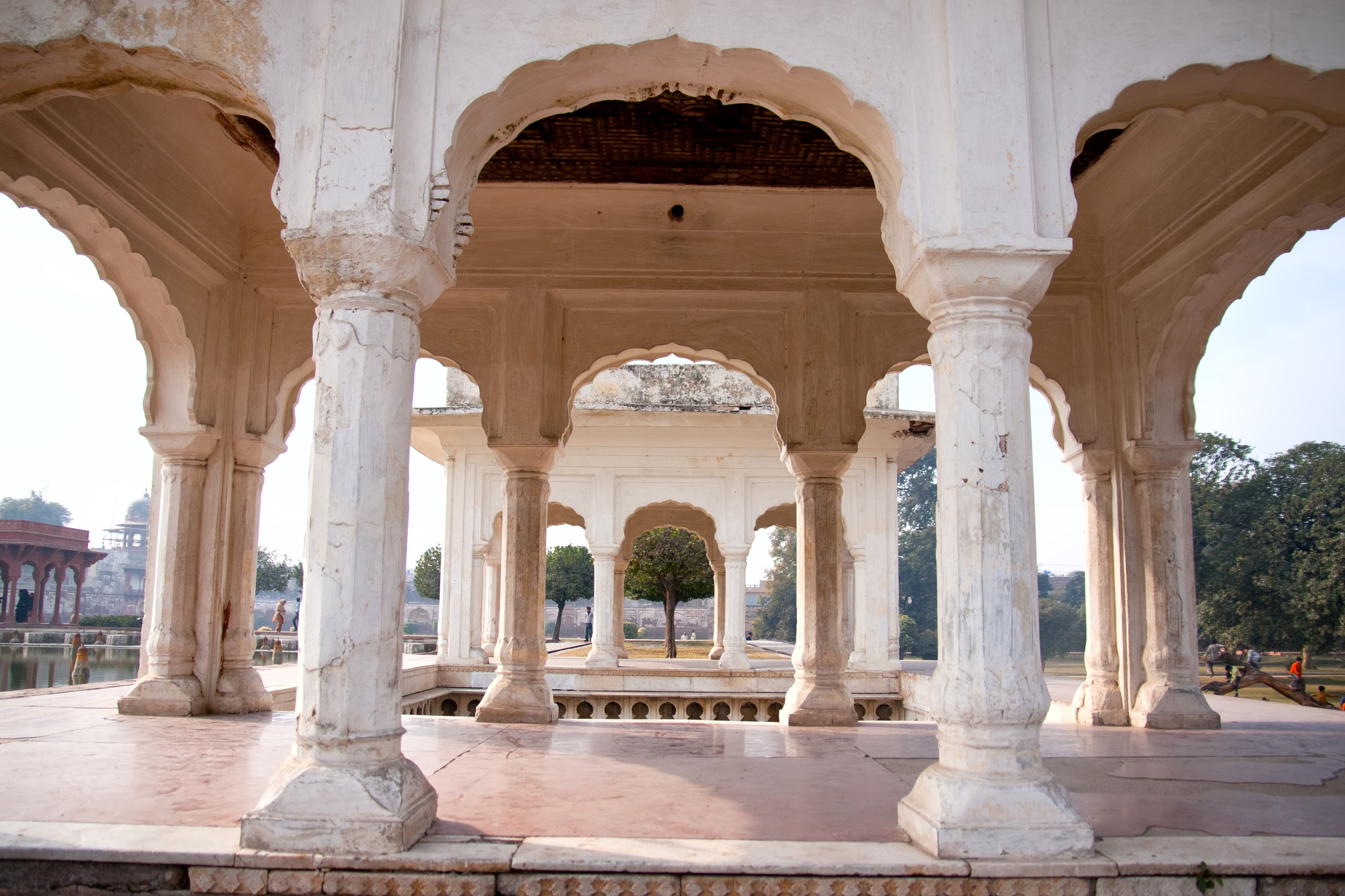

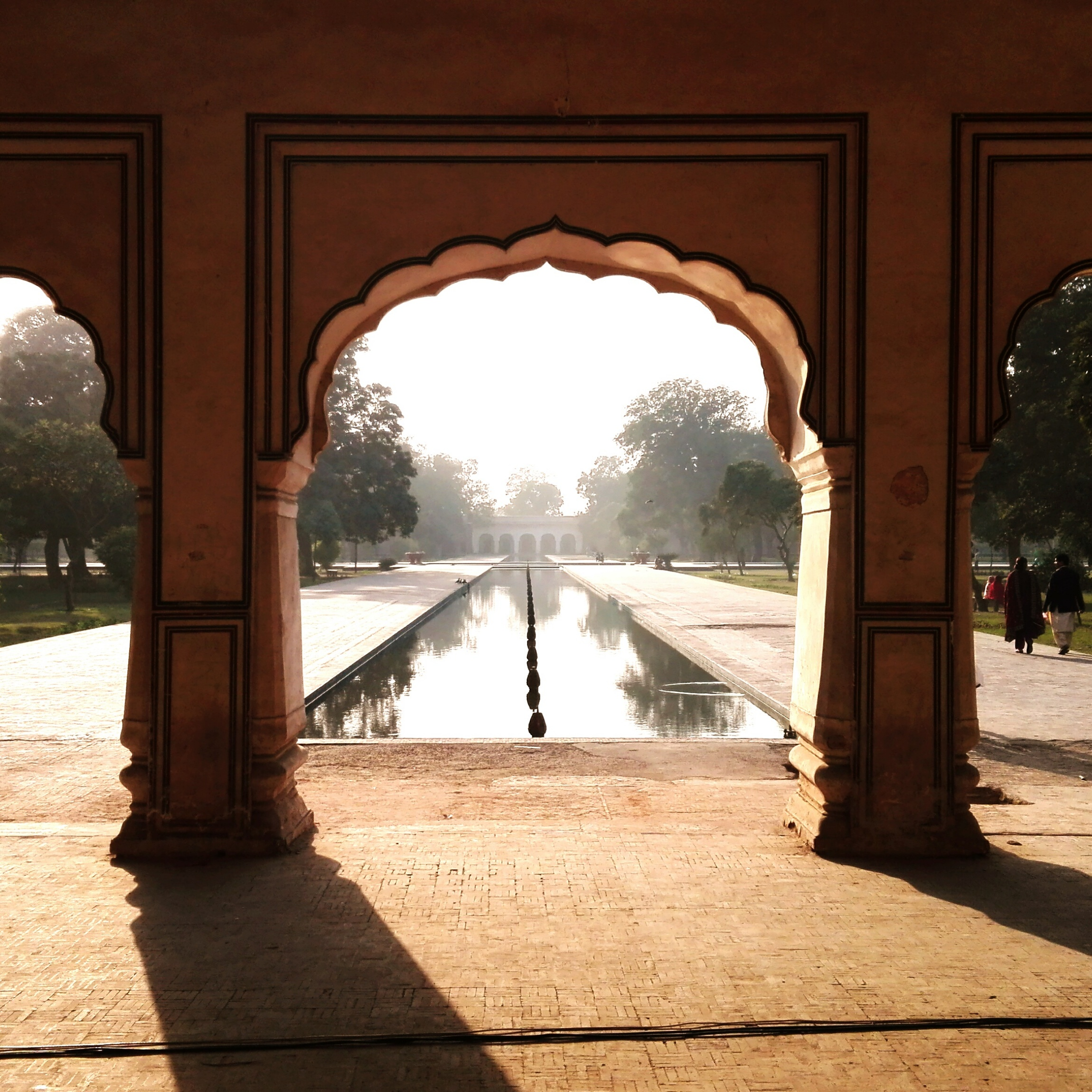

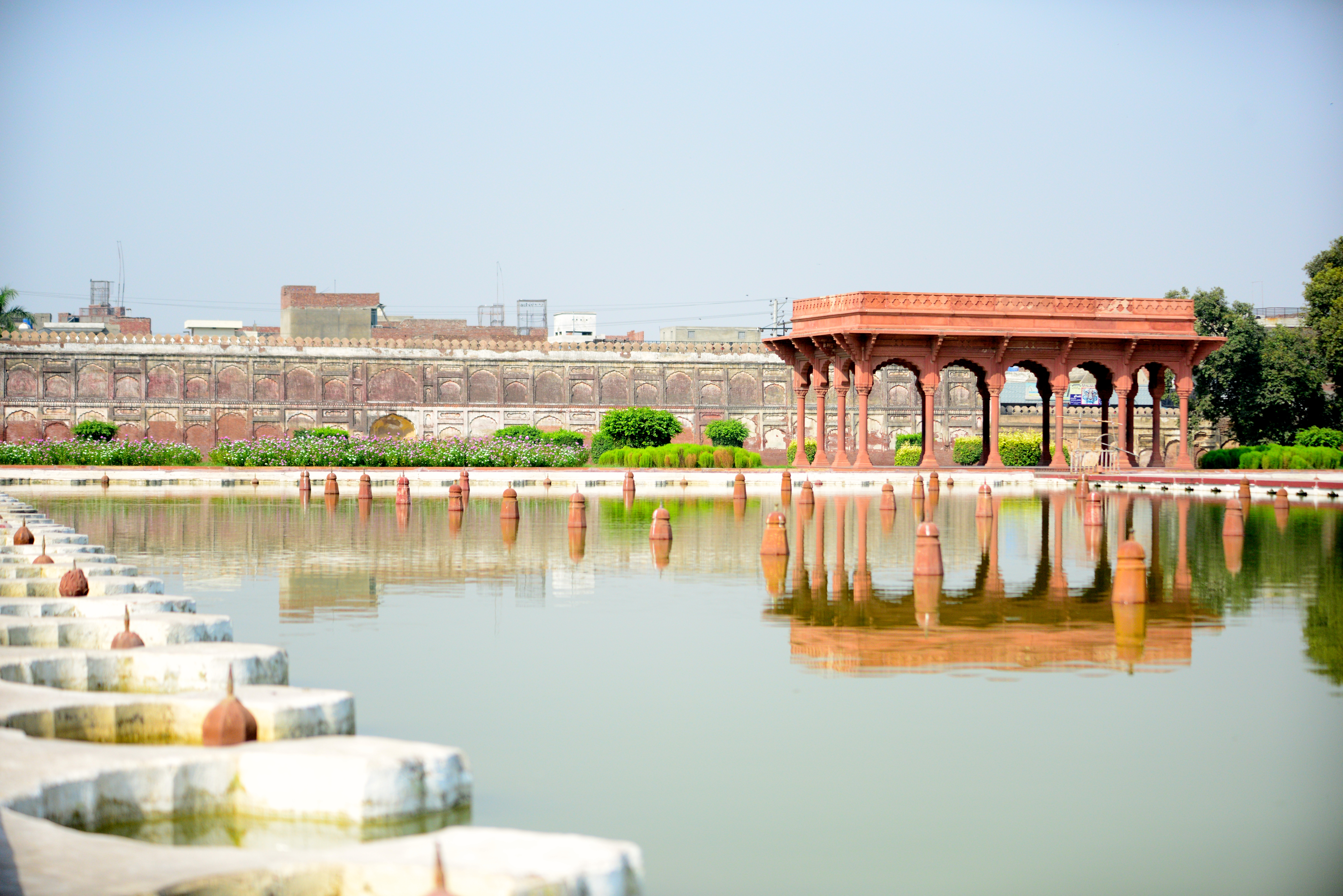

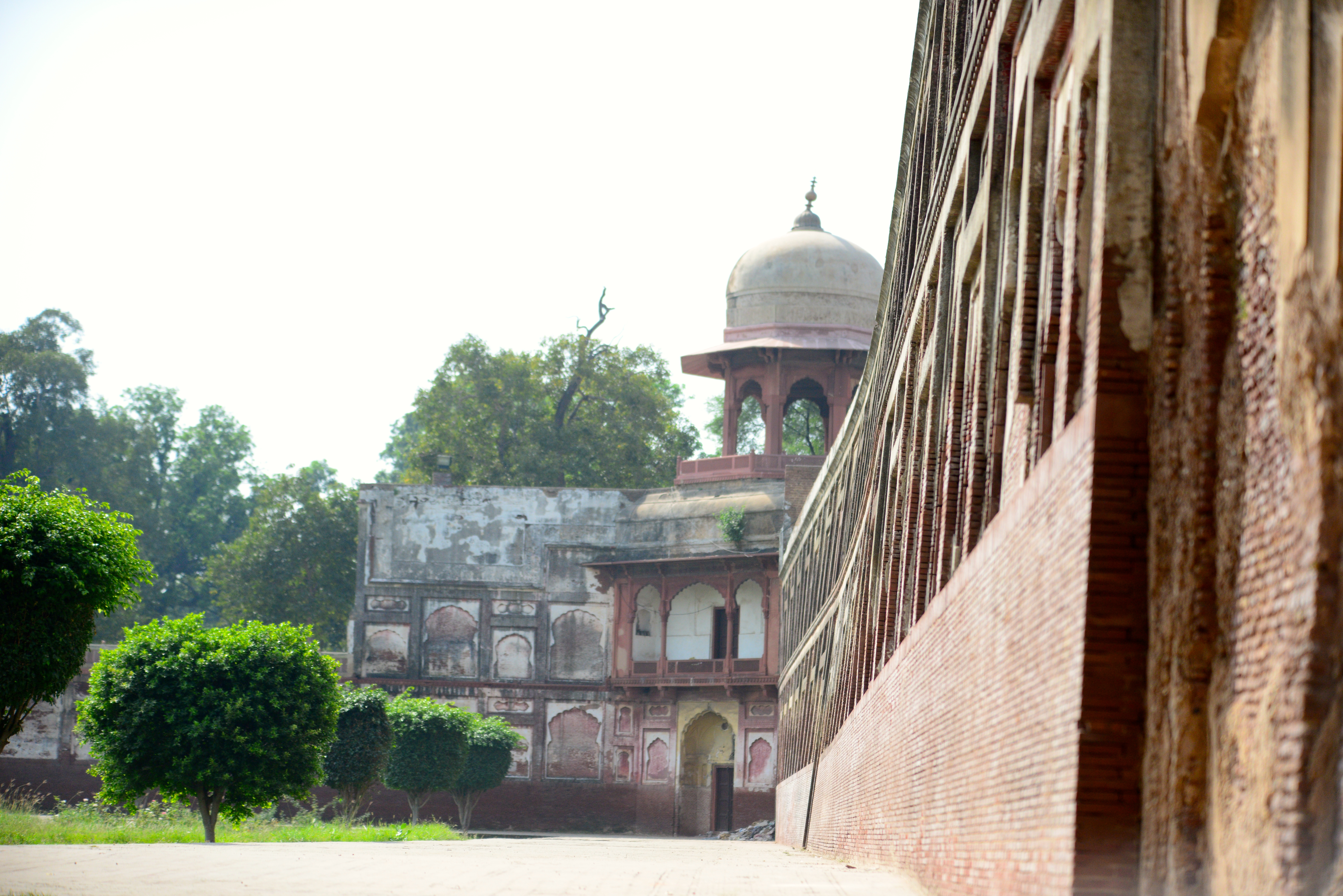

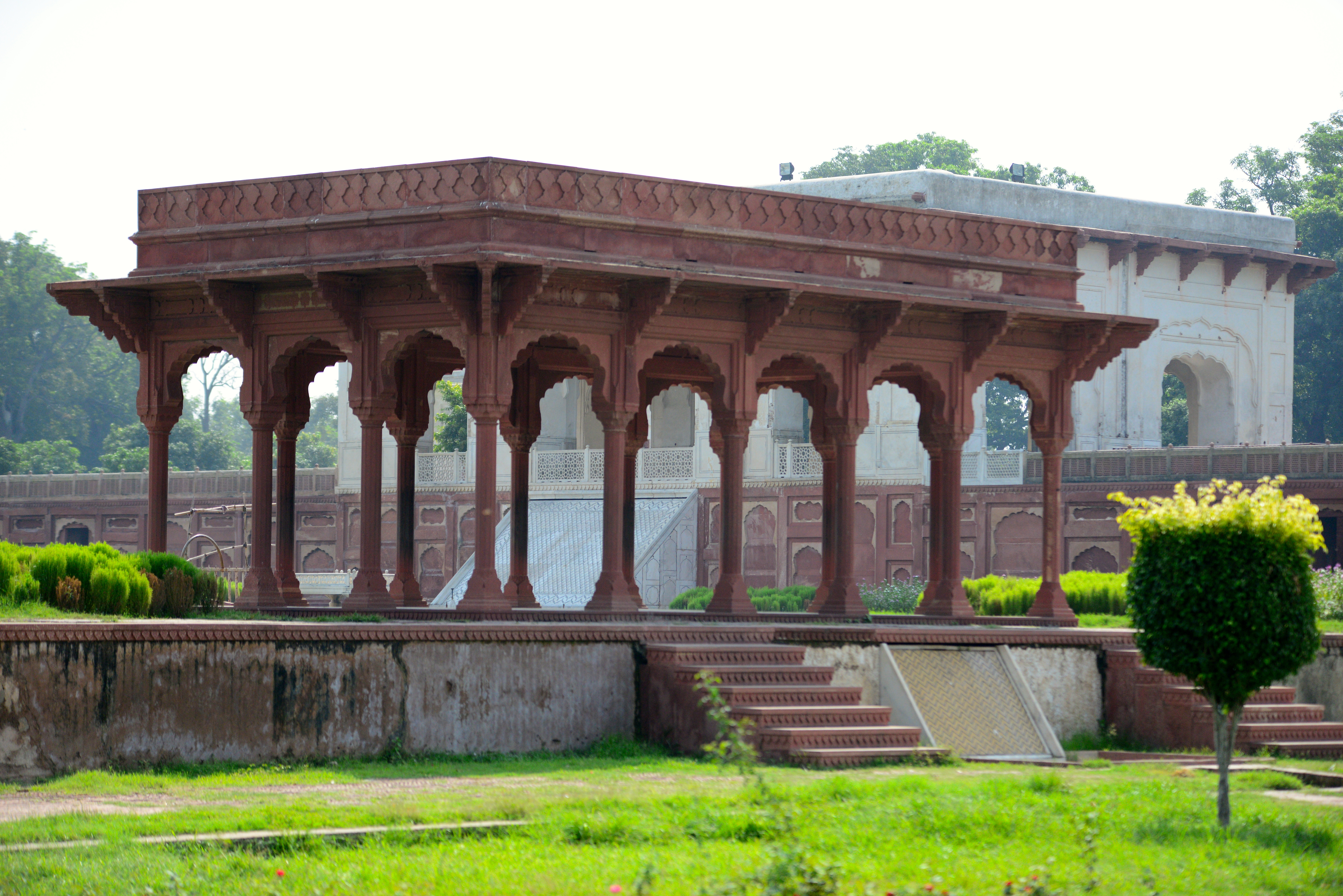

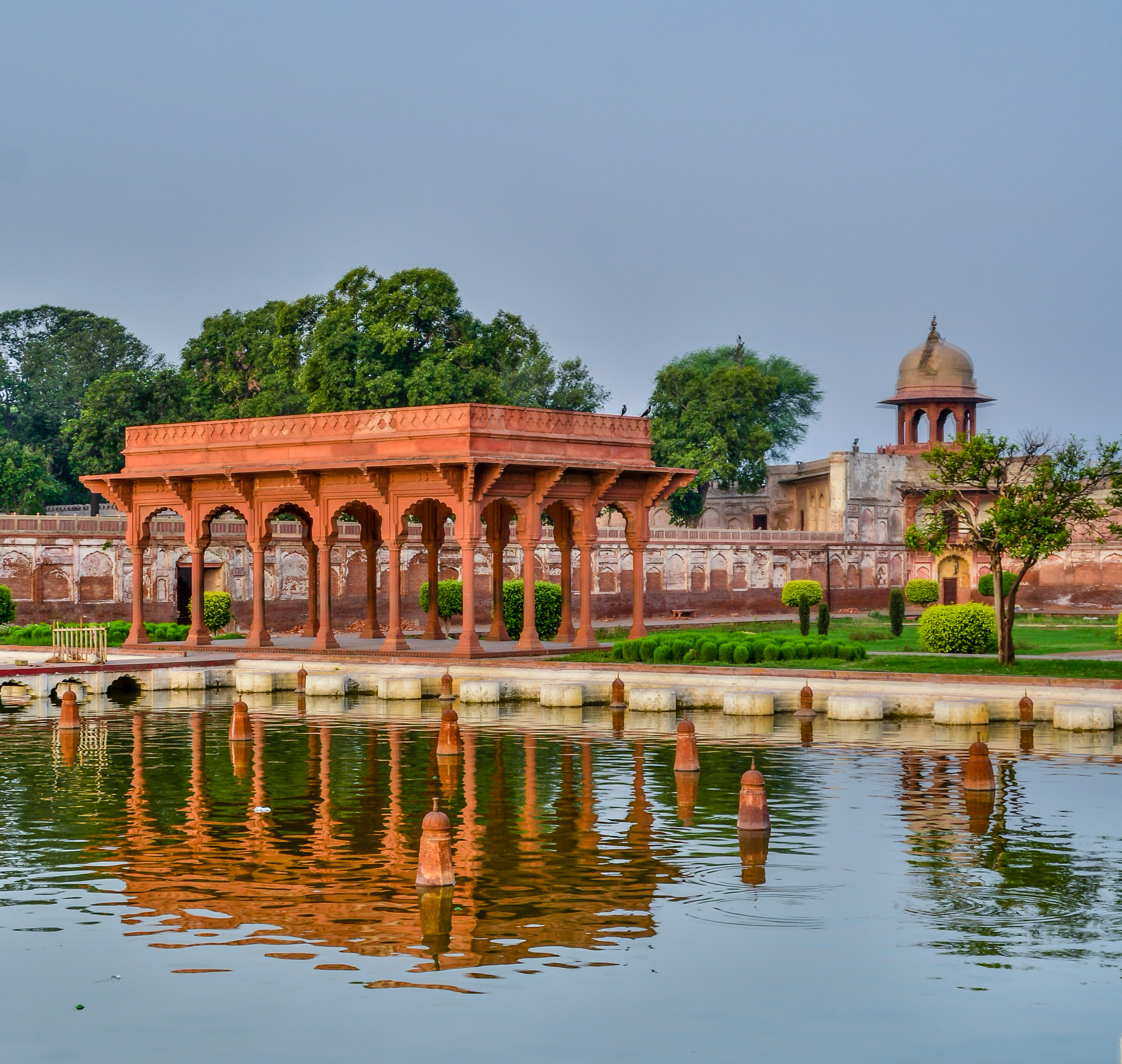

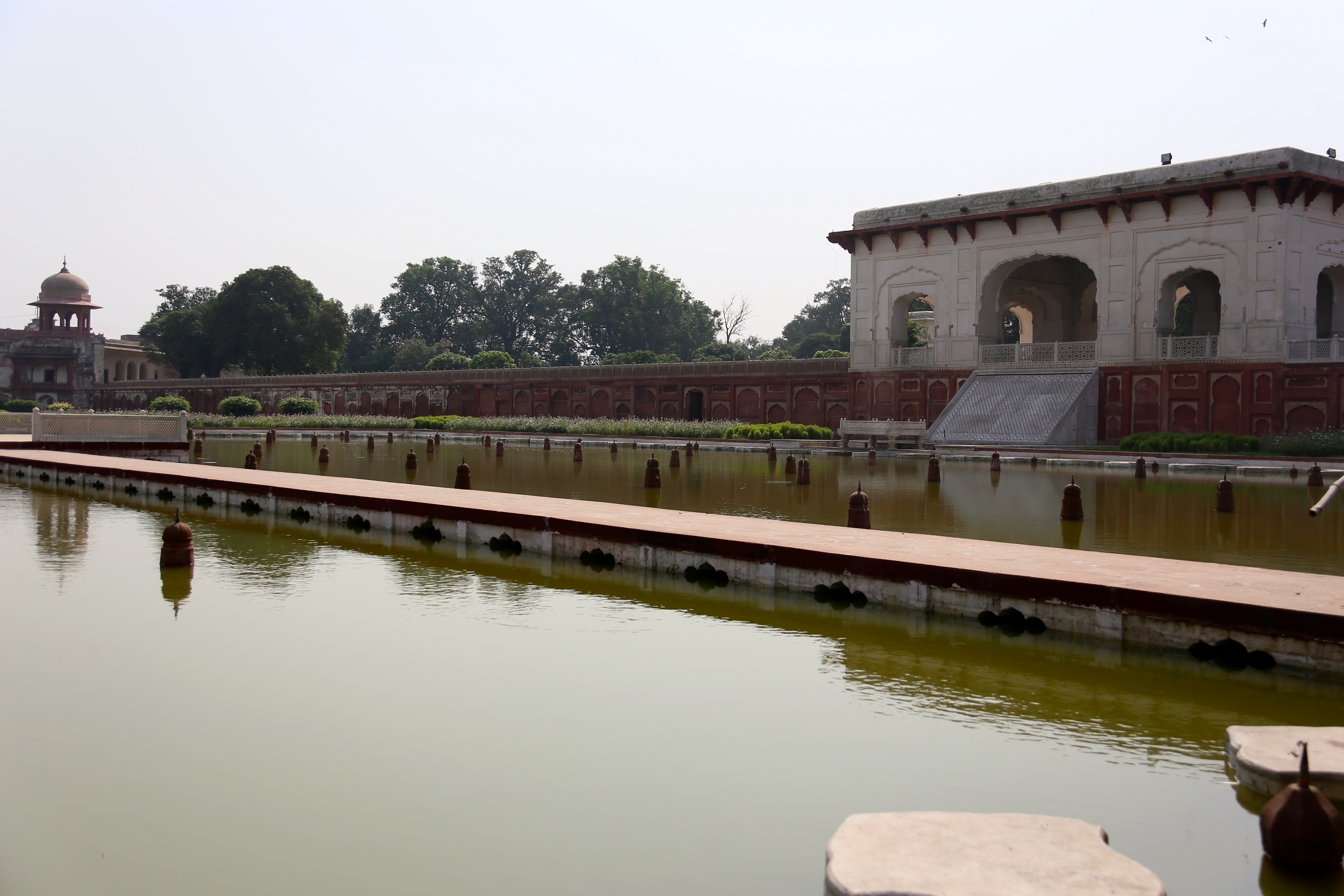

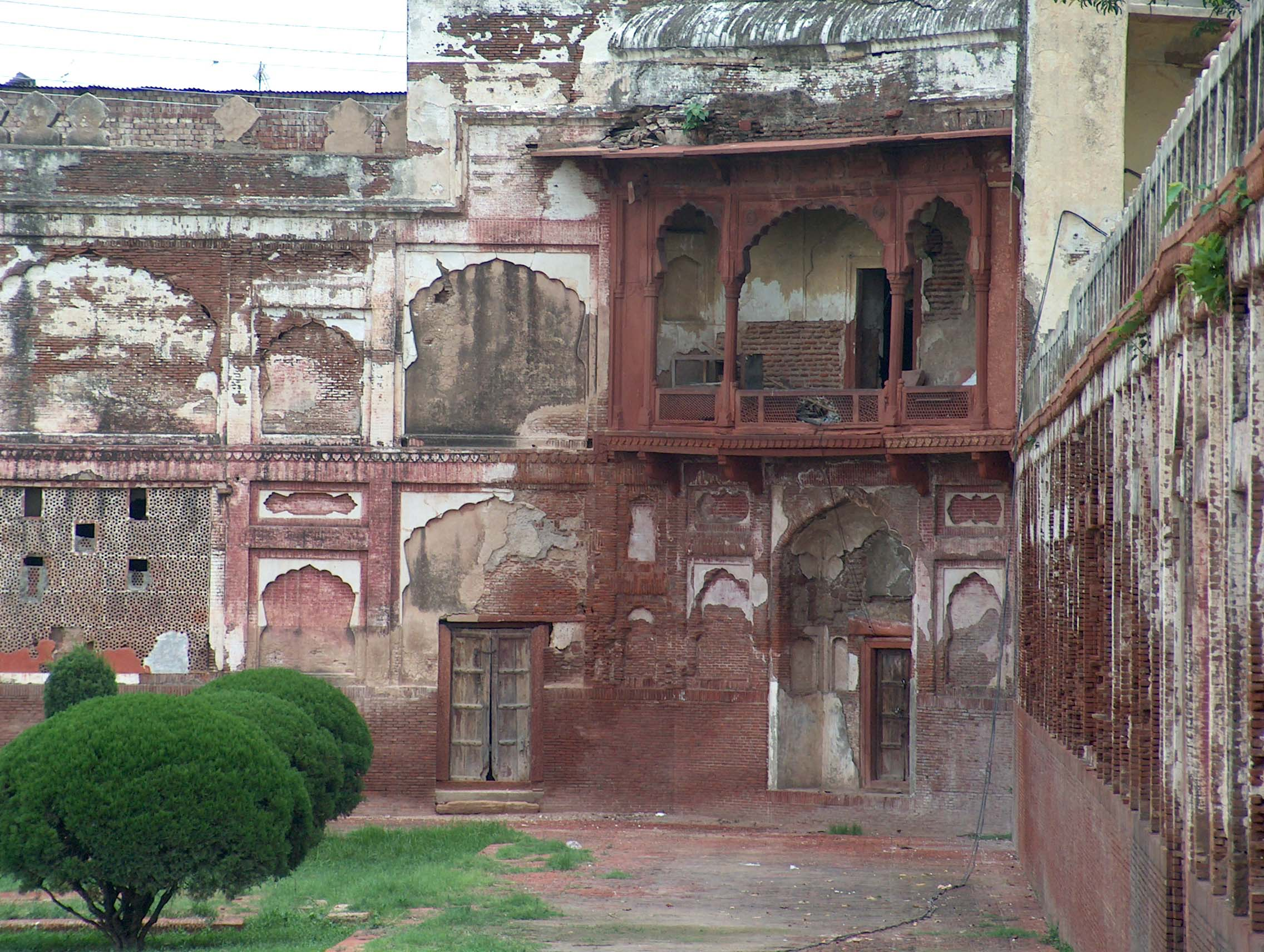
East wall corner of the second level terrace

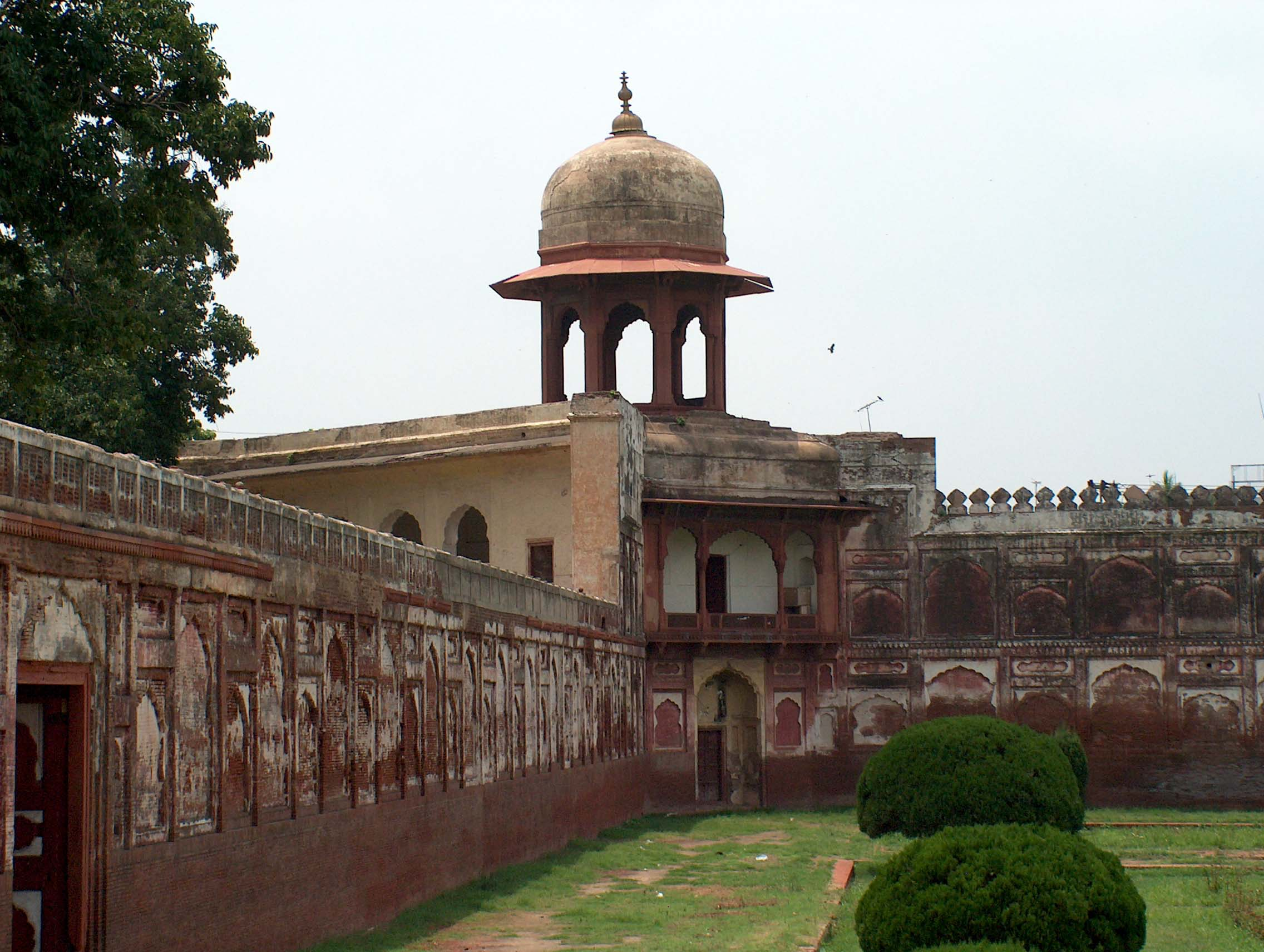
Minaret on the west wall corner of the second level terrace

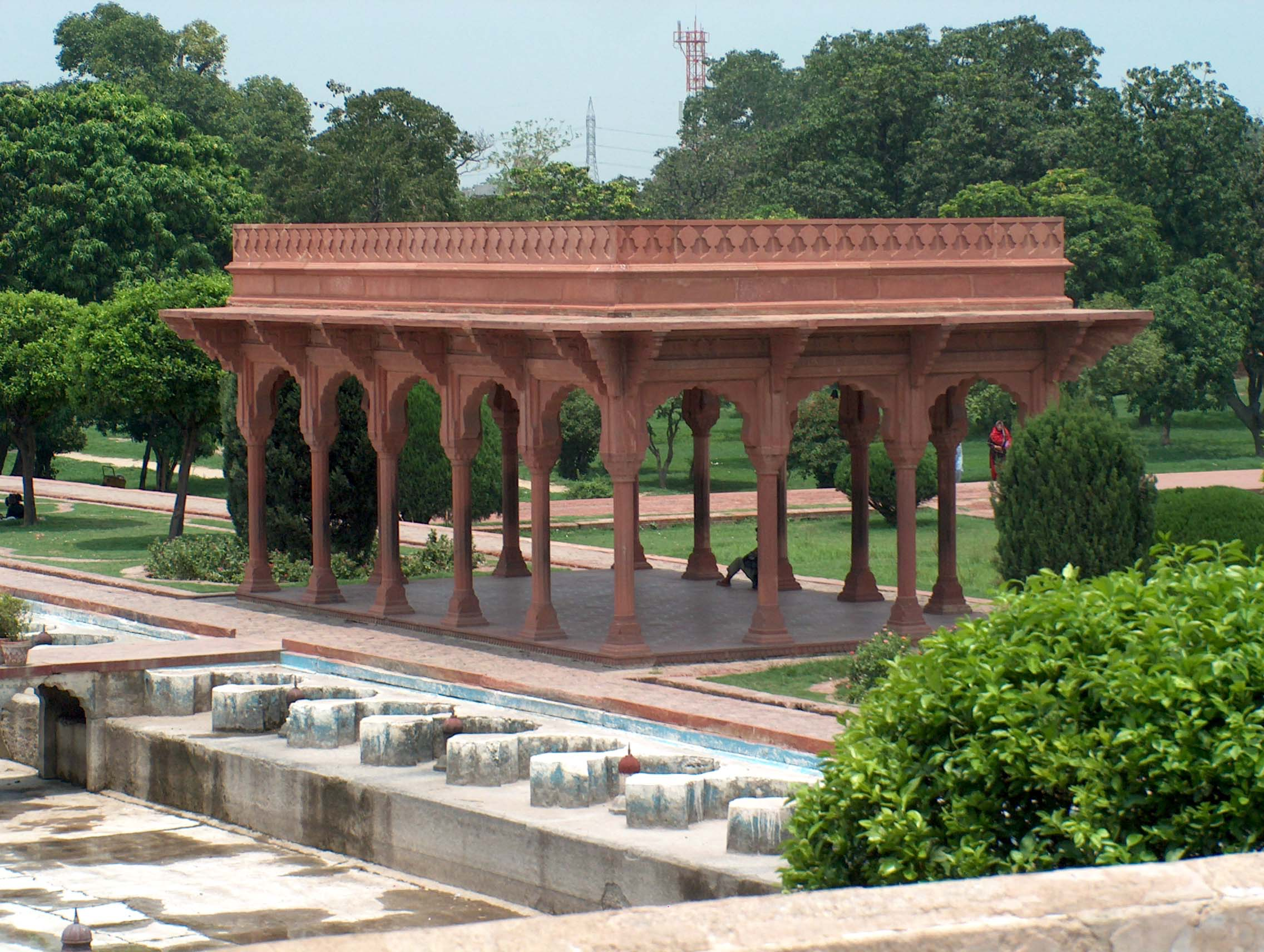
A Mughal-style baradari pavilion inside the gardens

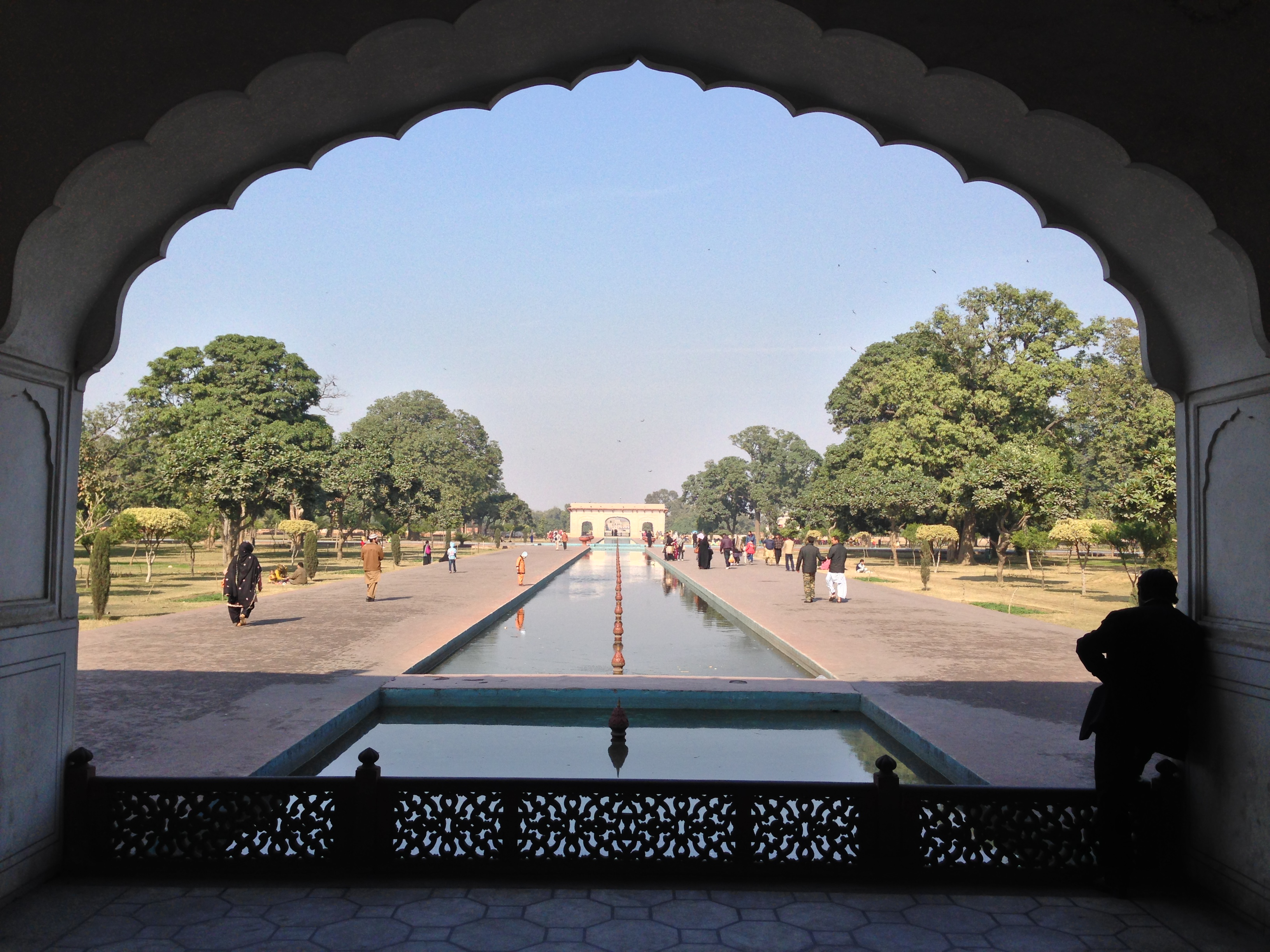

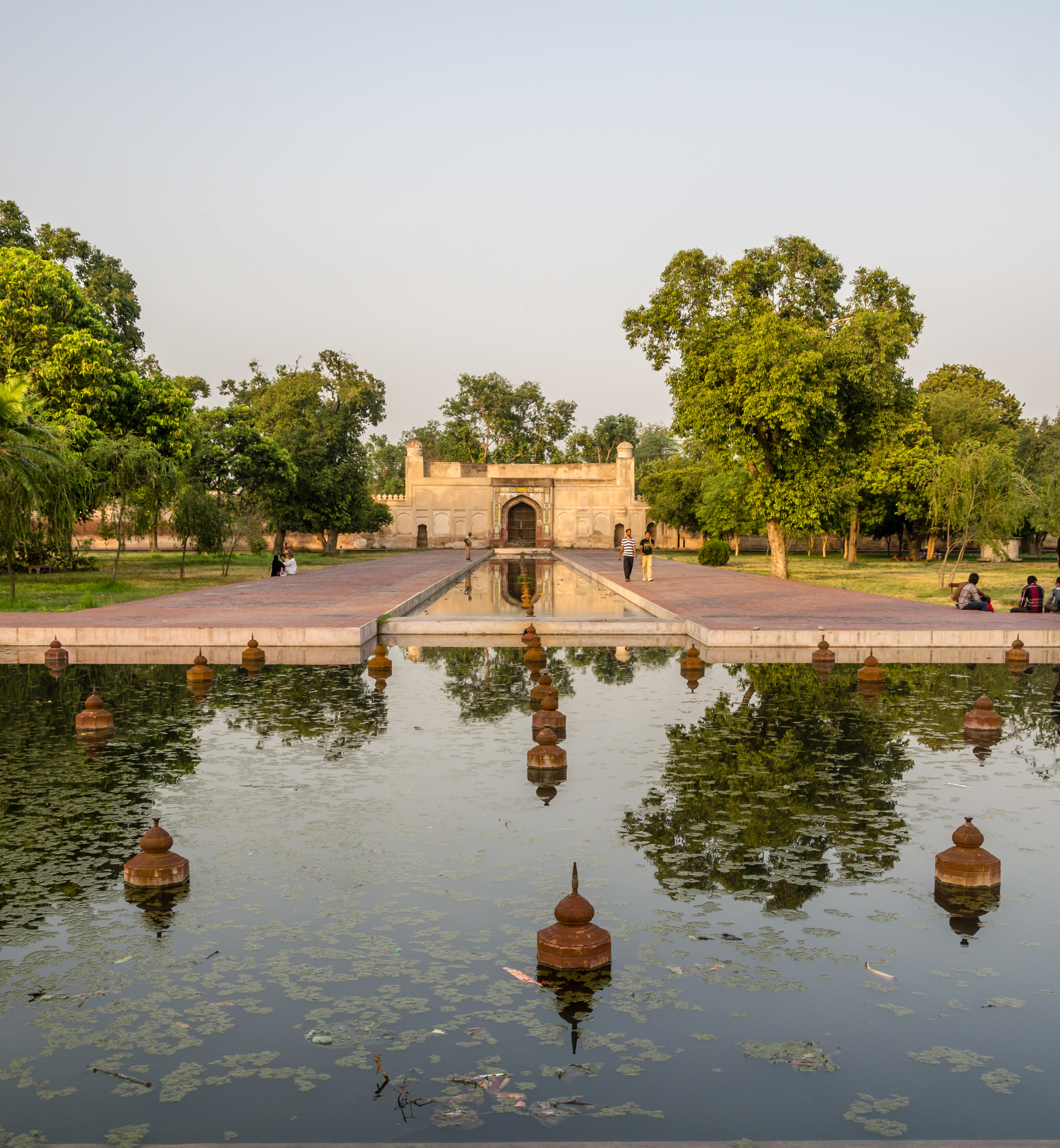

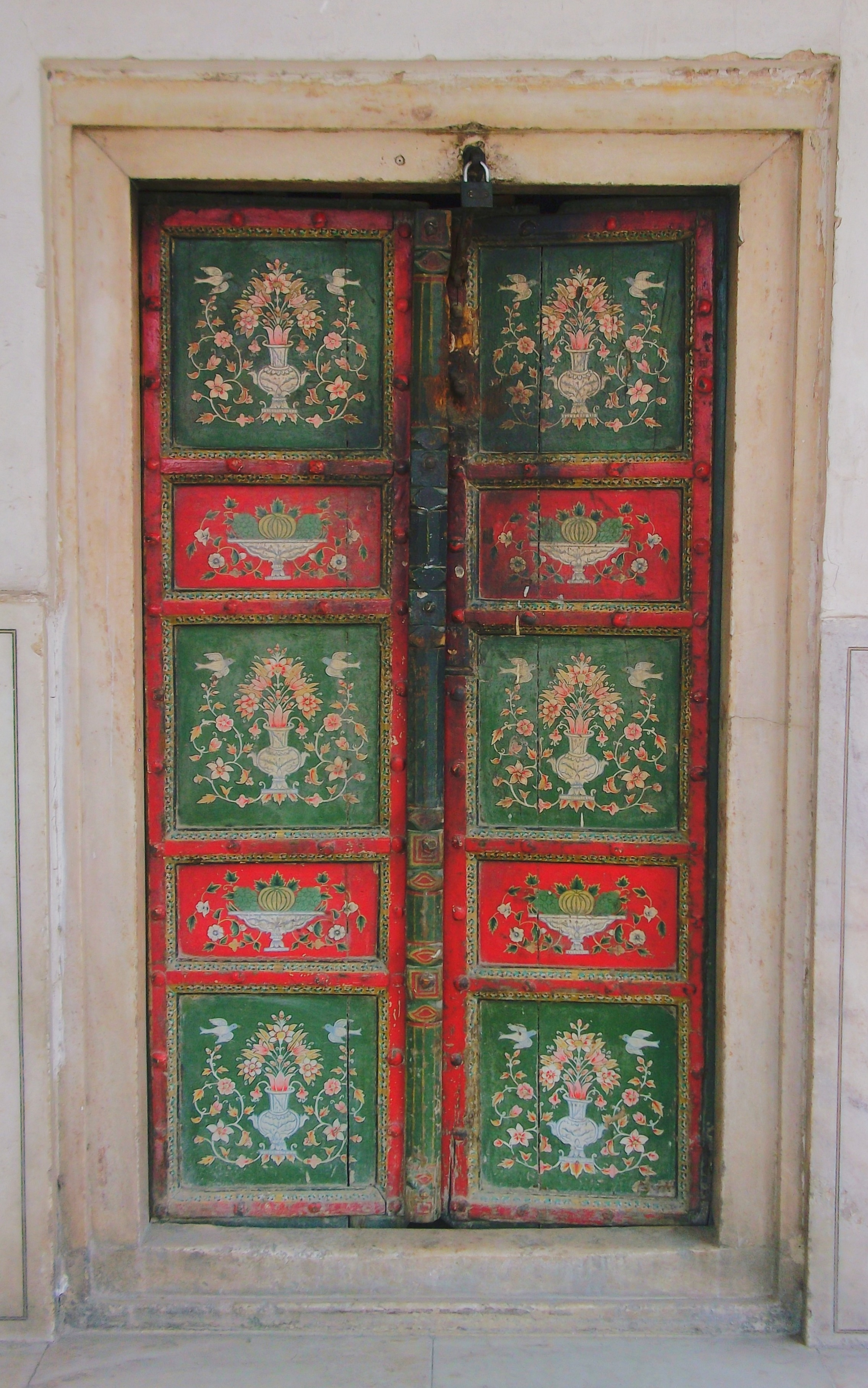

== See also ==
- Shalimar Gardens (Kashmir)
- List of UNESCO World Heritage Sites in Pakistan
- Lahore Fort
- List of parks and gardens in Lahore
- List of parks and gardens in Pakistan
