= Dai Anga Mosque =

Mosque in Lahore, Punjab, Pakistan

- دائی انگہ مسجد
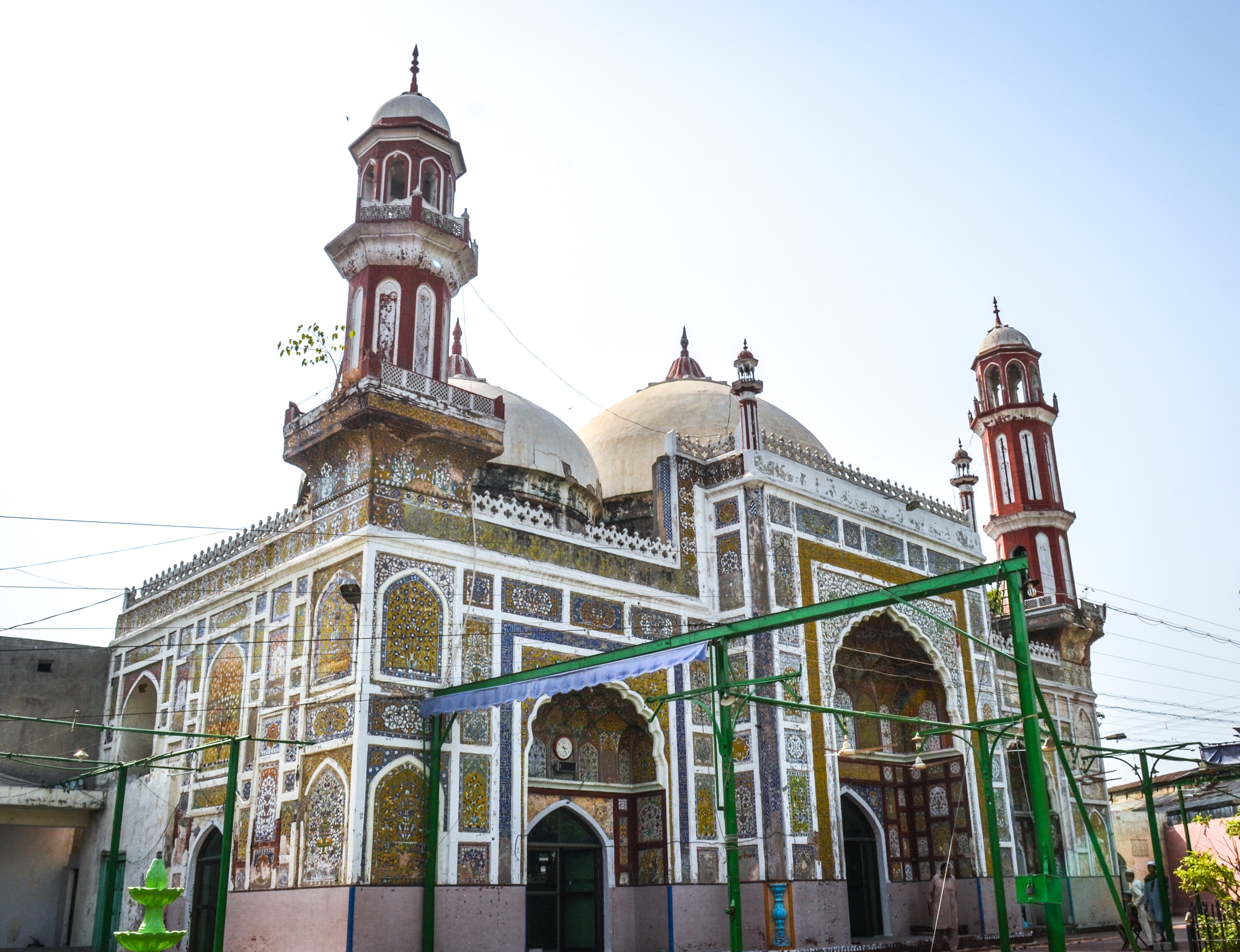
- The 17th century Dai Anga mosque's exterior is richly decorated with qashani tile work

- Location within Punjab, Pakistan

Religion
- Affiliation: Islam
- Branch/tradition: Sunni

Location
- Location: Lahore, Punjab, Pakistan
- Coordinates: 31°34′30″N 74°20′21″E

Architecture
- Type: mosque
- Style: Indo-Islamic, Mughal
- Completed: 1635 or 1639 C.E.

Specifications
- Dome: 3
- Dome dia. (outer): 16 feet
- Dome dia. (inner): 19 feet
- Minaret: 4
- Materials: brick, marble

Dai Anga Mosque (Urdu: دائی انگہ مسجد) is a mosque situated to the southeast of the Lahore Railway Station, in the city of Lahore in Pakistan's Punjab province. The mosque is said to have been built in 1635 in honour of the wetnurse of the Mughal Emperor Shah Jahan, Dai Anga.

== Background ==
Born as Zeb-un-Nisa, Dai Anga was well respected in the royal family. The mosque was said to be commissioned by her, and built prior to her departure for the Hajj. Her family was closely associated with the Mughal empire. Her husband Murad Khan served Emperor Jahangir as Magistrate of Bikaner, and her son Muhammad Rashid Khan was the best archer in the kingdom, and died fighting in the service of Shah Jahan's eldest son Dara Shikoh. The Tomb of Dai Anga is known as the "Gulabi Bagh," and is also located in Lahore.

== History ==
The mosque was said to have been built in 1635, however, the inscriptions in the mosque date it to 1649. The mosque also bears inscriptions that refer to its construction being supervised by a certain Maqbul, whose identity is uncertain. After Ranjit Singh came to power, the mosque was used as a gunpowder magazine. Following the British annexation of Punjab in 1849, the mosque was converted into a private residence for Henry Cope, editor of the Lahore Chronicle. Cope then sold it to the Punjab and Delhi Railway Company, under whom the building was used as an office for the railway traffic superintendent. In 1903, the building was reclaimed as a mosque and conserved.

== Architecture ==
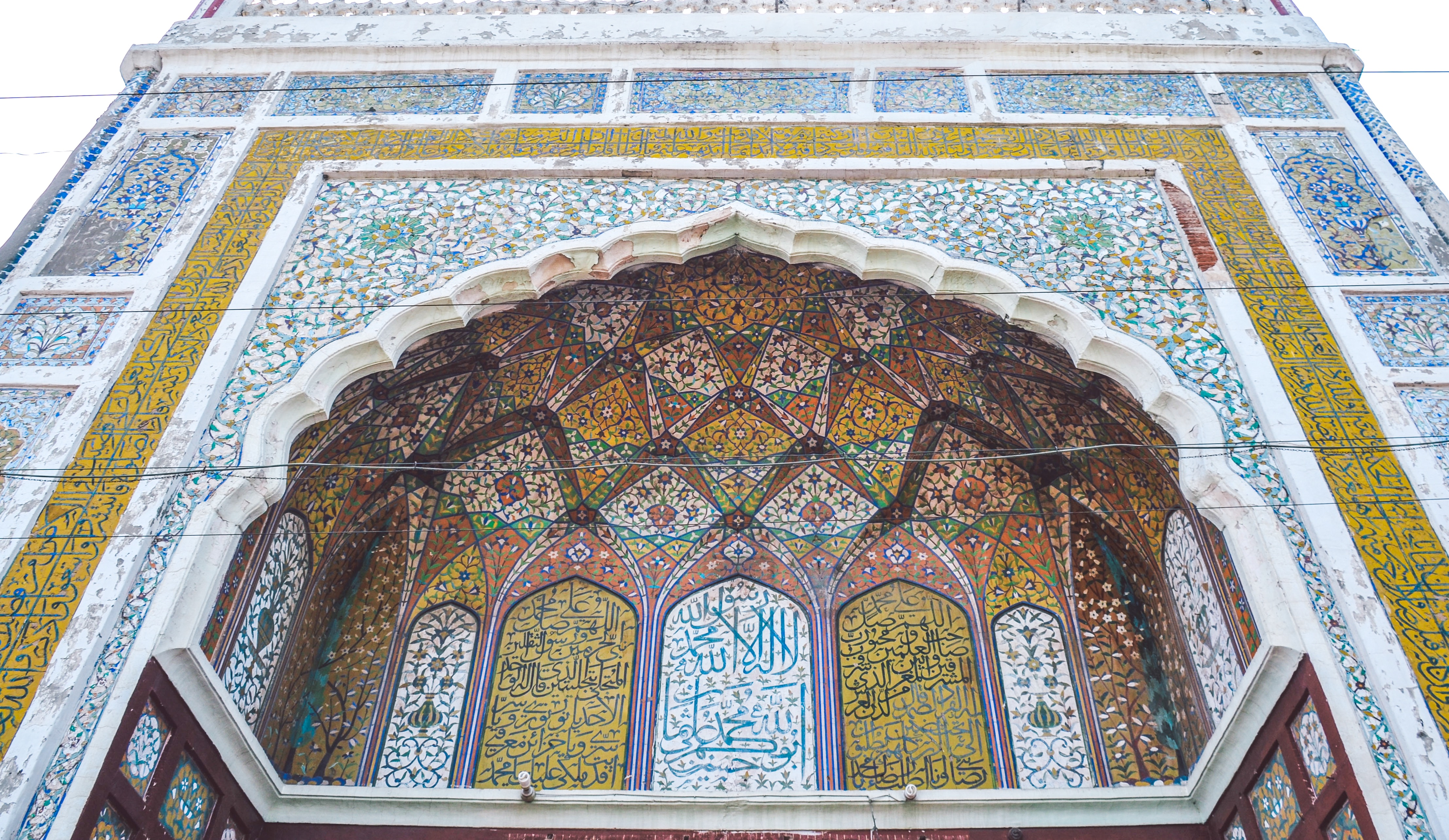
The mosque is lavishly decorated with elaborate tile work

The mosque was designed on a scaled down version of larger Mughal mosques, such as the nearby Badshahi Mosque. The mosque is fronted by an 84-foot-wide courtyard, while the building itself is divided into three sections. The central section is the largest and is topped by a 19-foot dome. This is flanked by two smaller sections with 16-foot domes. The central portion of the mosque is elaborately decorated with predominantly blue, orange, and yellow qashani tile work. The interior also displayed fine frescoes previously, unfortunately these have largely been replaced by modern tiles.

The exterior of the mosque has been embellished with fine tile work, echoing similarities to the tiles of the Wazir Khan Mosque. The exterior features rich decorative works in tile as well.

== Conservation ==
The mosque is listed on the Protected Heritage Monuments of the Archaeology Department of Punjab.
