= Tomb of Dai Anga =

Mughal Monument in Lahore

- مقبرہ دائی انگہ
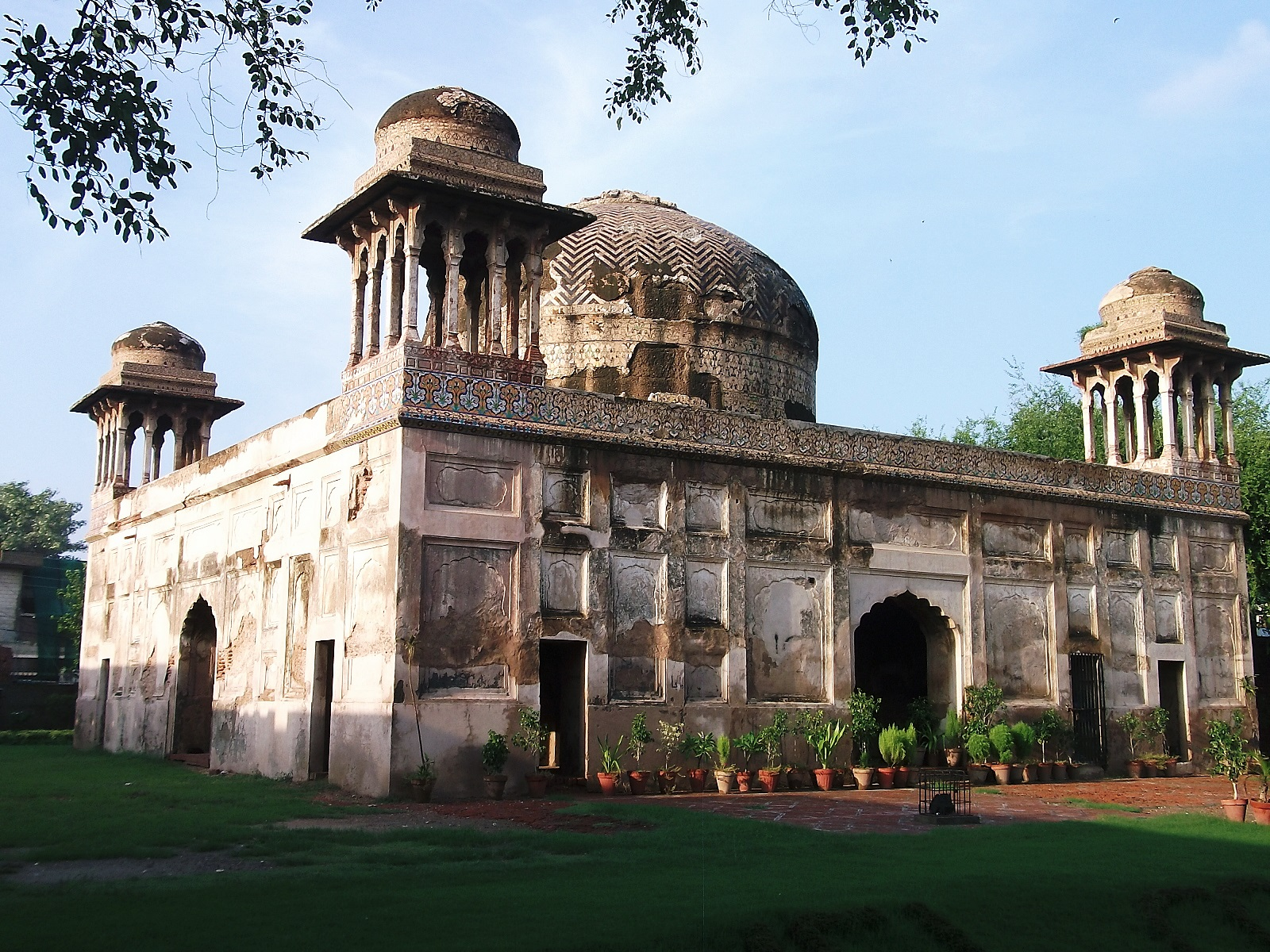
- Interactive map of Tomb of Dai Anga
- Location: Lahore, Punjab Pakistan
- Coordinates: 31°34′43″N 74°21′50″E
- Type: Mausoleum
- Material: brick and marble
- Completion date: Gateway in 1655 C.E.; mausoleum in 1671 C.E.
- Dedicated to: Dai Anga

The Tomb of Dai Anga (Urdu: مقبرہ دائی انگہ), also known as the Gulabi Bagh (Urdu: گلابی باغ), is a 17th-century Mughal tomb complex located in the Mughal-era suburb of Begampura, outside the Walled City of Lahore, Pakistan.

== Background ==
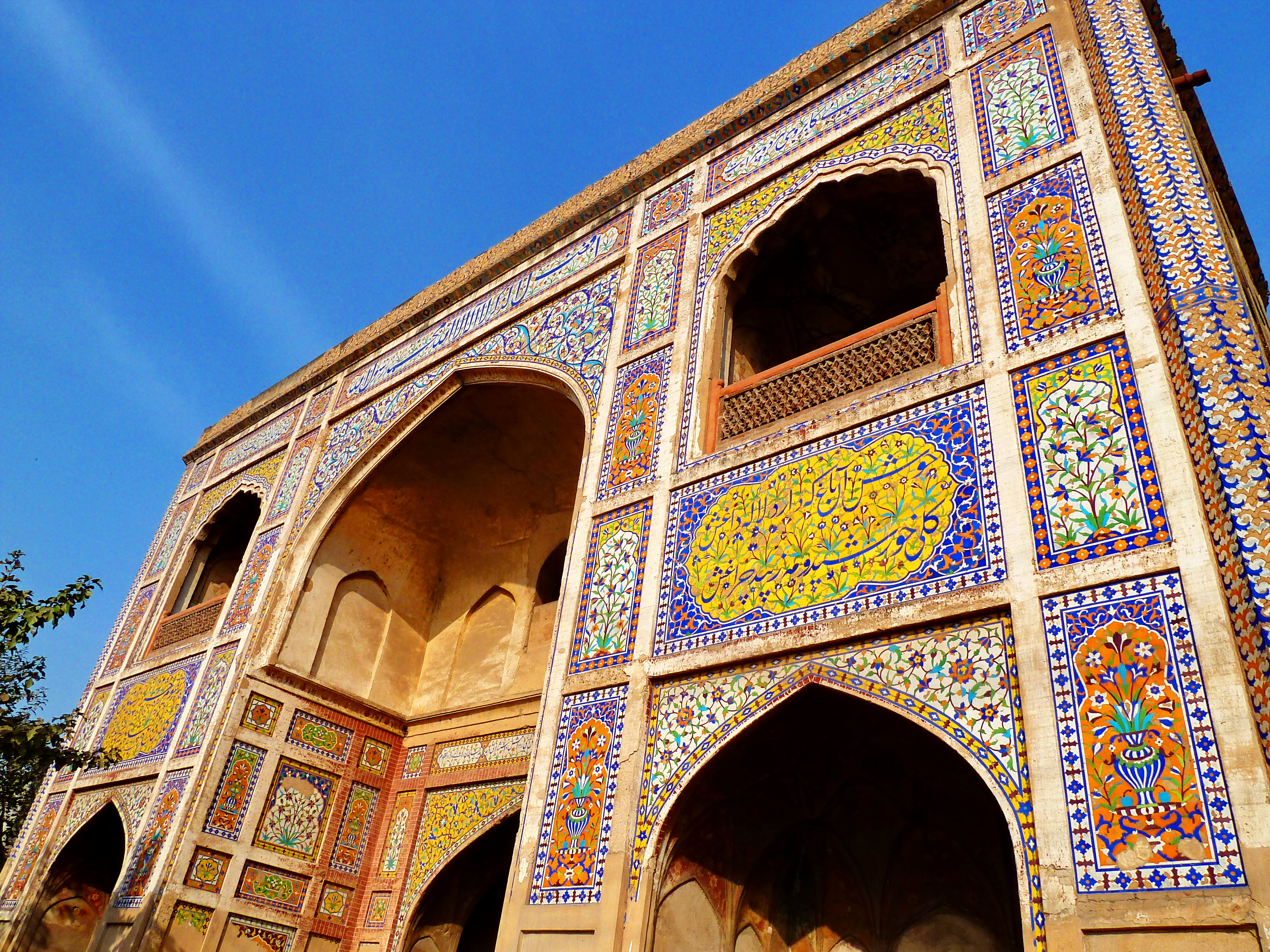
The gateway to the tomb predates the mausoleum by 16 years, is embellished with kashi kari, or Kashan-style tile work.

The mausoleum was built in honour of Dai Anga, the wet nurse of Shah Jahan, and wife of Murad Khan of Bikaner. It is located along the Grand Trunk Road on one of the former routes between Lahore and Delhi. It is also located close to the 17th century tomb of Hazrat Ishaan, and the 18th century Cypress Tomb.

== History ==
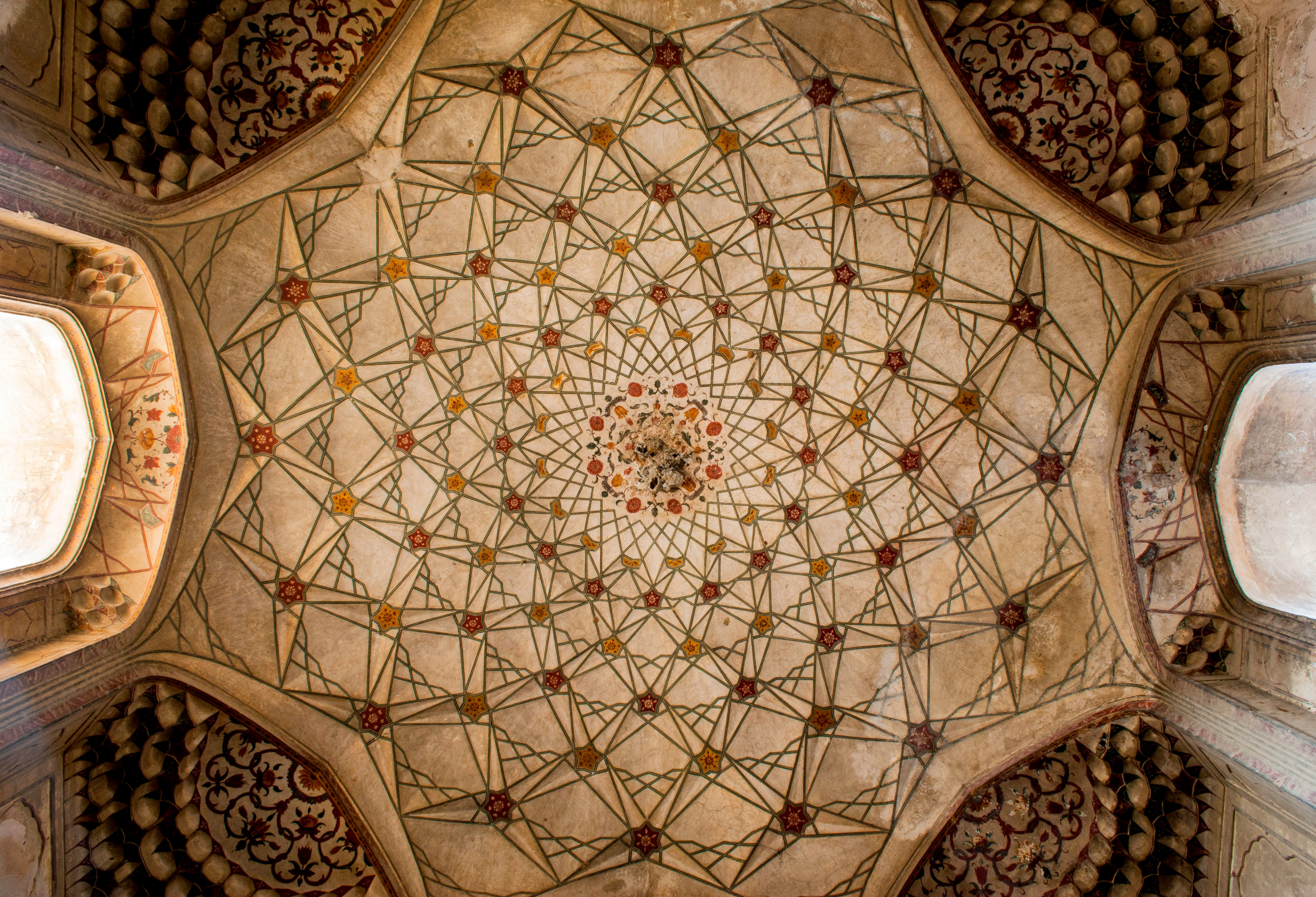
The underside of the tomb's dome still features some Mughal-era frescoes.

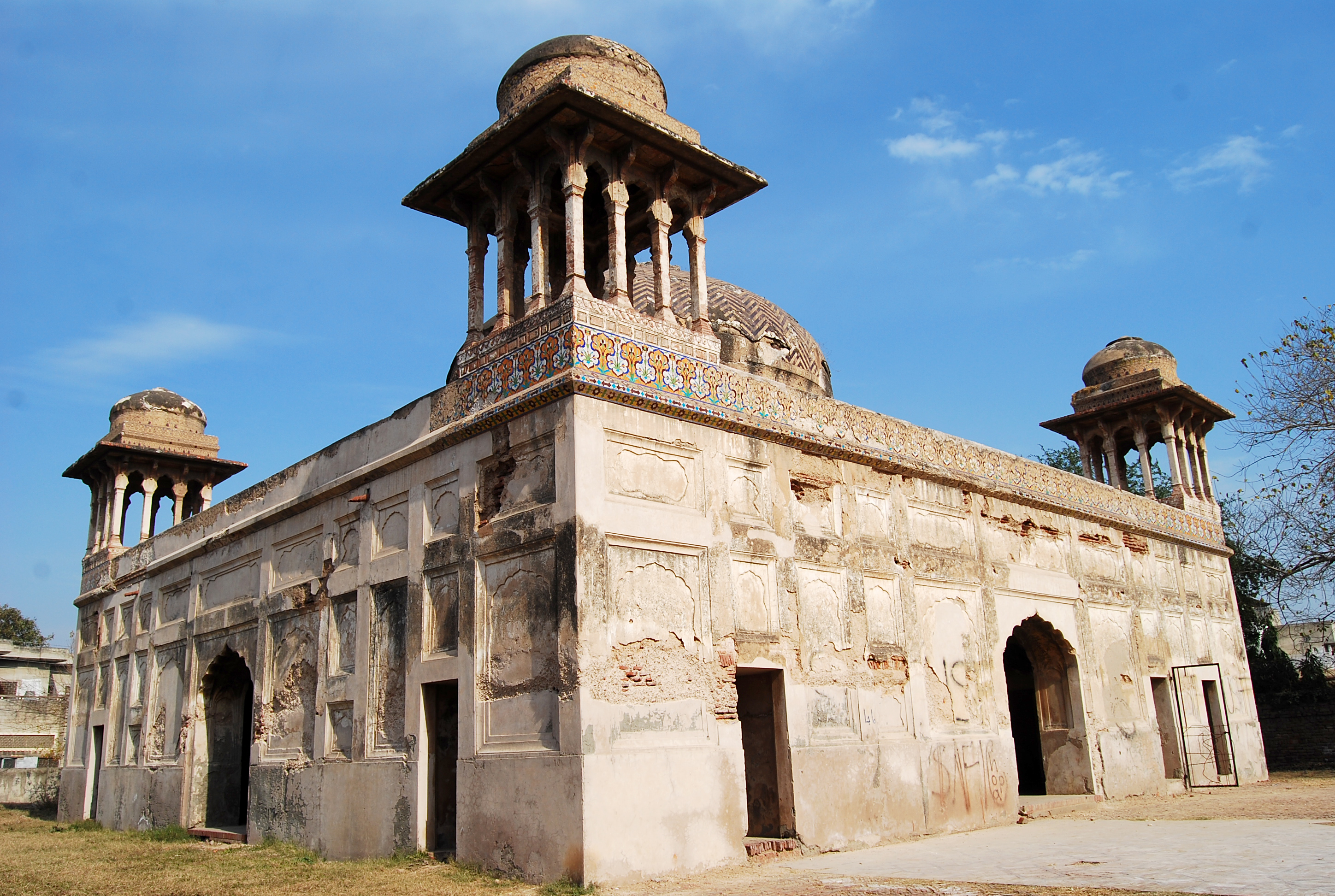
The façade of the structure still has some kashi kari tile work.

The tomb of Dai Anga features a gateway that predates the tomb's construction. Built in 1655 C.E. by the Persian nobleman Mirza Sultan Baig, the gateway was originally the entrance to a pleasure garden. The original garden was square in shape, and had measured 250 Guz on each side.

In 1671 C.E., the pleasure garden was repurposed into a tomb for the wet-nurse of the Mughal Emperor Shah Jahan, and wife to Murad Khan, magistrate of Bikaner under the Emperor Jehangir. A new mausoleum was constructed in the centre of the garden, which over the centuries has been encroached upon by neighbouring structures, with only a narrow strip of garden between the tomb and gateway remaining.

== Architecture ==
The mausoleum is rectangular in shape with eight rooms encircling the perimeter of a central chamber. The entire mausoleum is on a raised plinth. A dome with frescoes is directly above the central chamber. The chamber itself is empty, as the actual tomb of Dai Anga lies below in a subterranean crypt. She is buried next to her daughter Sultana Begum. Both cenotaphs have been removed, and the subterranean chamber is no longer accessible to the public.

The central change is richly decorated with carved inscriptions from the Quran, as well as elegant frescoes made by the renowned calligrapher Muhammad Saleh. The exterior of the tomb was also once covered in rich kashi kari, or Qashani tile-work, though much of the tiles have been lost through the centuries.

== Conservation ==
The tomb complex is listed on the Protected Heritage Monuments of the Archaeology Department of Punjab.

== Impact of Metro construction ==
The tomb is situated along the planned route of the Orange Line of the Lahore metro. Heritage campaigners submitted a petition to the Lahore High Court as the planned metro line will pass close to the tomb, Shalimar Gardens, and nine other sites in the city in violation of the Punjab Special Premises Ordinance, 1985 and Antiquity Act, 1975. In August 2016, the Court halted construction of the metro within 200 feet of any heritage site, including the tomb in order to prevent what UNESCO termed as potentially "irreversible damage," were the line to be constructed in its present form.

== Gallery ==
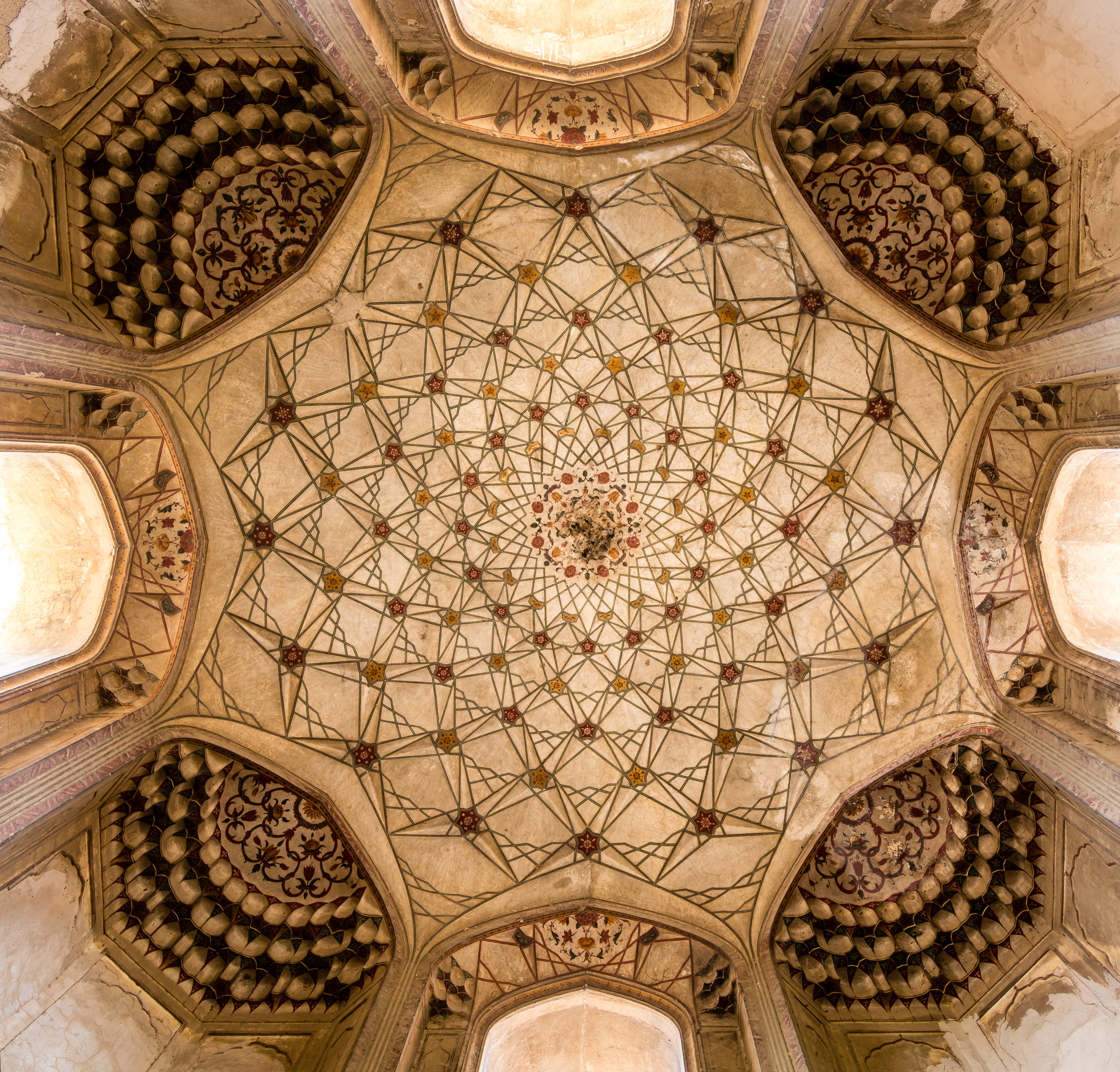
The ceiling of the tomb is embellished with Mughal frescoes.

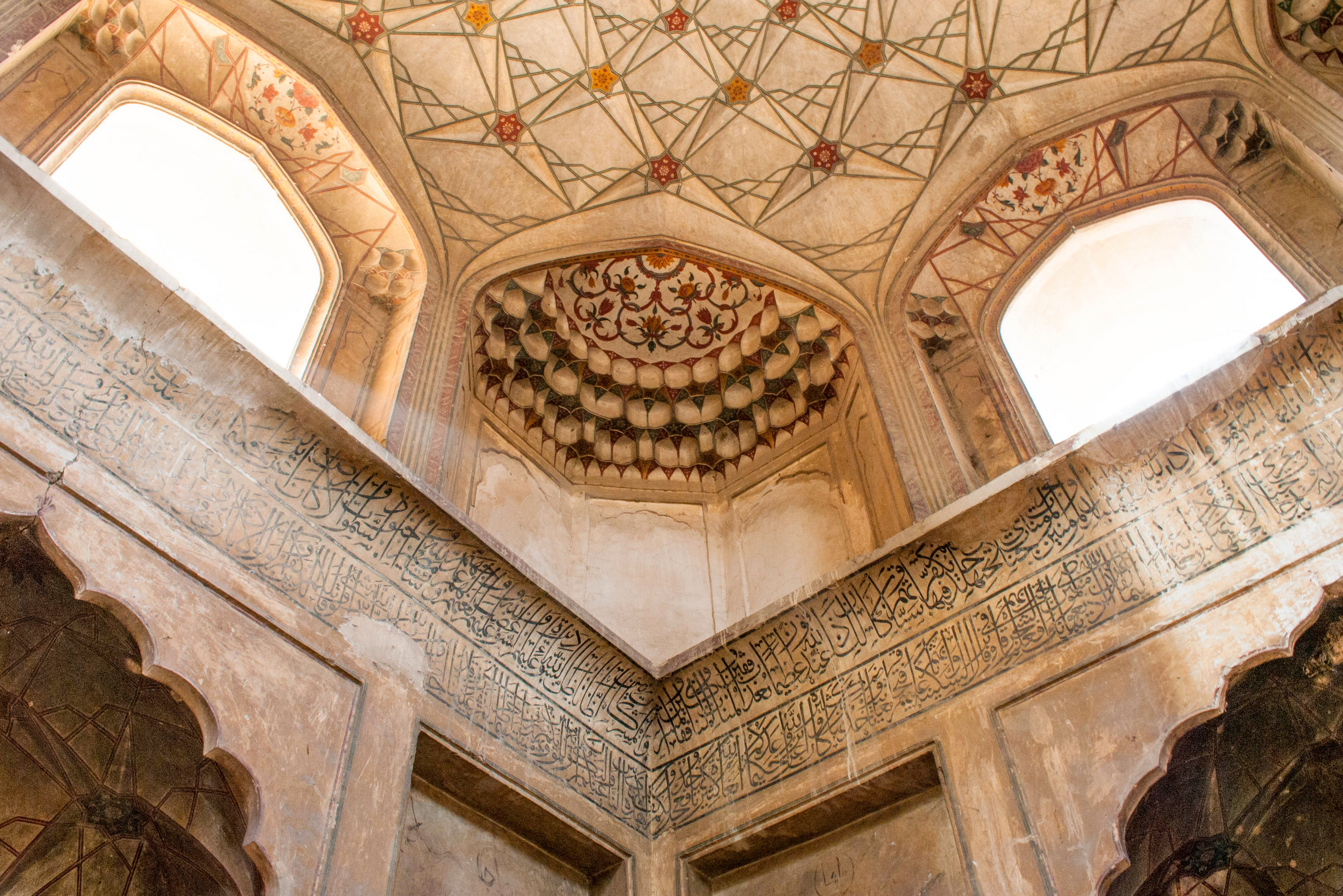
The interior of the tomb was richly decorated with stone-carvings, tile work, and frescoes.

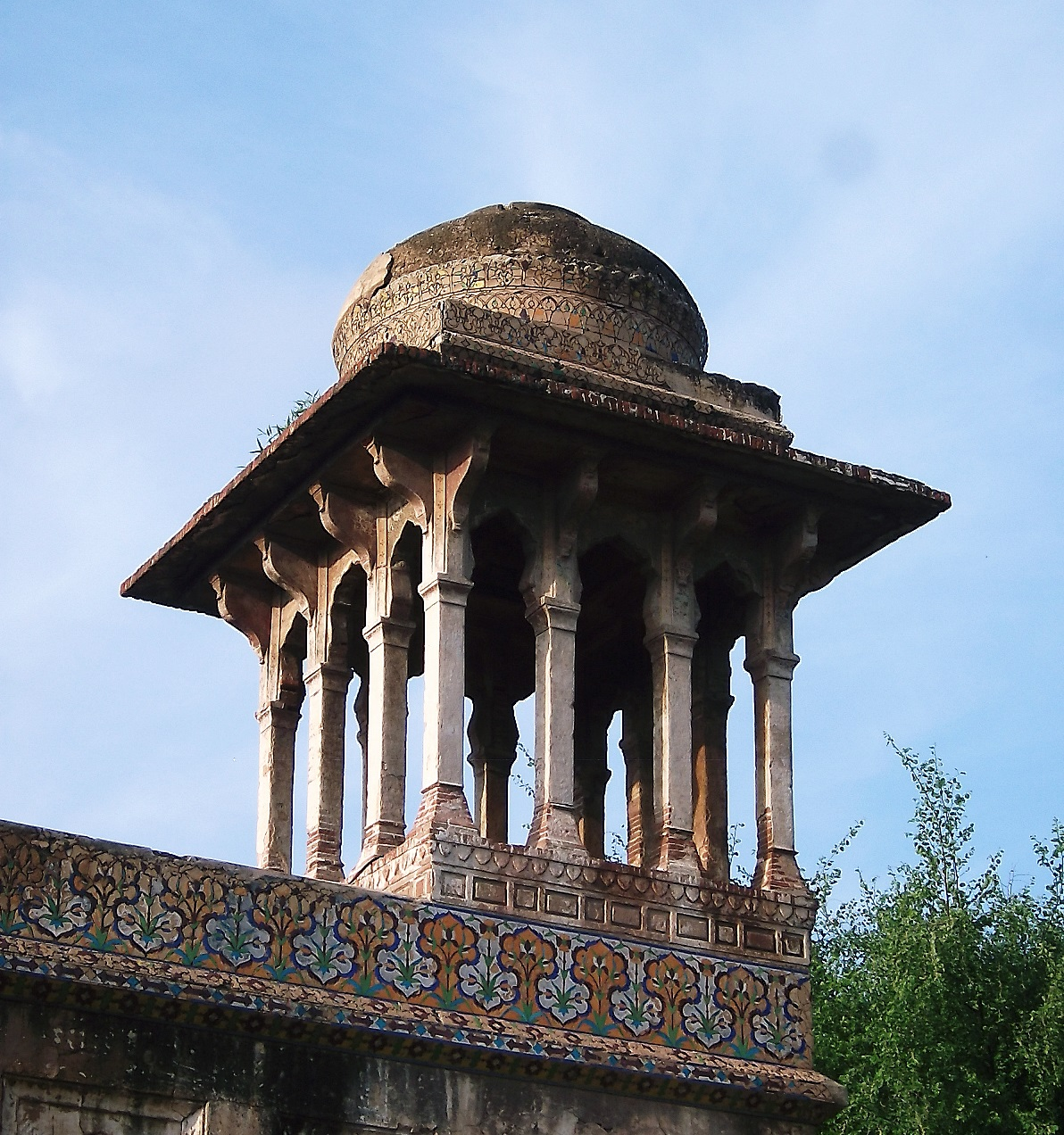
The corners of the mausoleum are topped by towers.

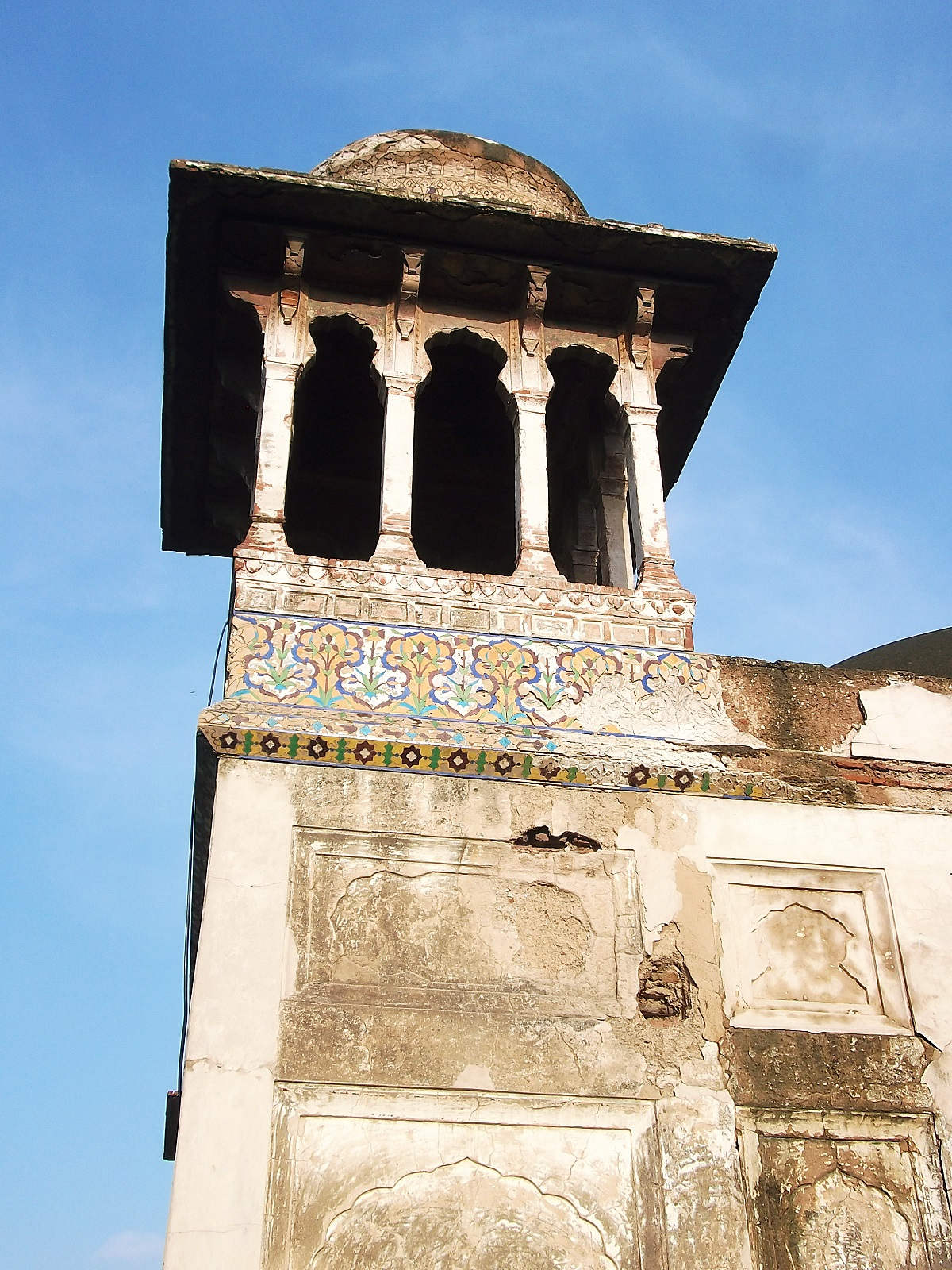
the bases of the towers feature mosaic work.

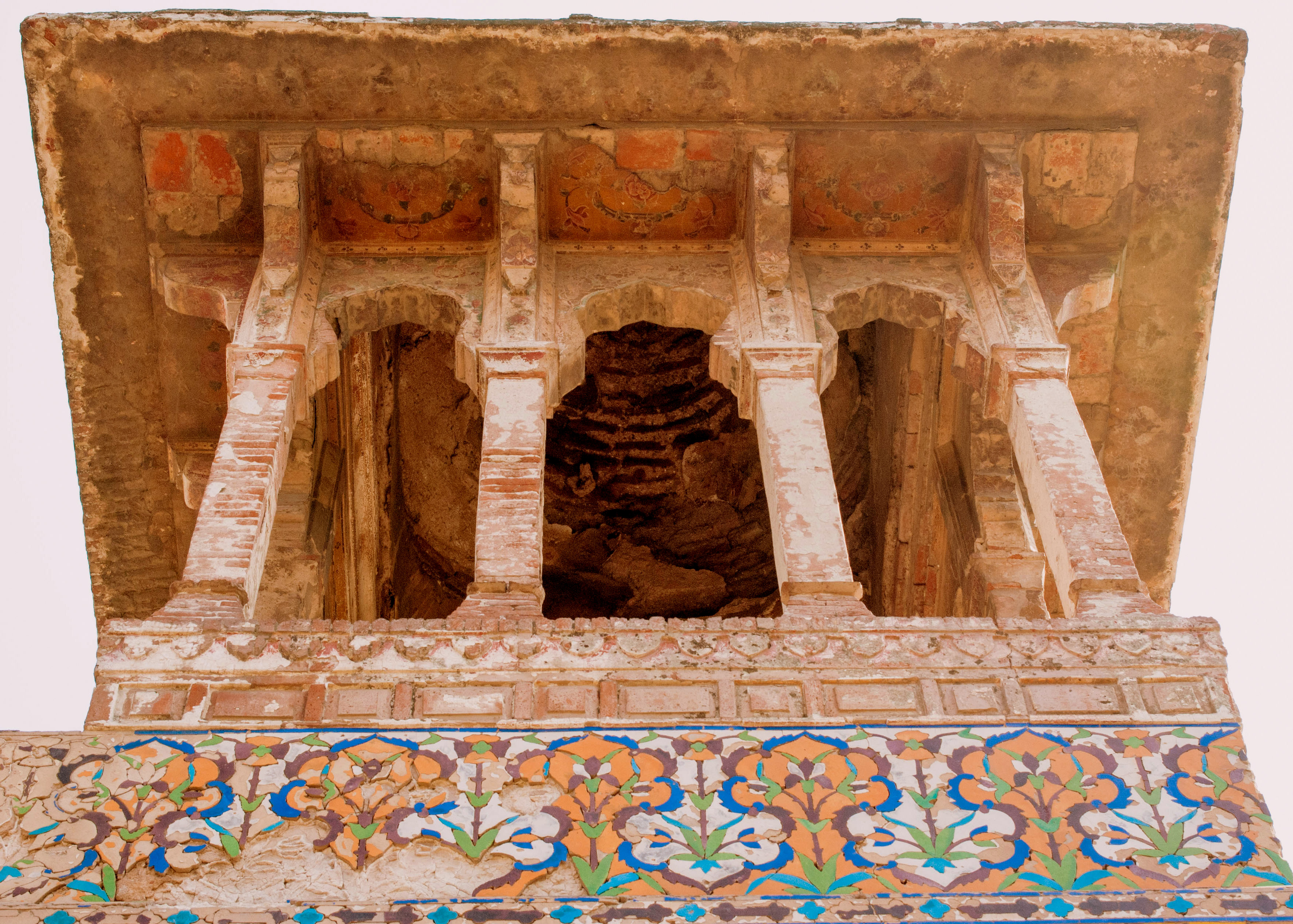
The towers at the corners of the tomb still has some kashi kari tile work.

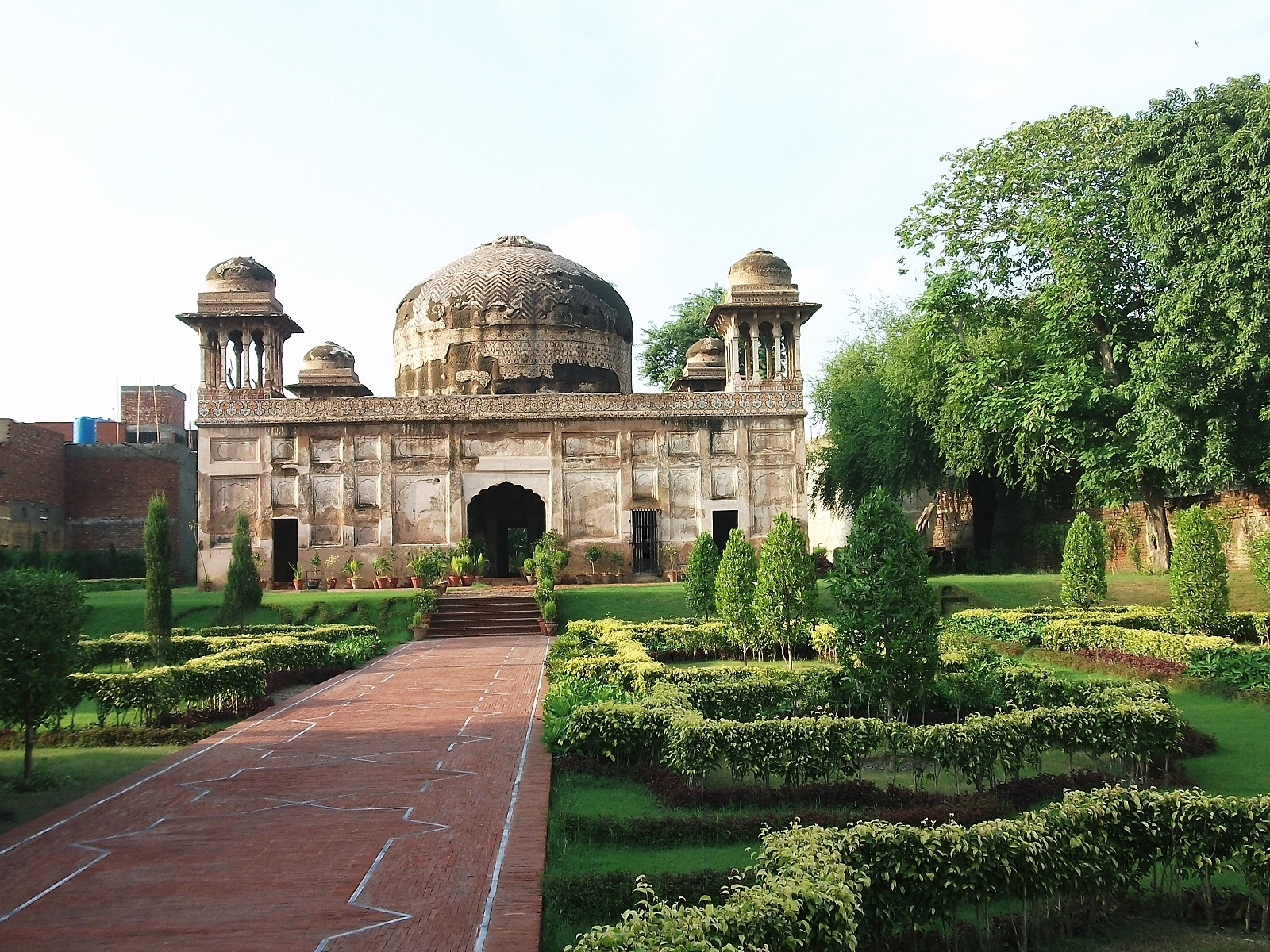
A view of the tomb with the garden in foreground

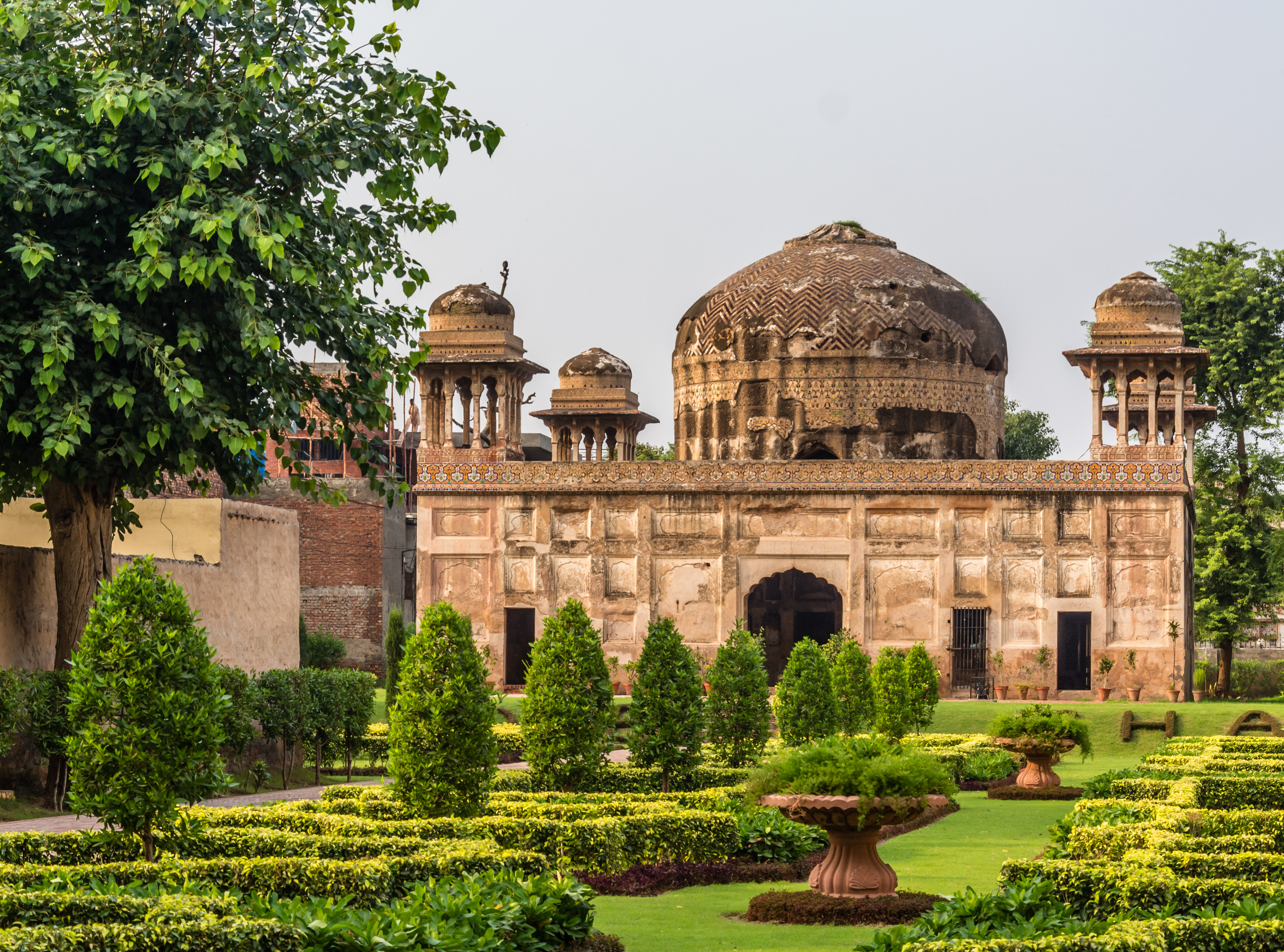
A view of the tomb with the garden in foreground

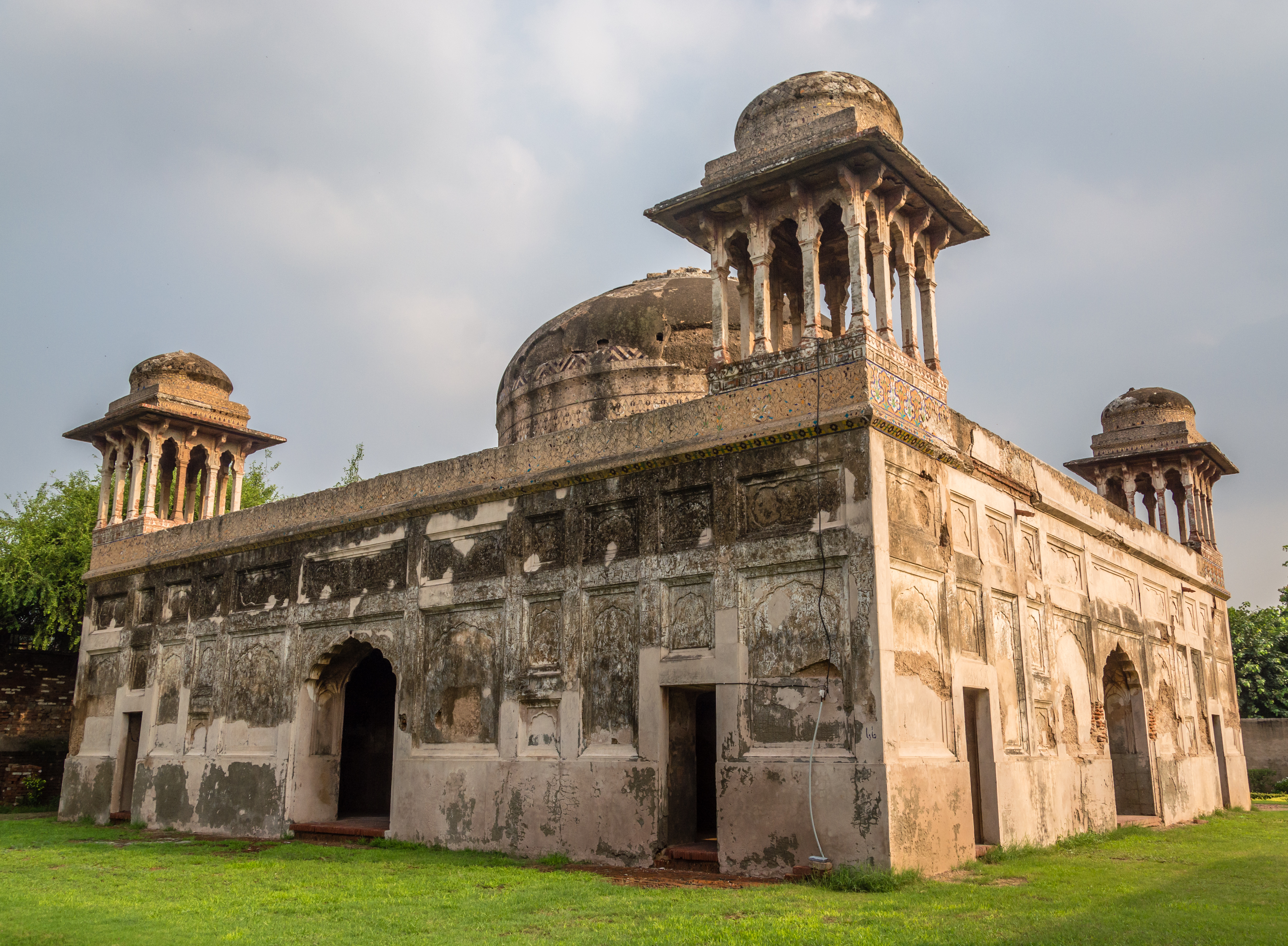
A view of the rear façade

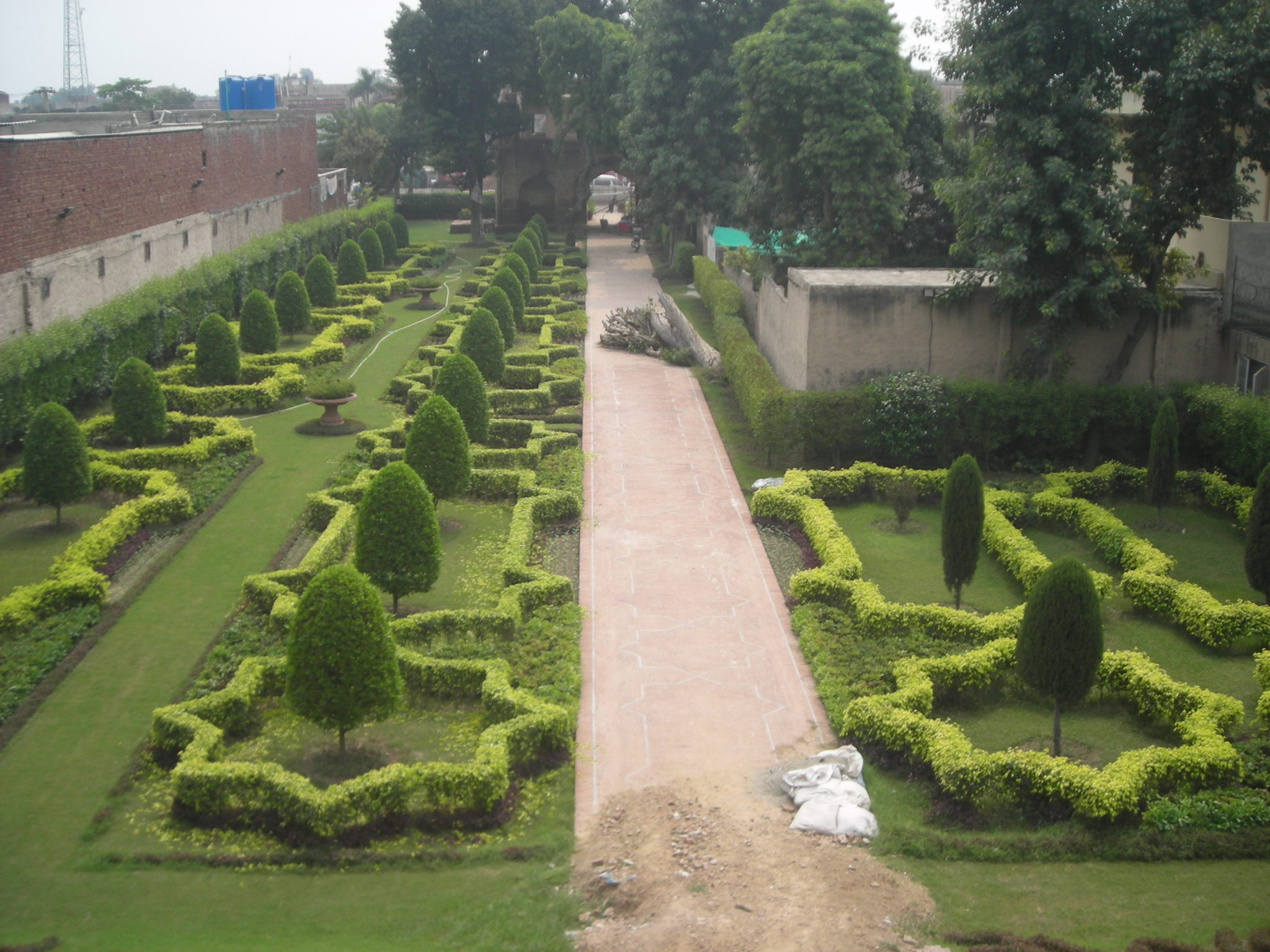
The site features formal gardens.
