= Dai Anga =

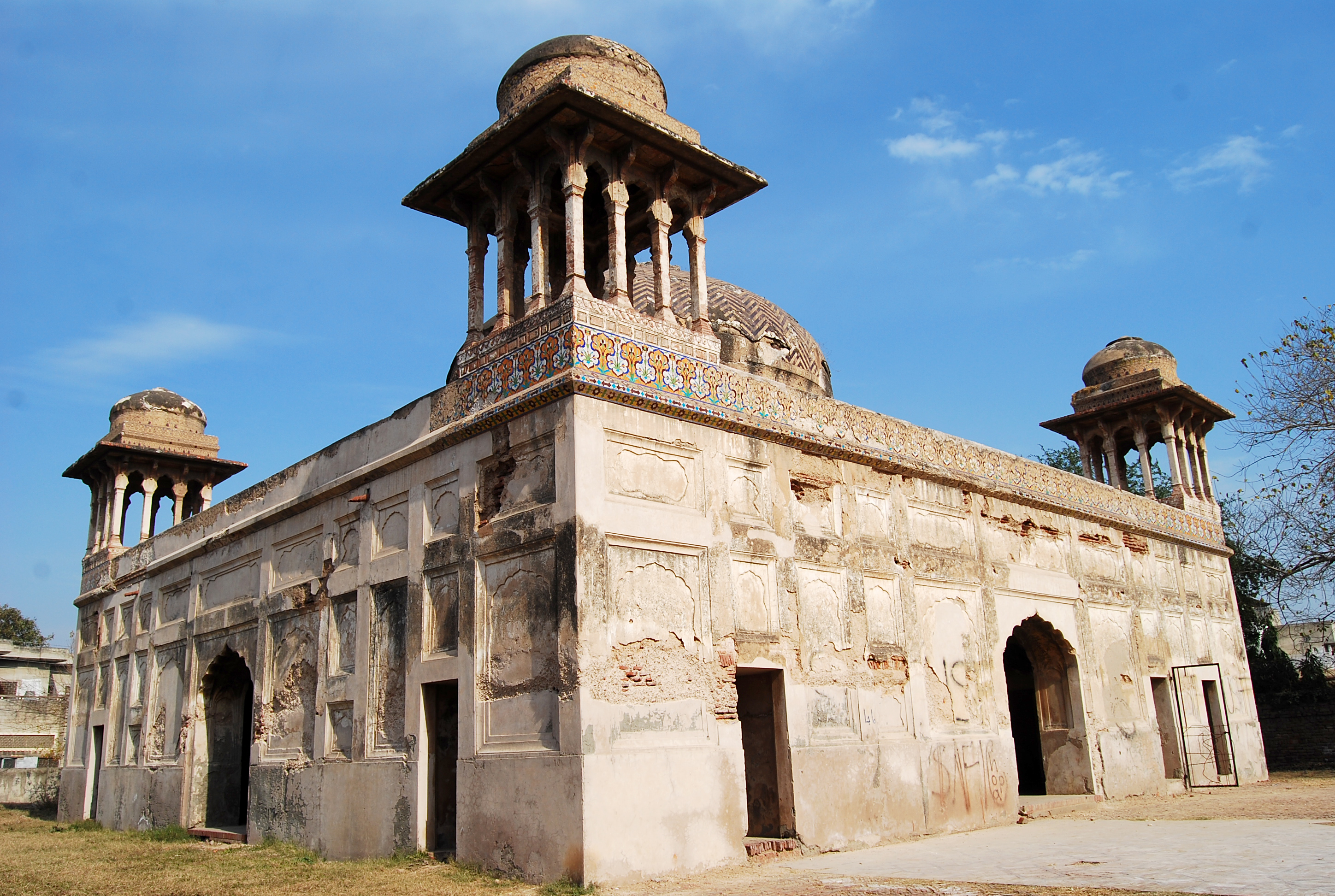
Tomb of Dai Anga in Lahore.

Born as Zeb-un-Nisa, Dai Anga (Urdu: دائی انگہ), was the wet-nurse of the Mughal Emperor, Shah Jahan. Her family was closely associated with the Mughal empire. Her husband Murad Khan served in the court of Emperor Jahangir as Magistrate of Bikaner, and her son Muhammad Rashid Khan, was the best archers in the kingdom, and died fighting in the service of Shah Jahan's eldest son Dara Shikoh.

She commissioned the Dai Anga Mosque in Lahore, Pakistan, before departing for the Hajj pilgrimage. The Tomb of Dai Anga is known as the "Gulabi Bagh," and is also located in Lahore.
