= Cypress Tomb =

Cypress Tomb سرو والا مقبرہ
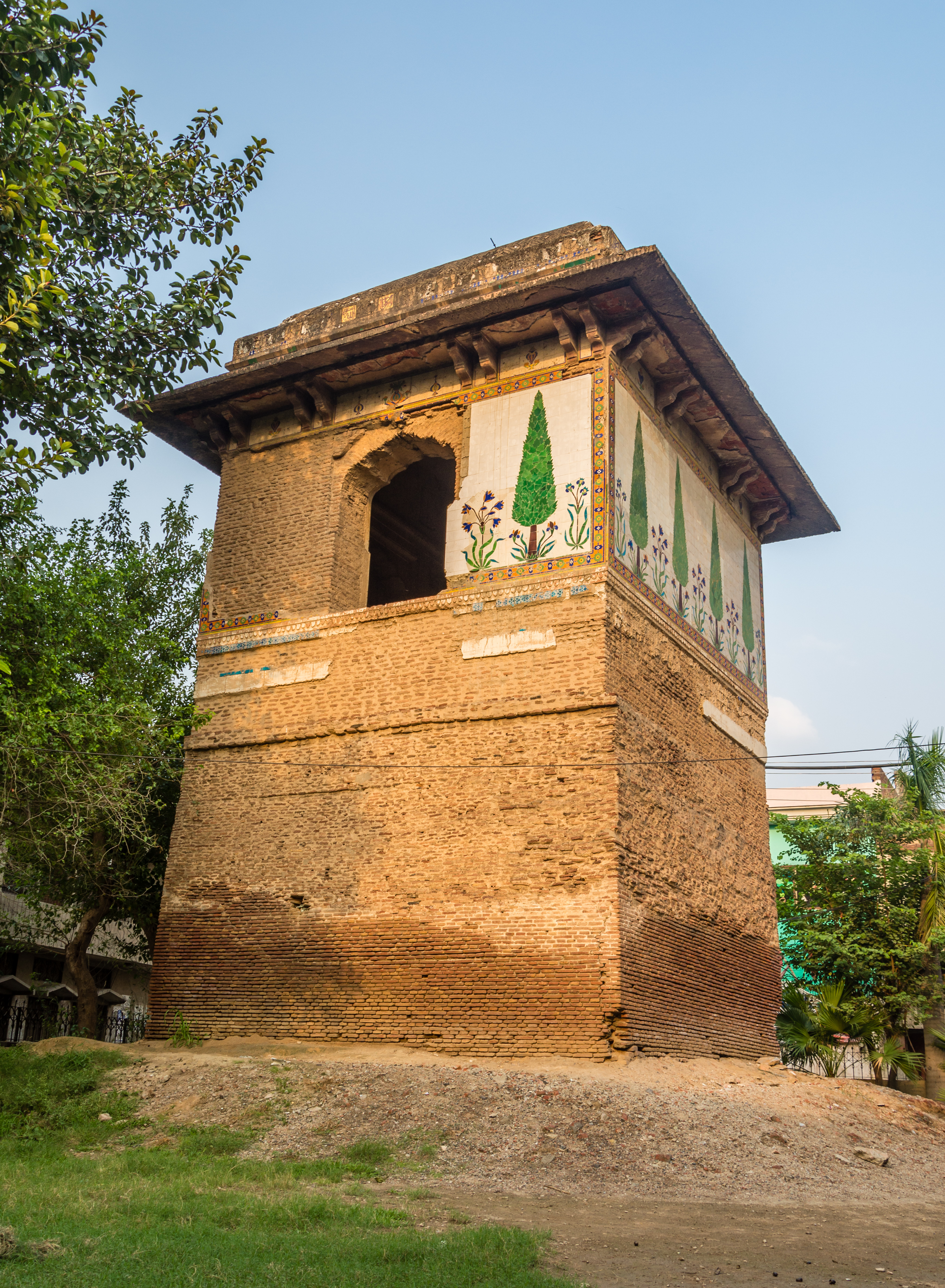
- Interactive map of the Cypress Tomb سرو والا مقبرہ area

General information
- Architectural style: Indo-Islamic architecture, Mughal architecture
- Location: Lahore, Punjab Pakistan
- Coordinates: 31.5809°N 74.3641°E
- Completed: c. 1735— 1740

Height
- Height: 12 meters (39 ft)

Cypress Tomb, also known as Saruwala Maqbara (Urdu: سرو والا مقبرہ), is an early 18th century tomb located in Begumpura, Lahore, Pakistan.

== Background ==
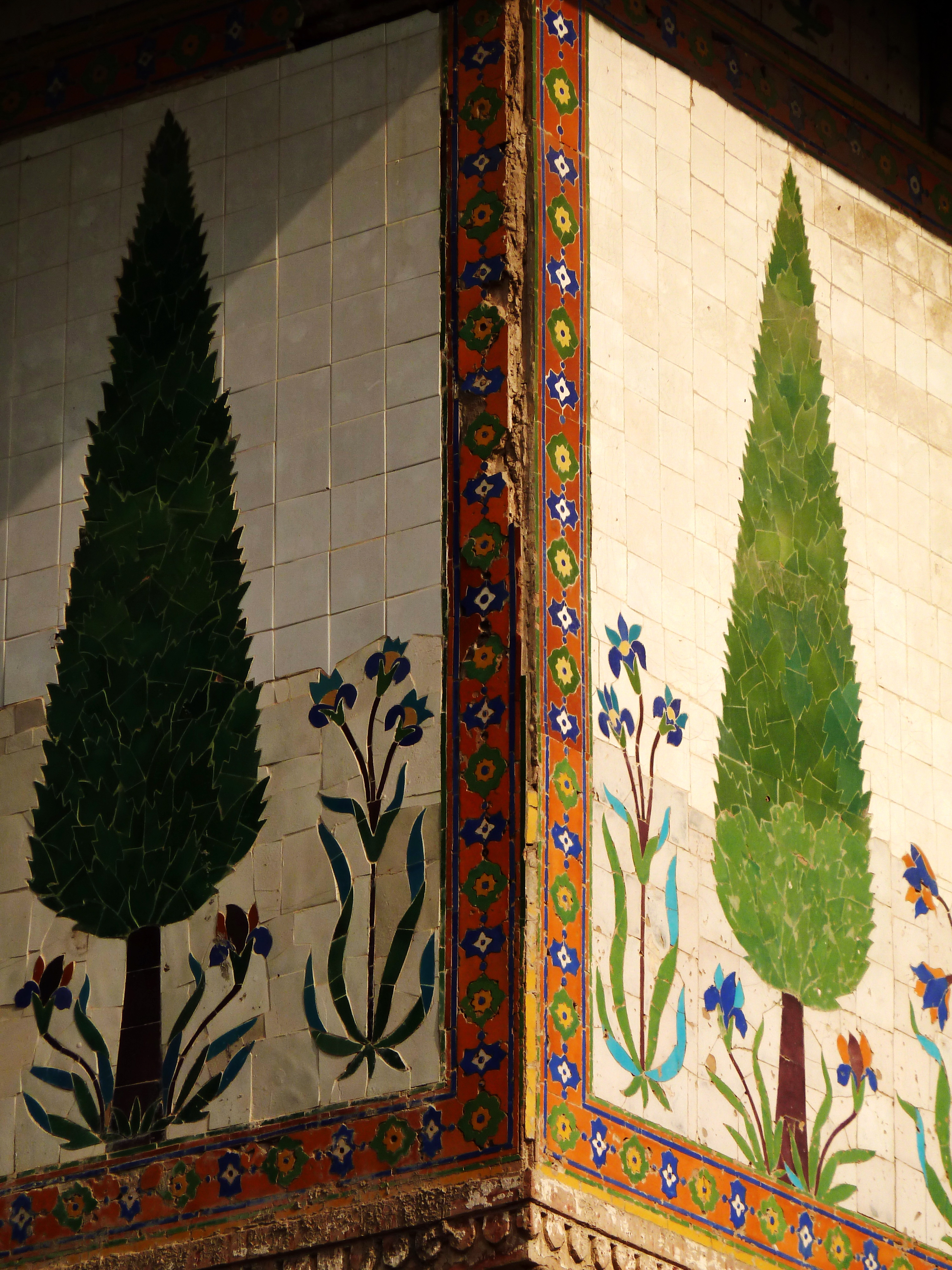
The cypress motif

This structure houses the tomb of Sharf-un-Nisa Begam, sister of Nawab Zakariya Khan, the governor of Lahore province during the reign of Mughal emperor Muhammad Shah Rangeela, built in the eighteenth century. It is located near to the north of the Tomb of Dai Anga, and east of the Grand Trunk Road in the Begampura neighbourhood of Lahore, Pakistan.

== History ==
The structure was built during 1735–1740 CE, and was used by Sharf-un-Nisa Begam as a meditation chamber during her lifetime. Sharf-un-Nisa Begam had the structure constructed as a place for her to read the Quran in the mornings. She climbed up and descended from the structure by means of a wooden ladder. After her death, the meditation chamber was converted into her tomb, so that even in death, she could remain in purdah and out of view of unrelated men.

The building came to be known locally as the Cypress tomb, on account of the tile motifs depicting cypress trees, alongside other floral motifs used on the tiles on the exterior walls.

The tomb was originally surrounded by a garden and pool, which likely abutted the garden which once surrounded the nearby Tomb of Dai Anga. The tomb was one of the last notable structures of the late Mughal era.

During Sikh rule in the 18th century, it was believed that the tomb contained treasure, and so Sharf-un-Nisa Begam's Quran and sword were both plundered and the tomb desecrated.

As new buildings have been constructed around the area, it has become difficult to access the tomb. It was initially surrounded by gardens, but because of the houses built on them, a "small garden" exists today in which the local boys play cricket.

== Architecture ==
Historian Catherine Blanshard Asher describes the tomb as "Lahore's best preserved monument from the post-Aurangzeb period". It is a "unique structure" as it is like a tapering tower with a "pyramidal vault".

The exterior walls of the tomb are covered with Varanasi tiles, whose colours are much fainter than other buildings where similar tiles have been used. The lower part of the walls contains white and blue tiles imported from western Europe. The mosaic tiles are set in a plaster base. The structure has an elevated platform, so that Sharf-un-Nisa Begam could remain in purdah even after death.

The use of glazed tiles is not unique in Lahore architecture, but the "stiff, rigid quality" of the design of these separates it from other buildings in the city.

== Conservation ==
The tomb is listed on the Protected Heritage Monuments of the Archaeology Department of Punjab.

== Gallery ==
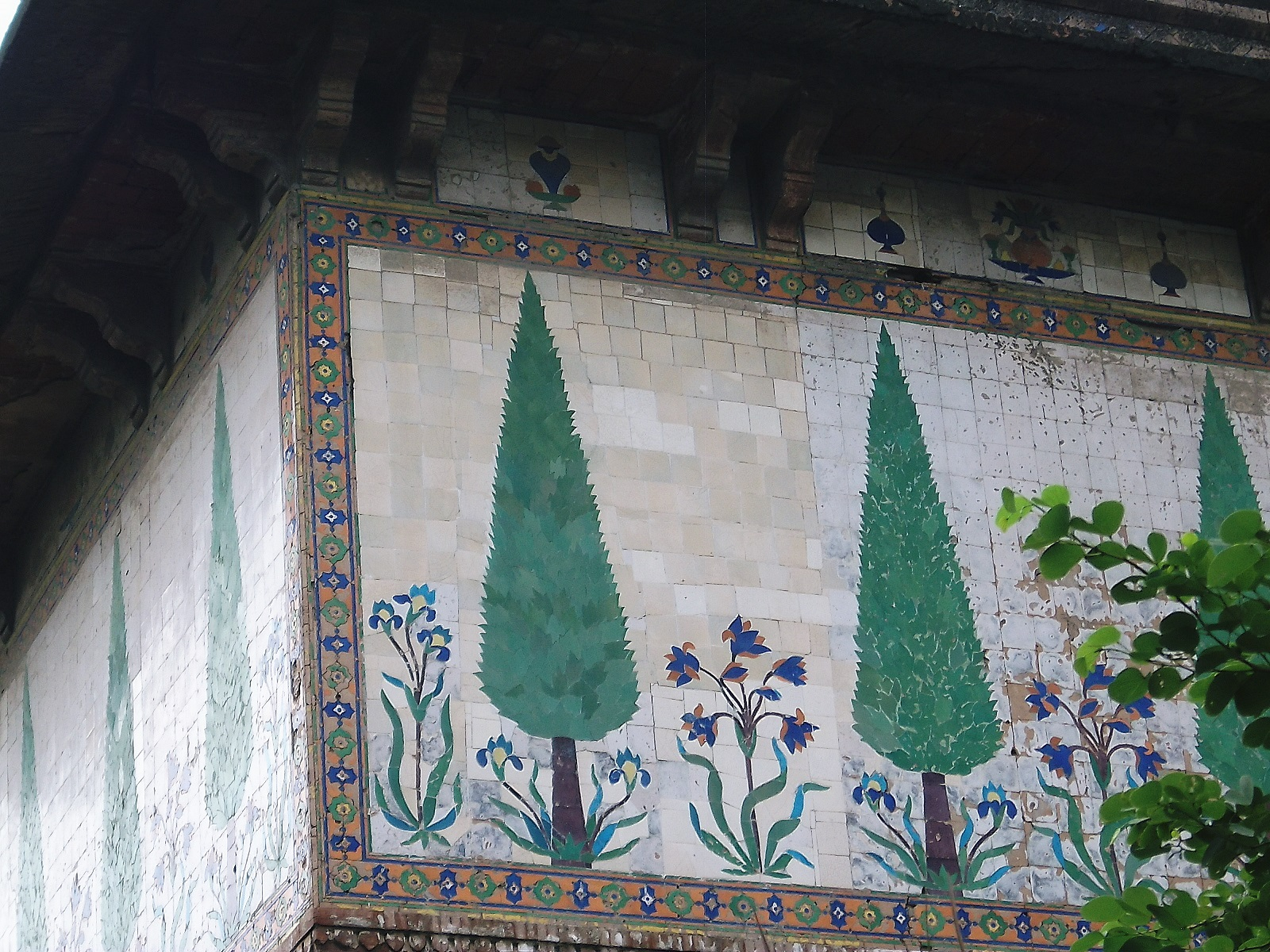
A well-preserved portion of the tomb's exterior

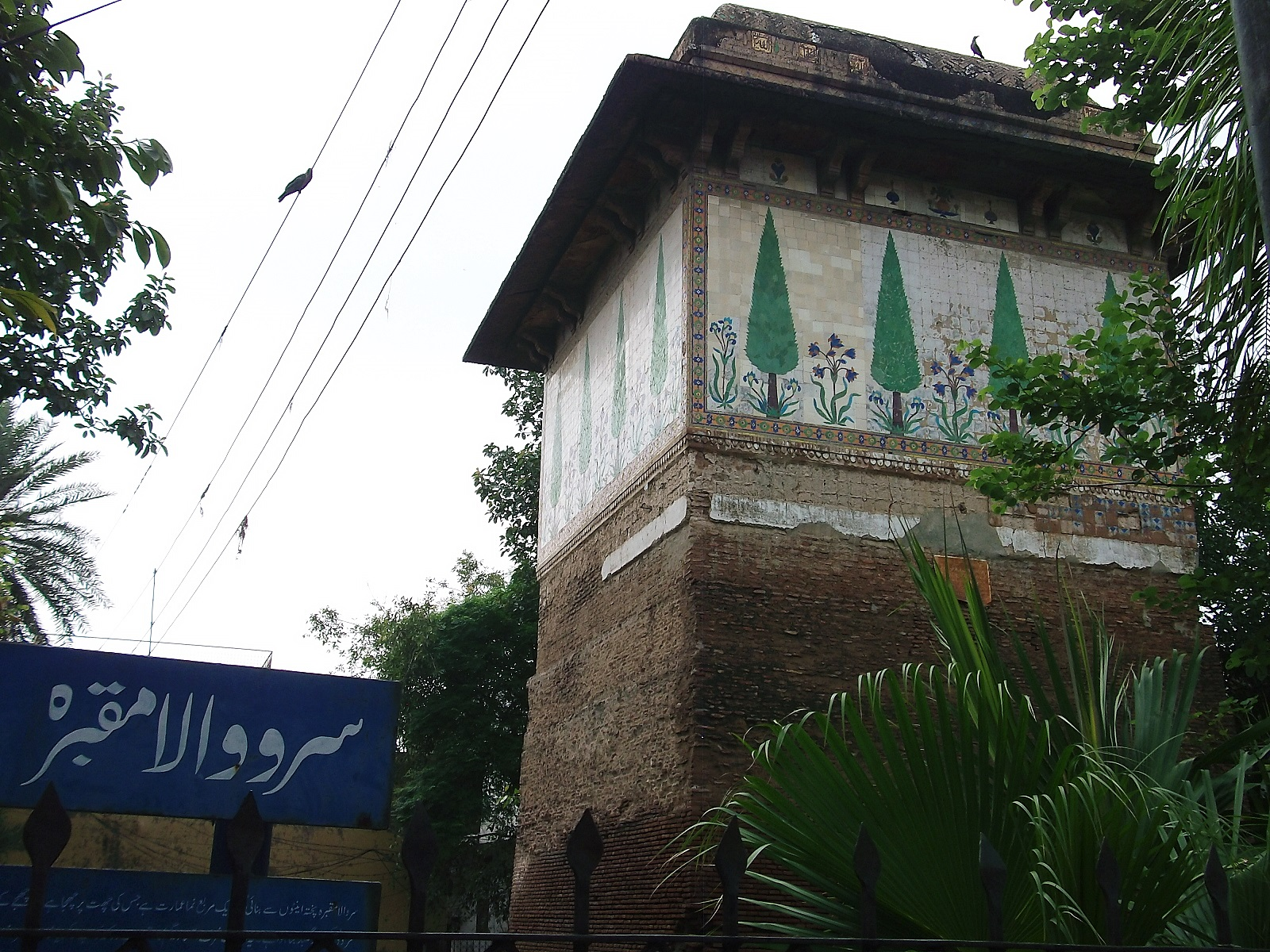
Tomb with plaque

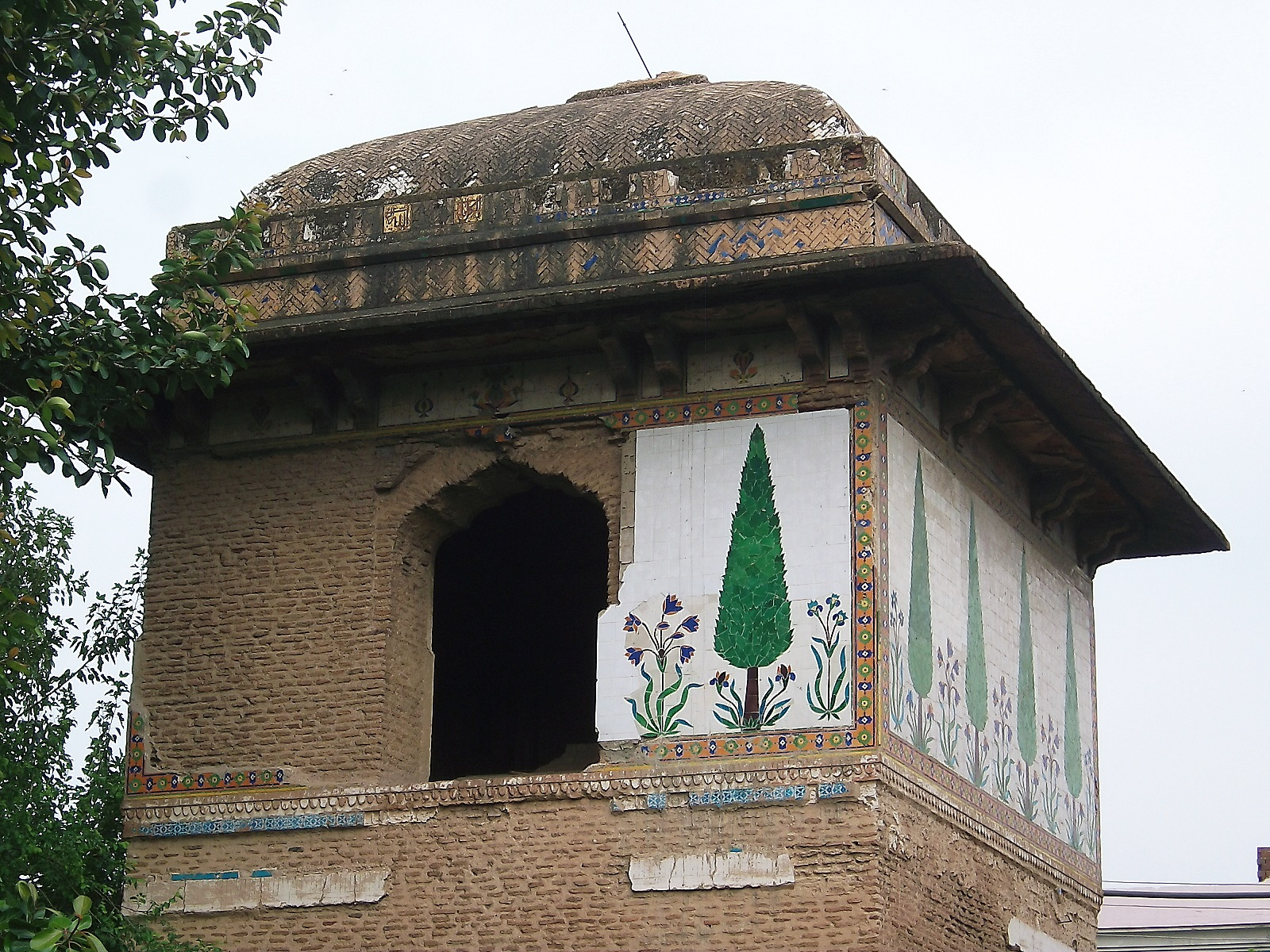
Elevated entrance to the chamber
