= Begampura =

Residential neighbourhood in the City District of Lahore, Punjab, Pakistan

- Town
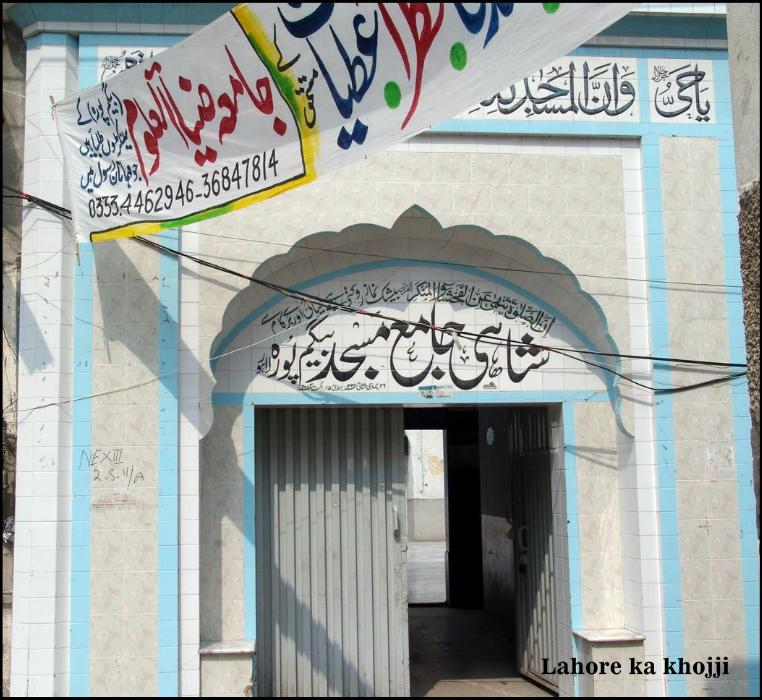
- Begampura Royal Mosque

- Location within Pakistan
- Coordinates: 31°35′N 74°22′E
- Country: Pakistan
- Province: Punjab
- City: Lahore
- Tehsil: Shalimar

Begampura is a neighbourhood in Shalimar Tehsil of Lahore in Punjab, Pakistan. It is located near Grand Trunk Road, Lahore. The University of Engineering and Technology, Lahore is located in Begampura.

There are a number of mosques and graveyards adjoining Begampura Road, including the early 18th-century Cypress Tomb (also known as Saruwala Maqbara) and Begampura Royal Mosque.
