= Qashani =

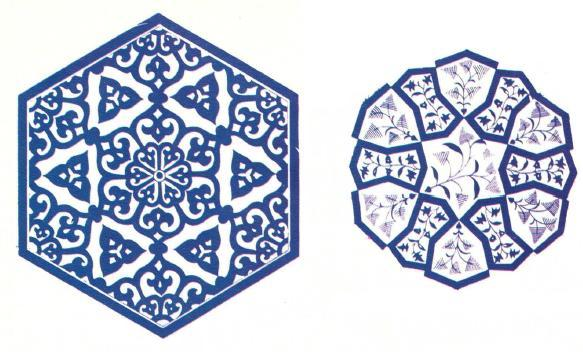
Model of typical Qashani tile work consists of floral and geometrical patterns.

Qashani or Kashani is a Persian decorative art which had been popular in Iran in the 16th to 18th century, and then moved to Turkey in the time of the Ottomans with the transfer of many Persian artists to Turkey, becoming the basis for decorating the walls of mosques, palaces, shrines and tombs. It is a square-shaped ceramic tile which uses Persian-like floral-depicting 4- or 6-sided glazed tiles, decorated with blue, cyan, green and sometimes red colors. The decoration is surrounded by fine black lines that make it stand out on its white floor. The tile work had often been decorated by the inscription, floral and geometrical patterns. The inscription often provides Qur'anic verses or sentences related to historical events written in Persian script. The plant often consists of natural flowers such as lily, cloves, roses and cypress trees. Geometrical patterns consist of different geometrical shapes and polygons. In Morocco, similar artistic technique is known as zillij. Its use has been widespread in the decoration of the walls of the buildings in the Ottoman era, and this mosaical feature can also be seen in the Dome of the Rock in Jerusalem. Kashi, the abbreviated form of Qashani, was also introduced to Sindh, Kutch, and Multan where numerous examples of shrines and mosques embellished with blue, white and green tile work exist.

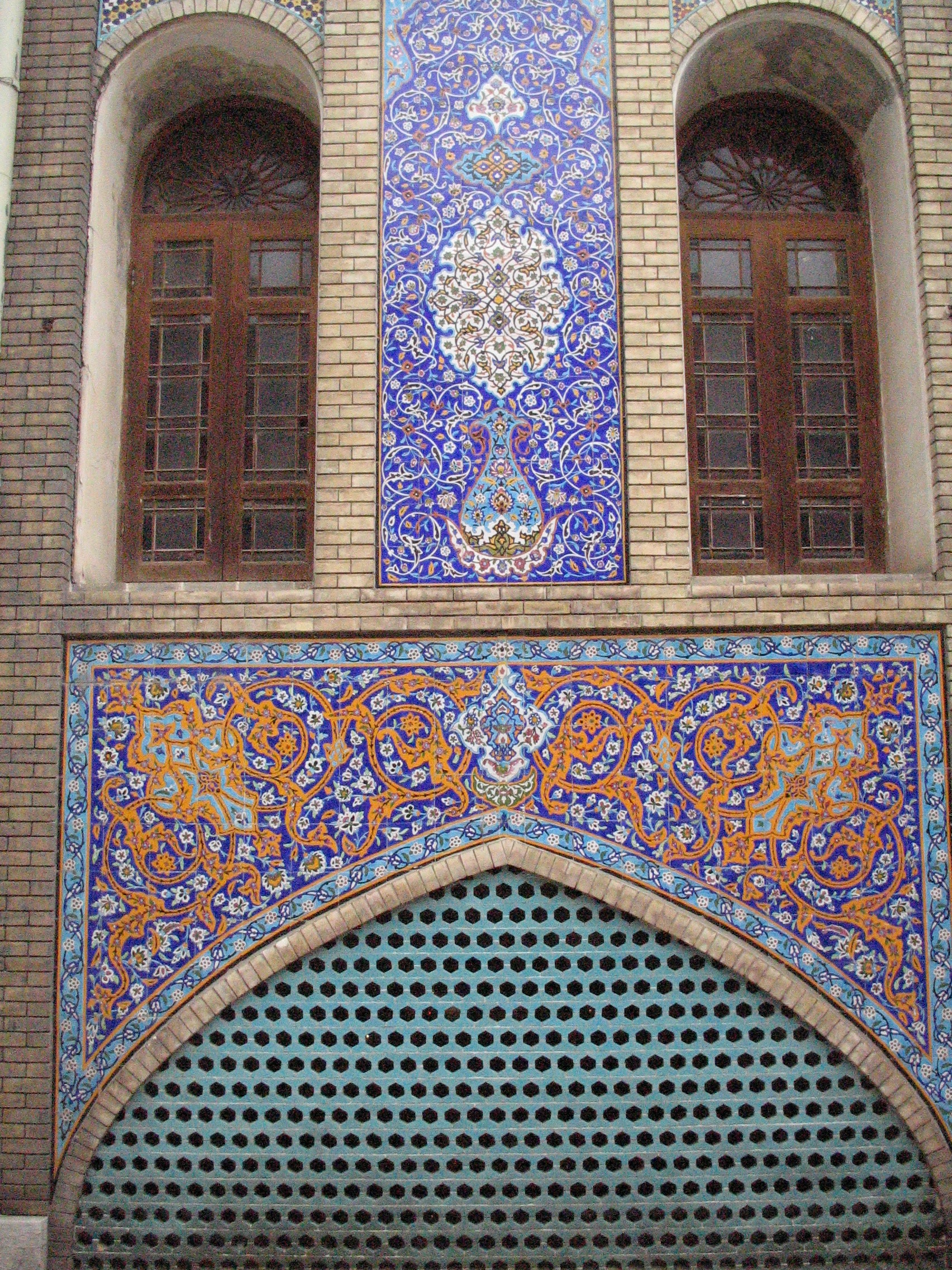
A ceramic-tiled wall of Emarat-e Badgir building, Golestan Palace compound, Tehran, Iran

== See also ==
- Chinese influences on Islamic pottery
- Islamic pottery
- İznik pottery
