= Gorkhmaz Sujaddinov =

Azerbaijani-Soviet sculptor

Honored Artist of Azerbaijan SSR Gorkhmaz Sujaddinov
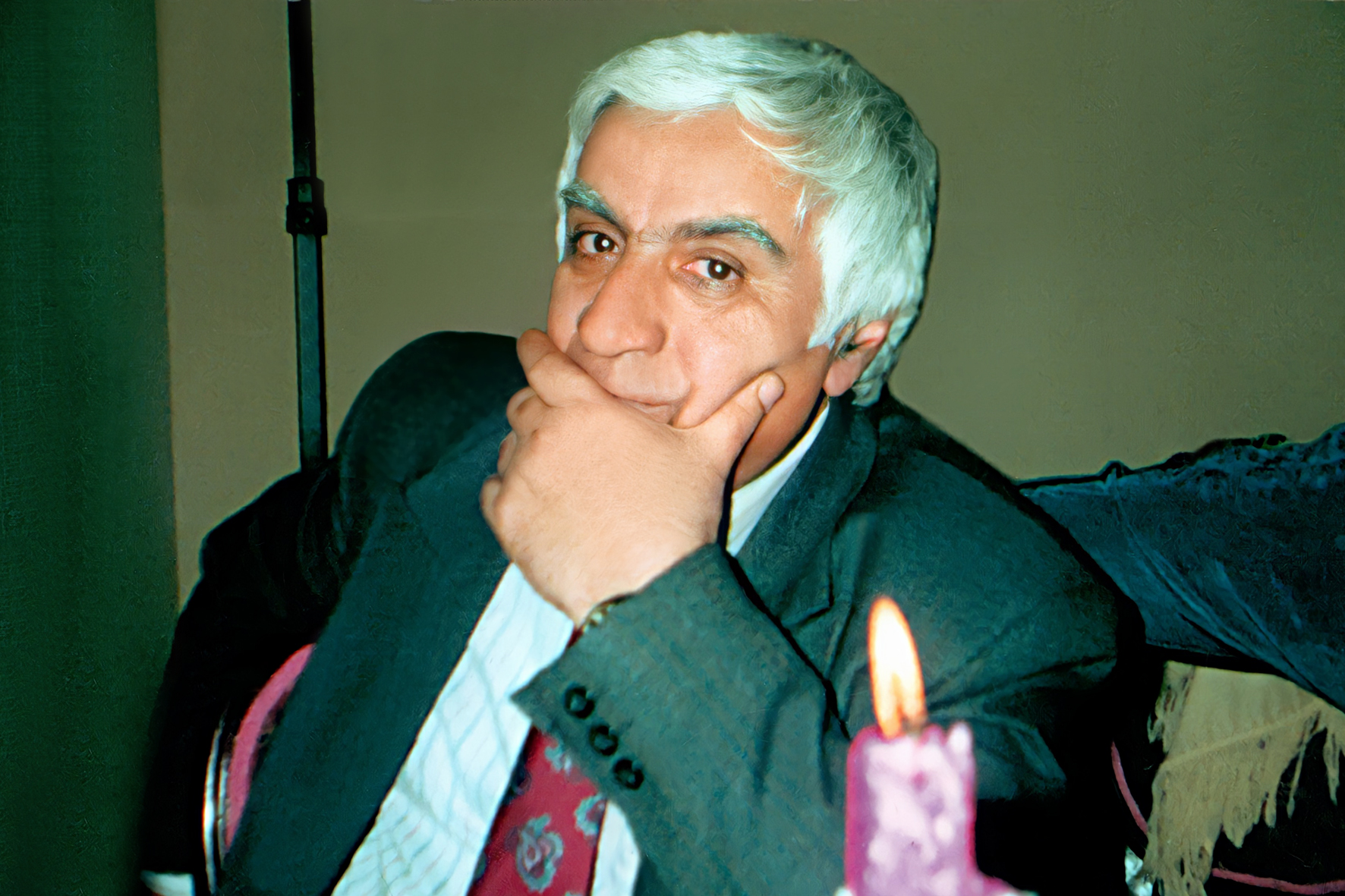
- Born: Gorkhmaz Askerbeyli; April 16, 1932; Ganja, Azerbaijan
- Died: April 22, 2010 (aged 78); Baku, Azerbaijan
- Notable work: Bahram Gur fountain, Nizami mausoleum

Gorkhmaz Sujaddinov (Askerbeyli) (Azerbaijani: Qorxmaz Məmməd Tağı oğlu Sücəddinov (Əsgərbəyli); 16 April 1932, Ganja—22 April 2010, Baku) was an Azerbaijani-Soviet sculptor and an Honored Artist of Azerbaijan SSR (1982).

== Biography ==
Gorkhmaz Sujaddinov was born on April 16, 1932, into the family of Mamed Tagi Askerbeyli, professor of the Department of Soil Science at the Agricultural Institute in Ganja of the Azerbaijan SSR.

In 1937, Gorkhmaz's father was repressed following a false delation and subsequently died in a camp in the Komi ASSR. He was posthumously exonerated after the death of Stalin during the Khrushchev Thaw.

The boy’s grandmother, fearing that the son of the "enemy of the people" would forever remain an outcast, changed her grandson's surname to her own, Sujaddinov, and moved him to Baku, where he was brought up in the family of his uncle Yagub Sujaddinov.

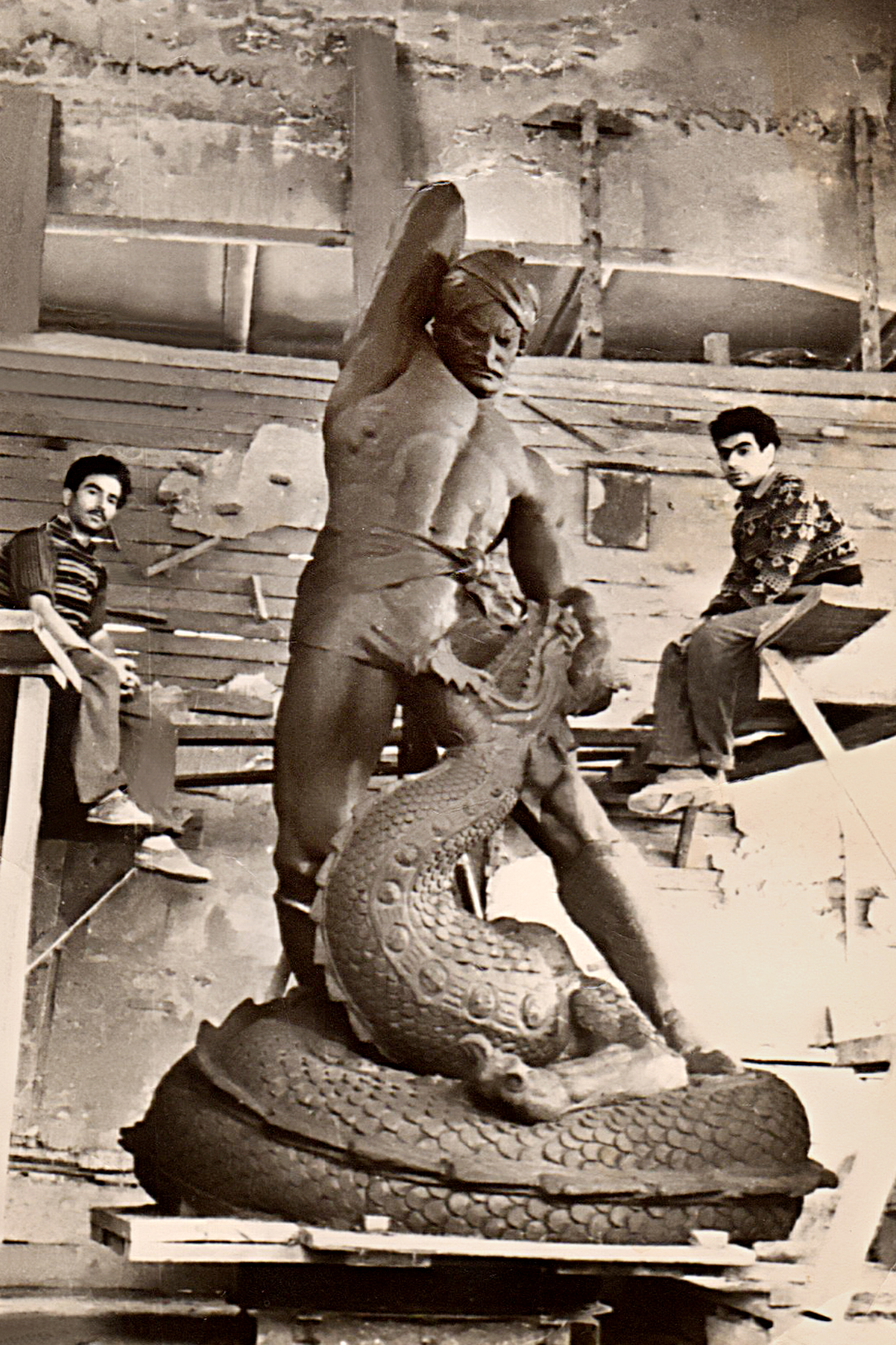

Despite the difficult living conditions in the post-war period, the boy displayed an interest in drawing and began his studies at the A. Azimzade Art School. Following a successful graduation from college, Gorkhmaz enrolled at the Institute of Applied and Decorative Arts in Lviv, from where he transferred to the Academy of Arts in Tbilisi, where the famous sculptor Konstantin Mikhailovich Merabishvili became his mentor and tutor.

Gorkhmaz Sujaddinov’s first professional work, the decorative fountain "Bahram Gur", is considered today one of the symbols of the city of Baku. One of his last works is a tombstone and memorial plaque to the People's Artist of Azerbaijan Nasiba Zeynalova. Between these is an entire gallery of monumental and easel works, among which is the composition "Khamsa” at the mausoleum of Nizami Ganjavi based on the works of the great poet, the monument "Vidadi and Vagif" in Qazax, a portrait bas-relief of Samad Vurgun on the facade of the Russian Drama Theater in Baku, the decorative composition "Absheron” in Zuğulba, and many others.

During his life, Gorkhmaz Sujaddinov participated in numerous exhibitions, and his works are kept in museums and private collections both in Azerbaijan and abroad, including works made of bronze and wood: "Music", "Reflections", portraits of Füzuli, Khaqani, Dede Korkut, Javad Khan and Richard Sorge.

For various reasons, not all the master’s works have survived to this day. The "Girl with a Cup", a monumental aluminum statue that stood at the entrance to Ganja, disappeared without a trace in the early 1990s, and the monuments to Lenin and Gatyr Mammad were dismantled according to ideological considerations.

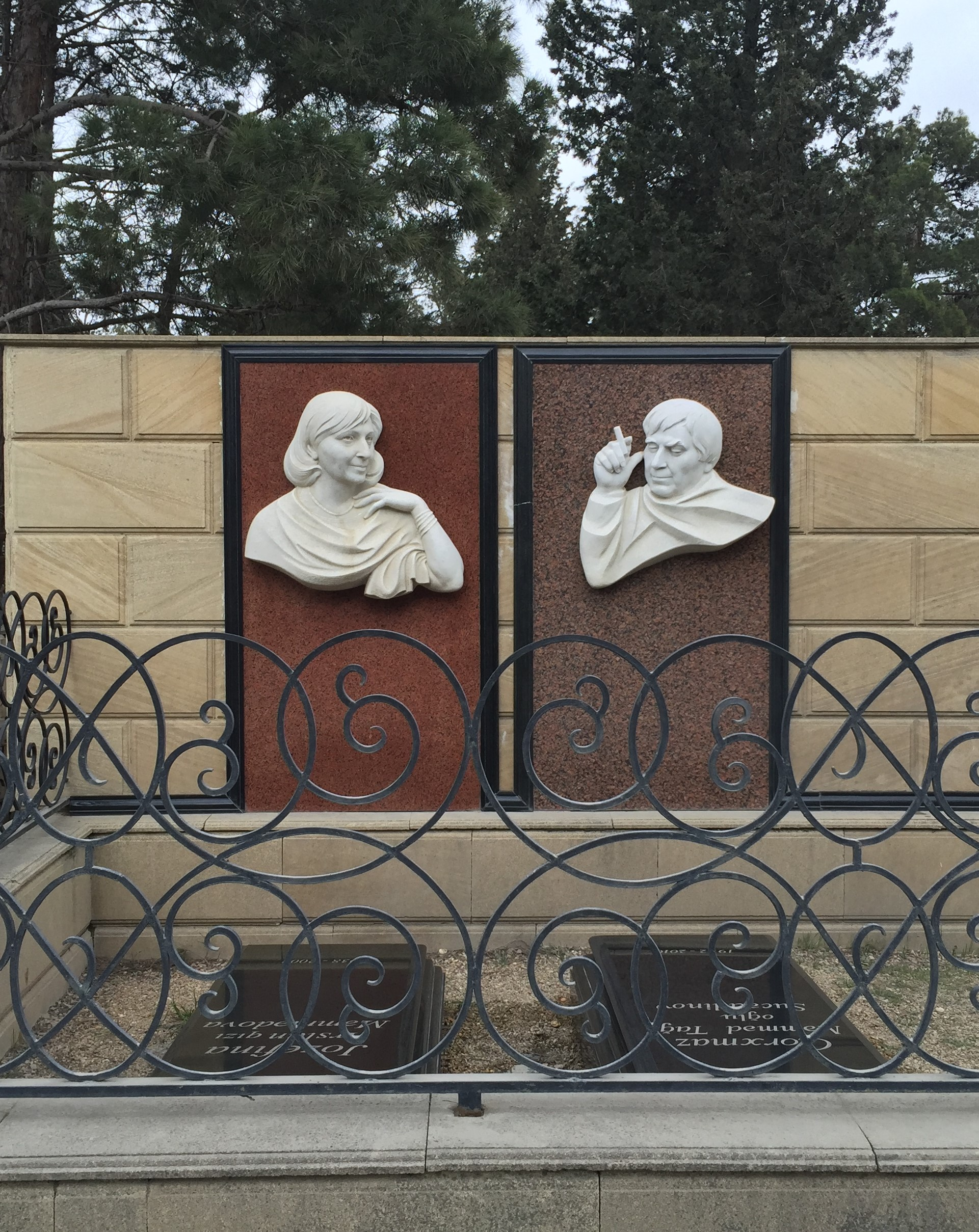
mini

During the Soviet era, Gorkhmaz Sujaddinov spent many years teaching drawing at the Department of Fine Arts of the Faculty of Architecture of the Polytechnic Institute in Baku. In the 1990s, he continued teaching in Turkey, first at the Faculty of Fine Arts at Atatürk University in Erzurum, and then at the Faculty of Fine Arts at Erciyes University in Kayseri, where he was the head of the Department of Painting and Sculpture. During his stay in Turkey, he created portrait monuments of prominent figures of this country: Mustafa Kemal Ataturk, Mimar Sinan, and Yunus Emre.

He died and was buried in Baku, beside his wife.

== Family ==
Spouse - Josephina Mamedova
Son - Vahid Sujaddinov
Granddaughters - Fidan Sujaddinova,
Mariam Sujaddinova

== Gallery ==
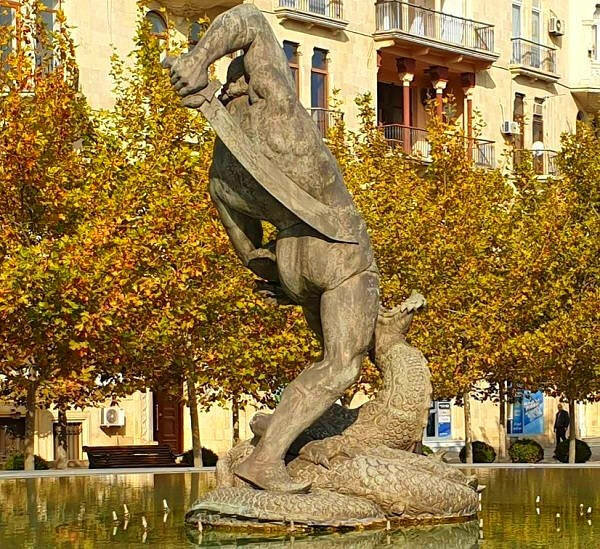
Bakhram Gur

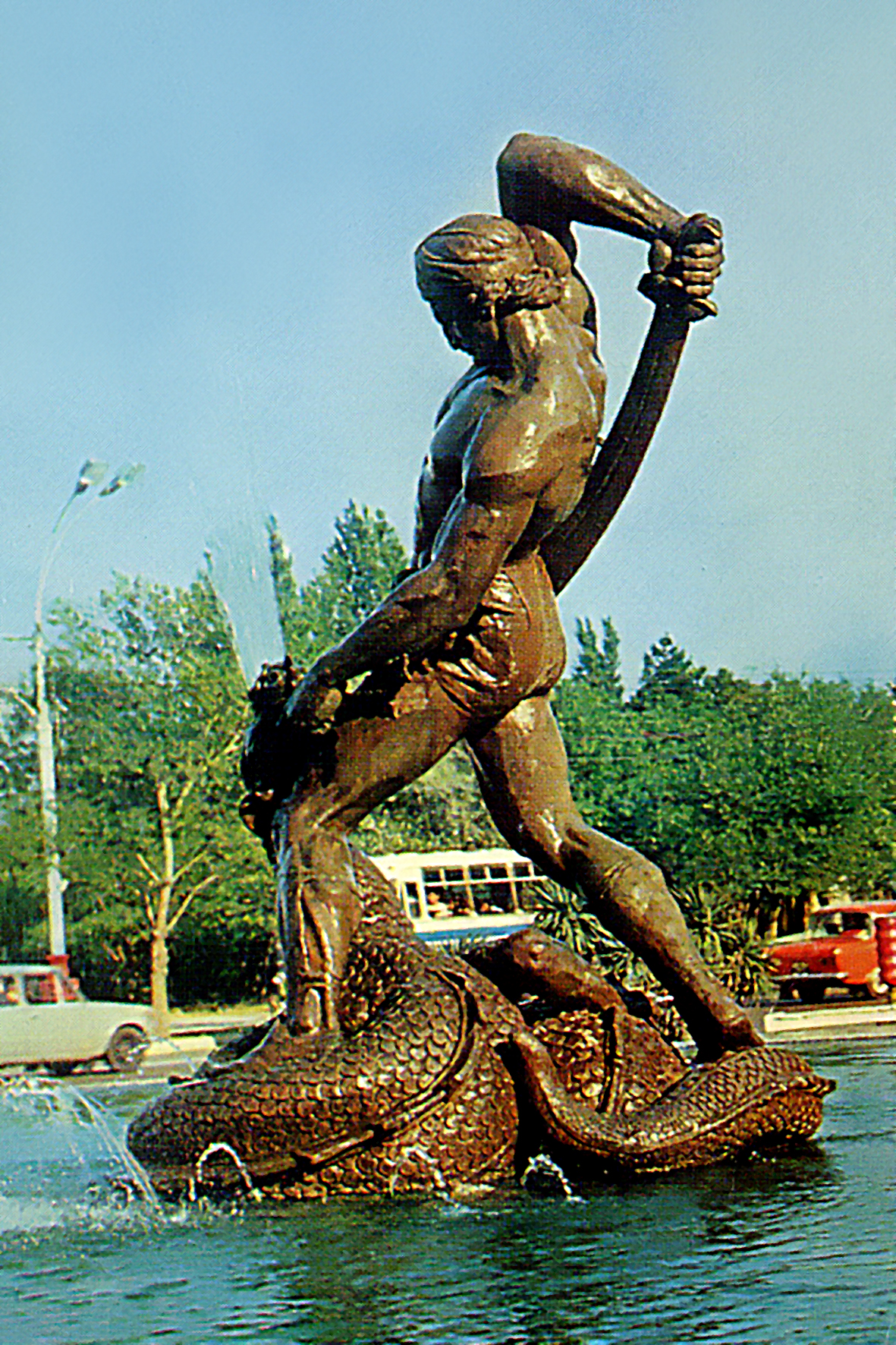
Bakhram Gur

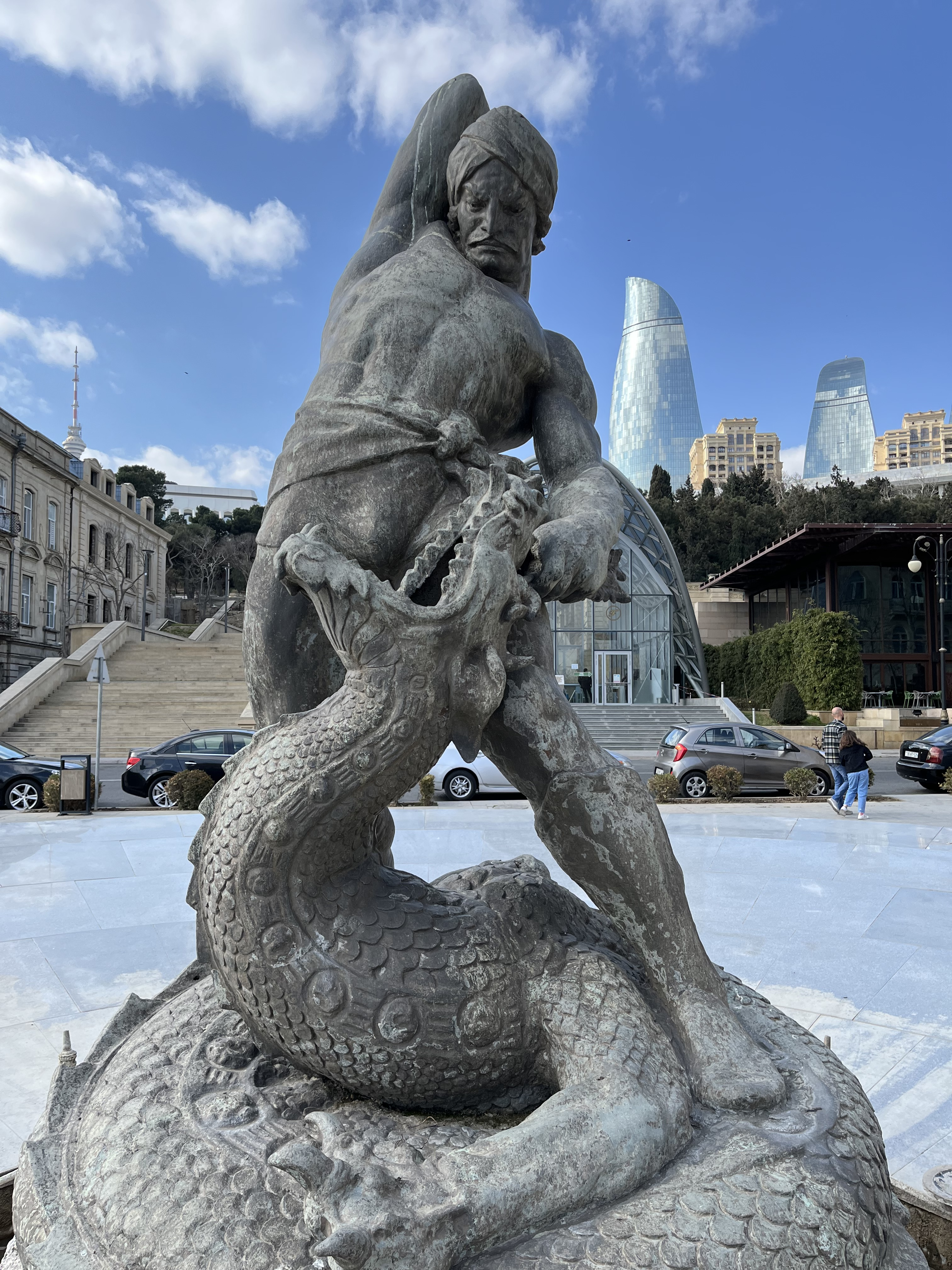
Bakhram Gur

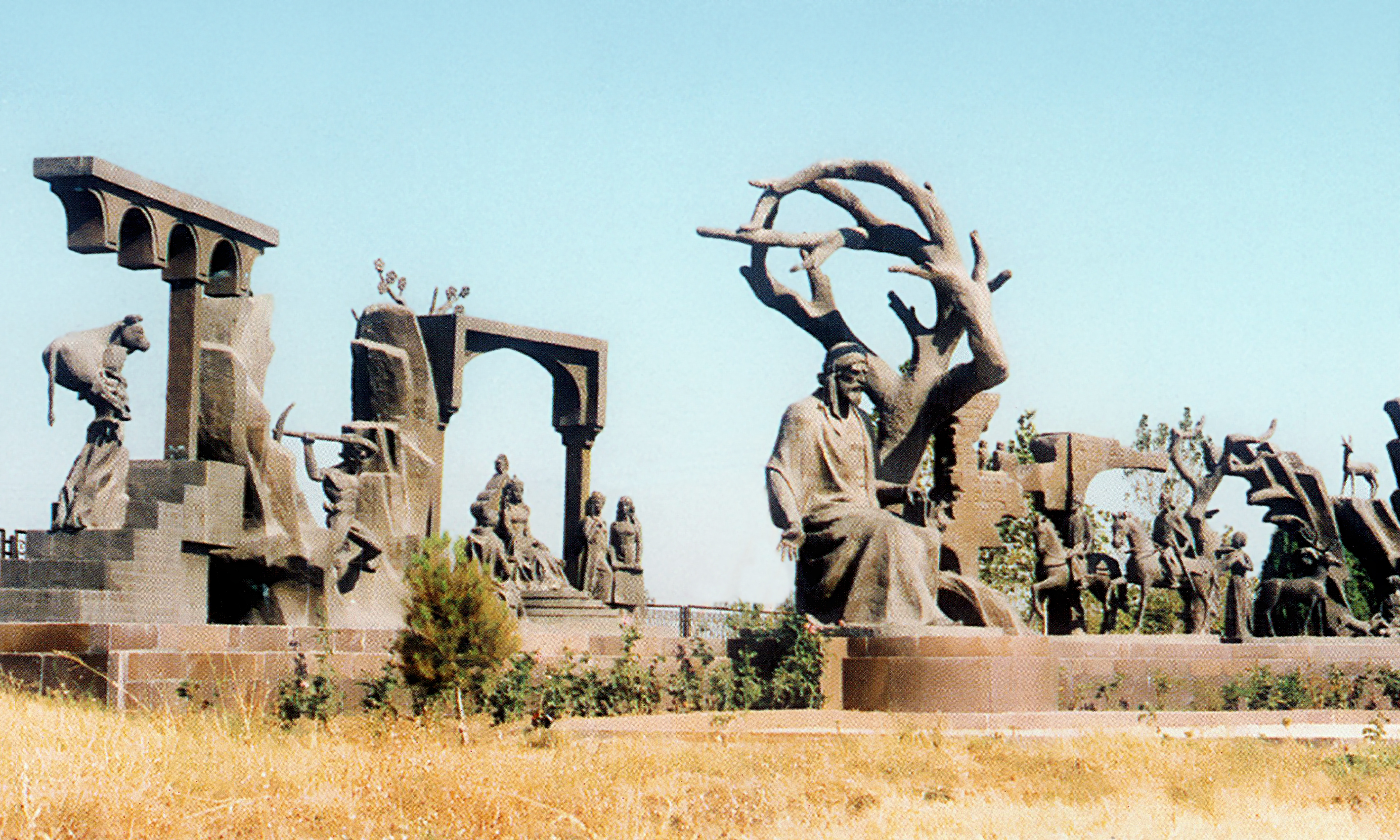
Nizami Mausoleum

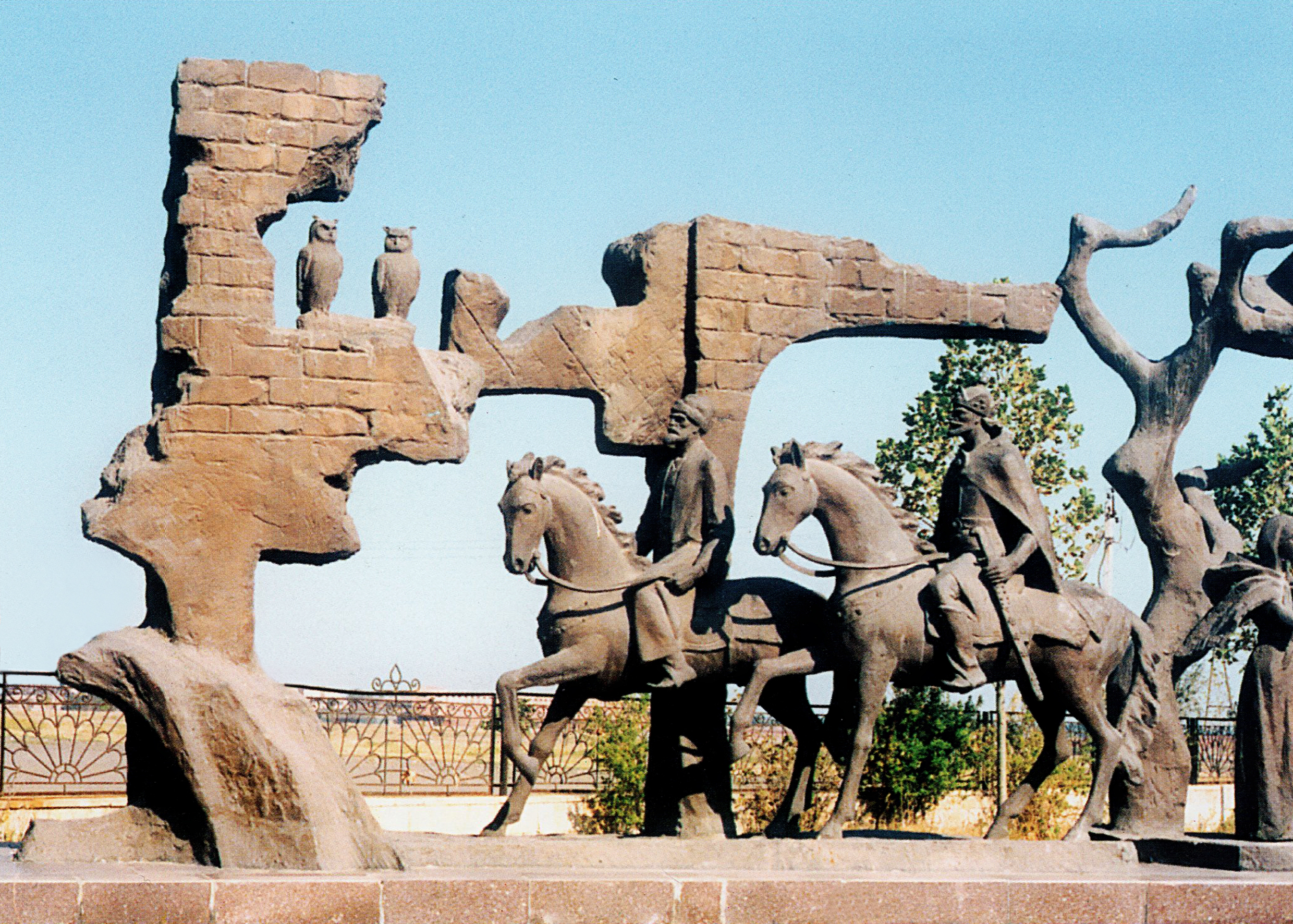
Nizami Mausoleum (fragment)

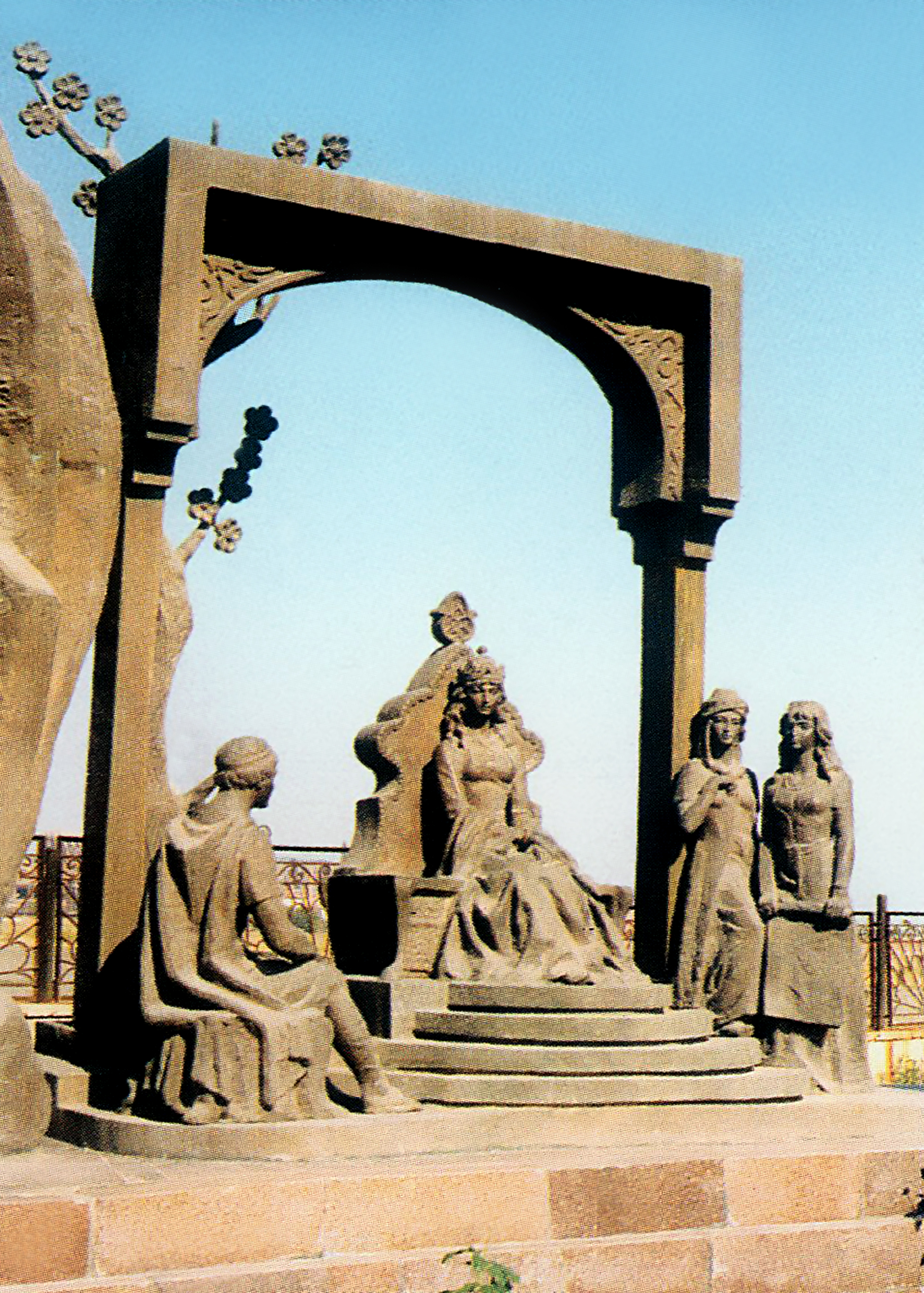
Nizami Mausoleum (fragment)

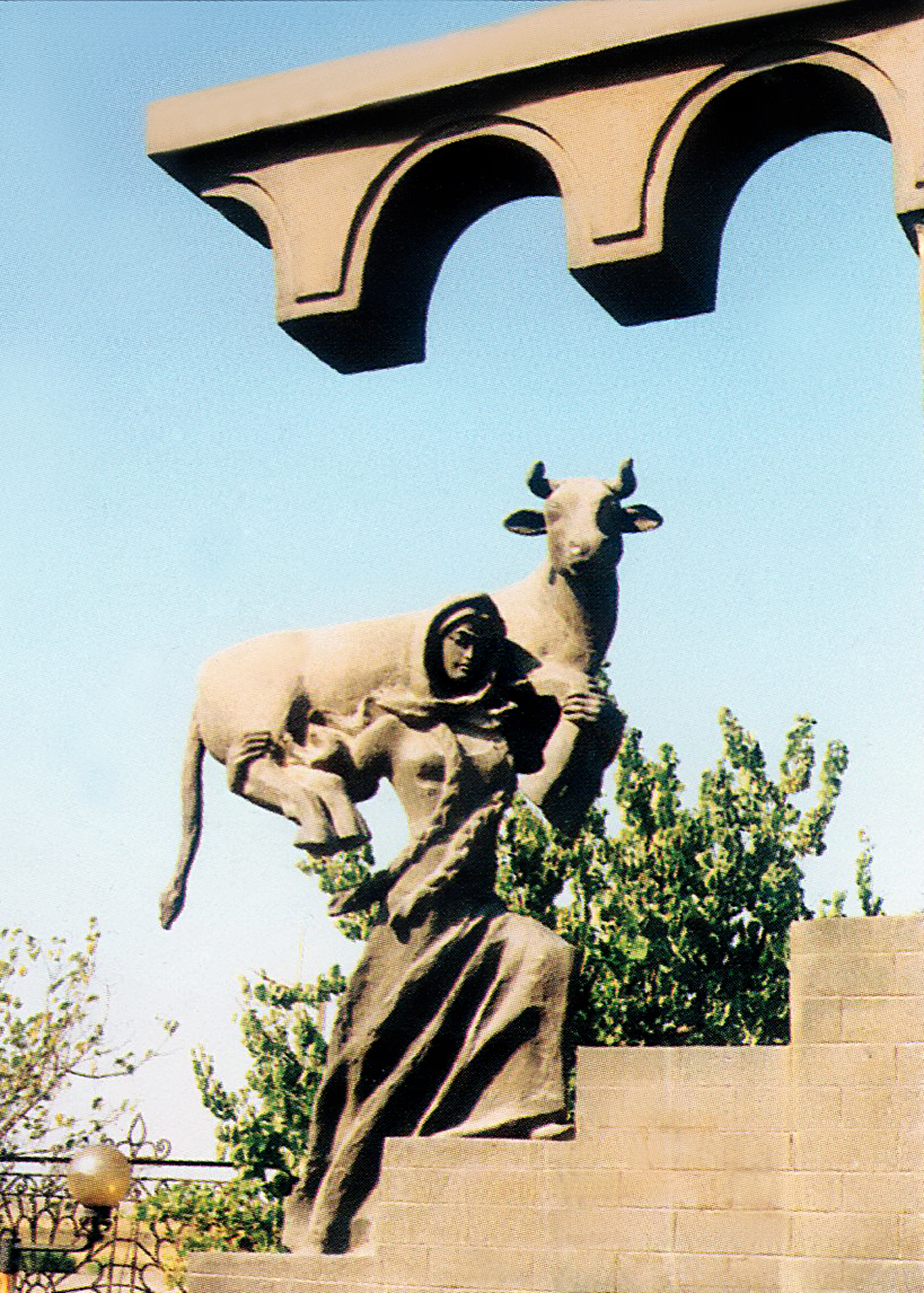
Nizami Mausoleum (fragment)

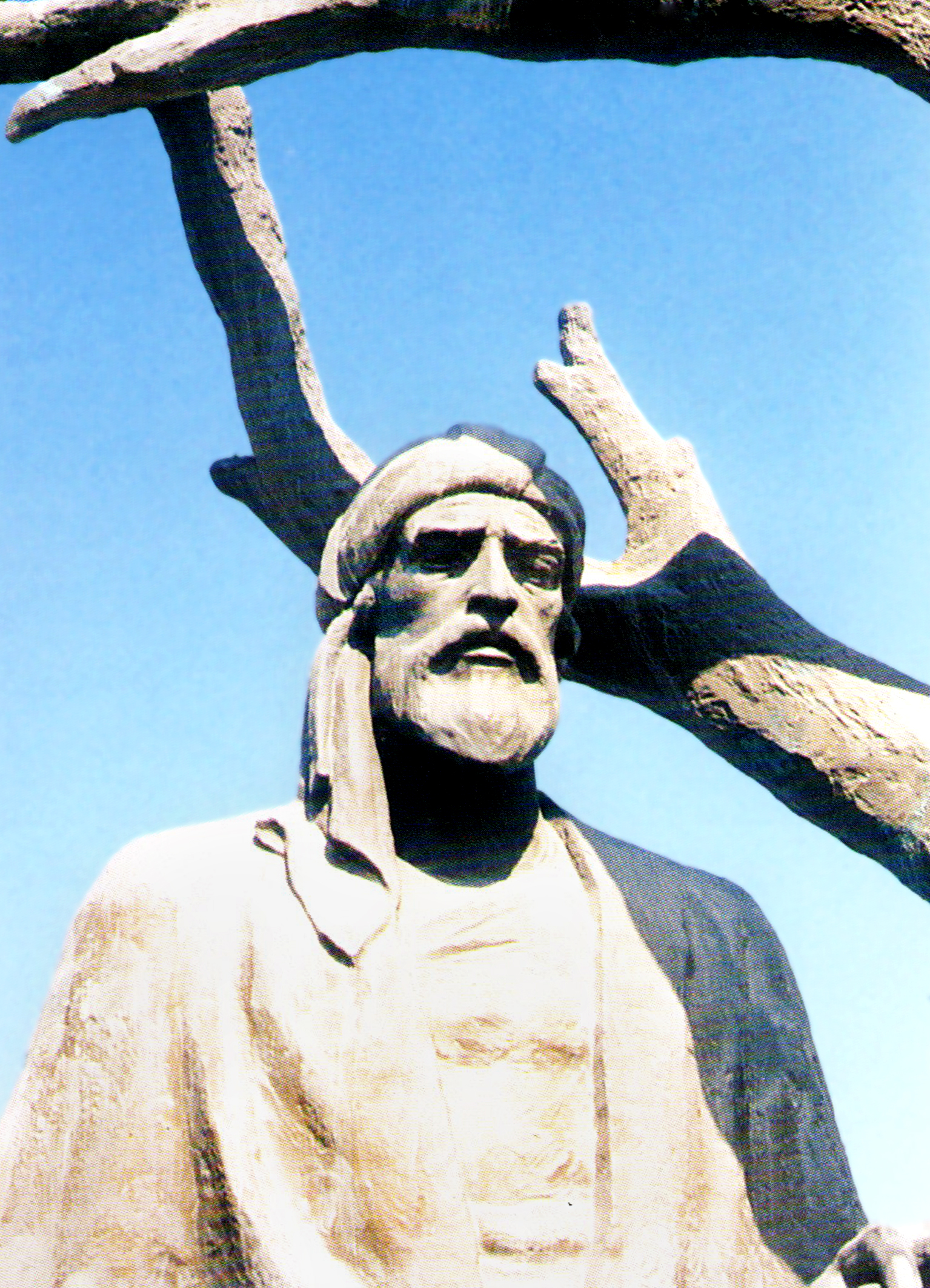
Nizami Mausoleum (fragment)

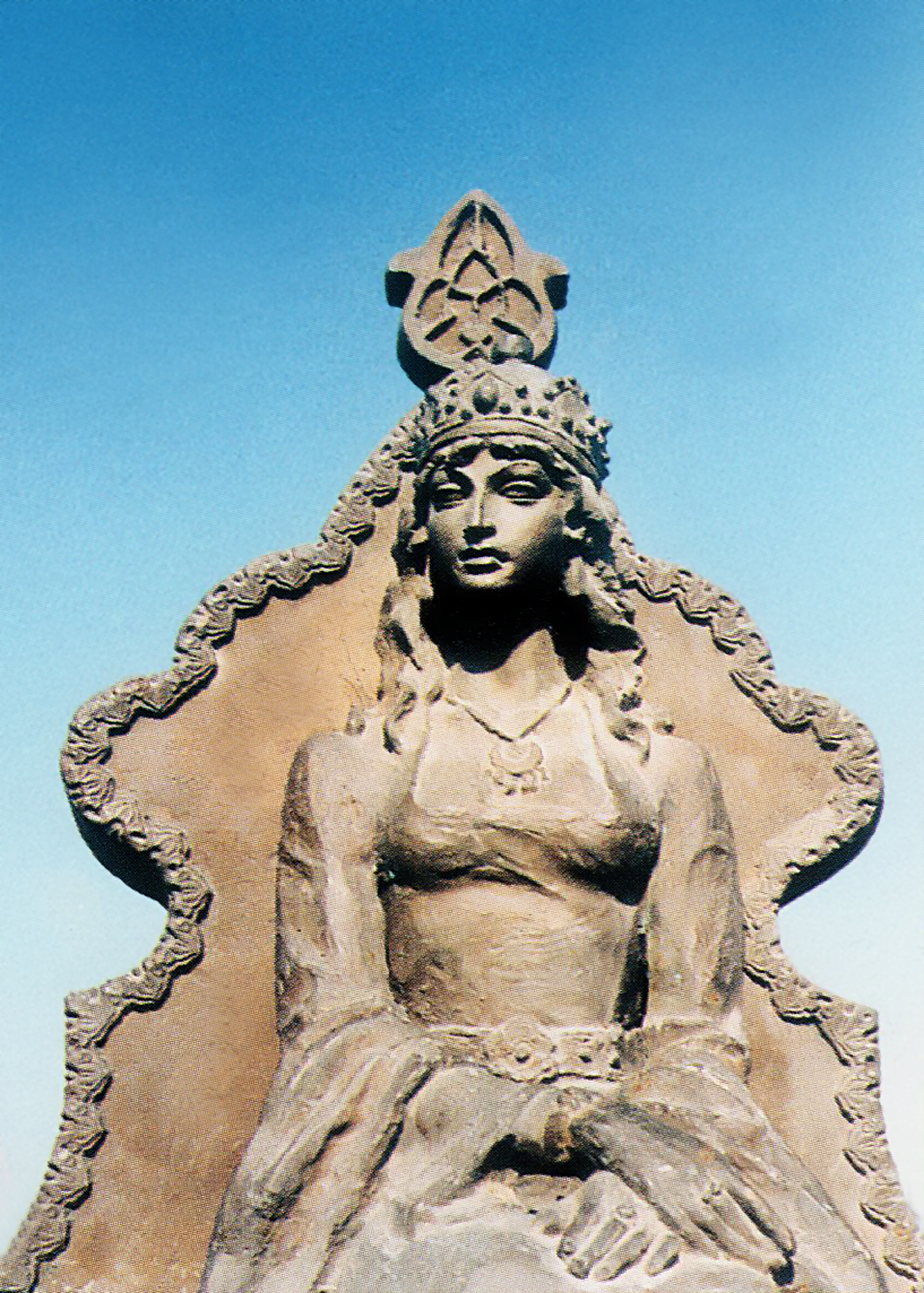
Nizami Mausoleum (fragment)

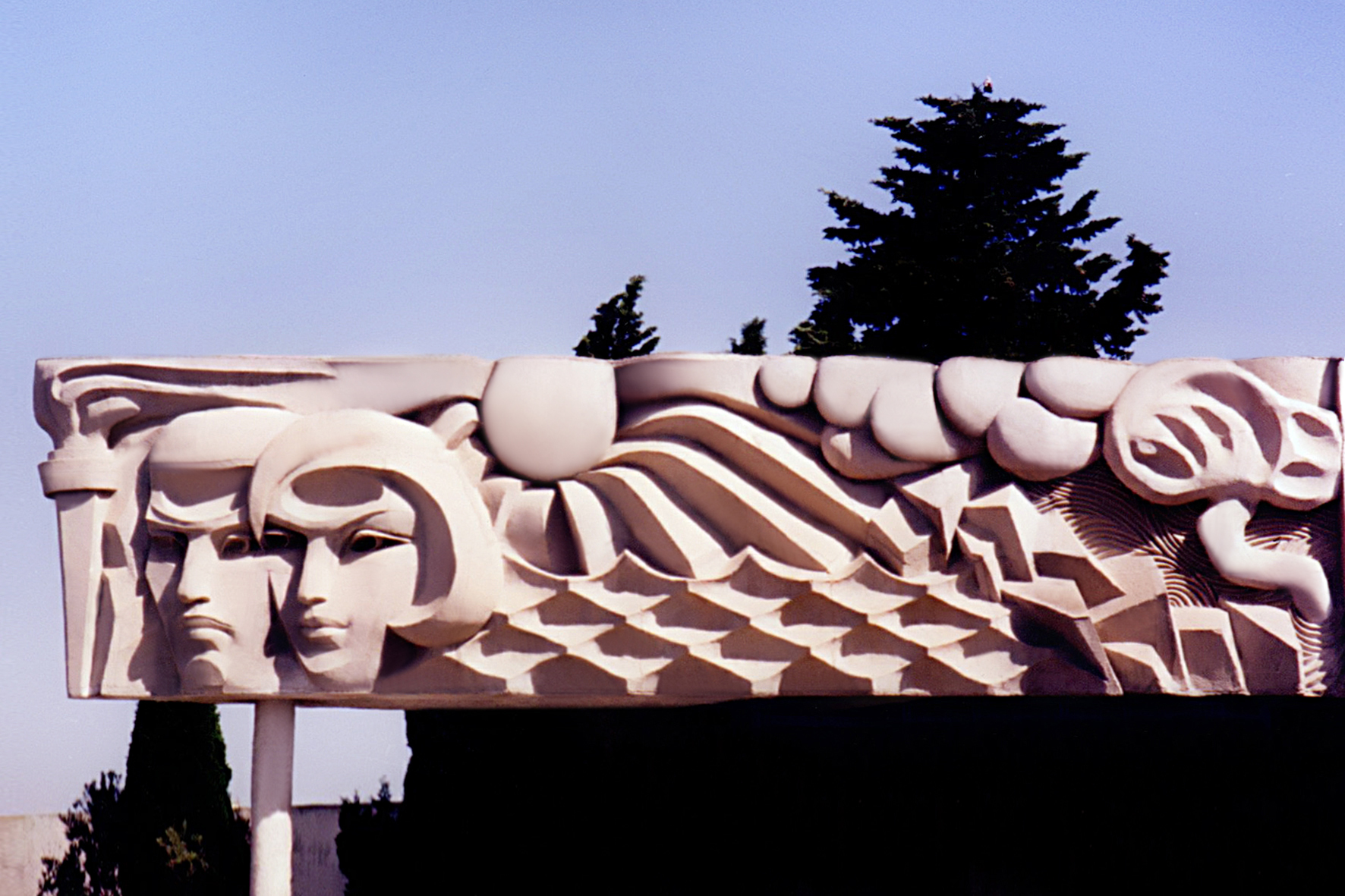
Absheron

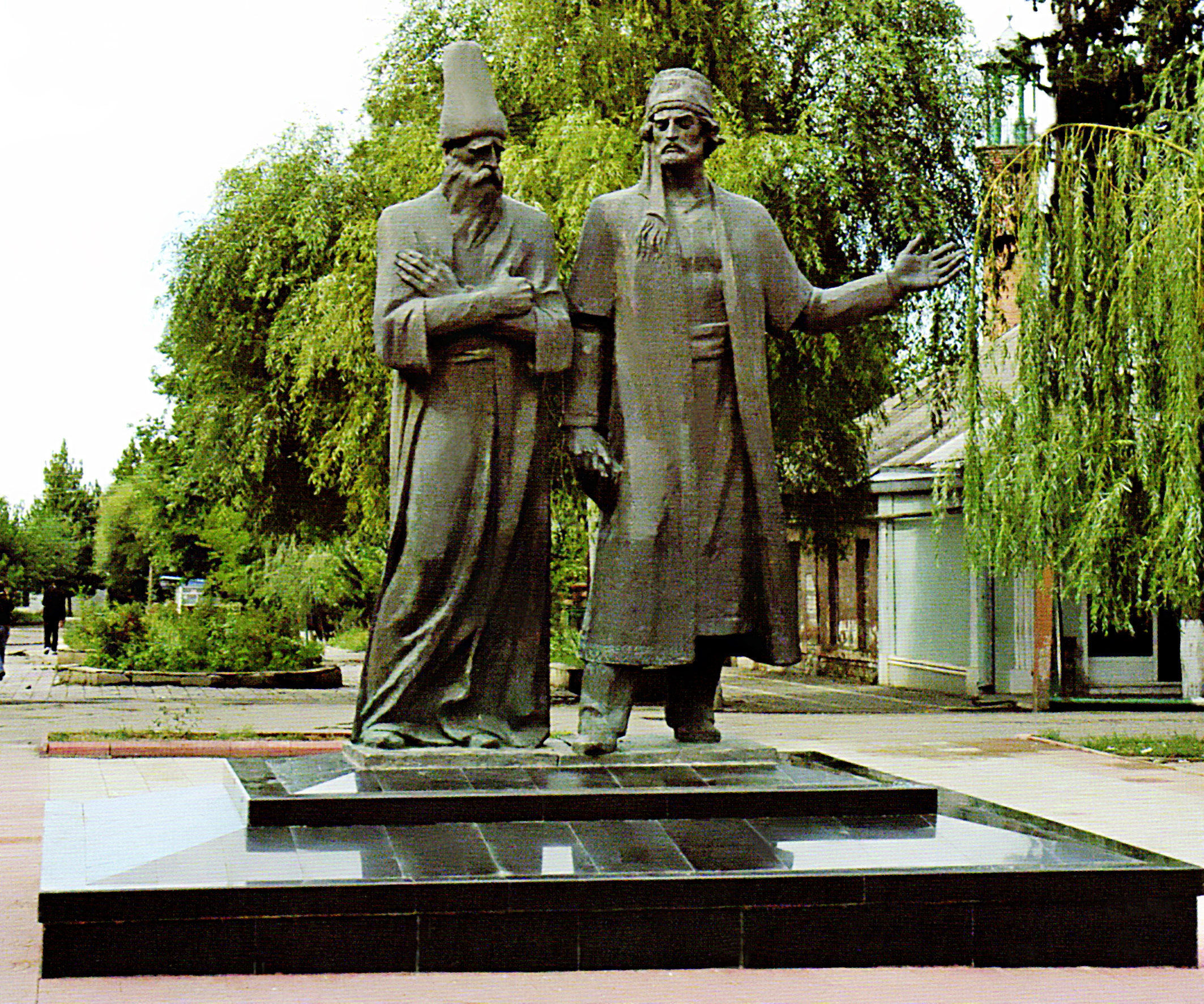
Vidadi & Vagif

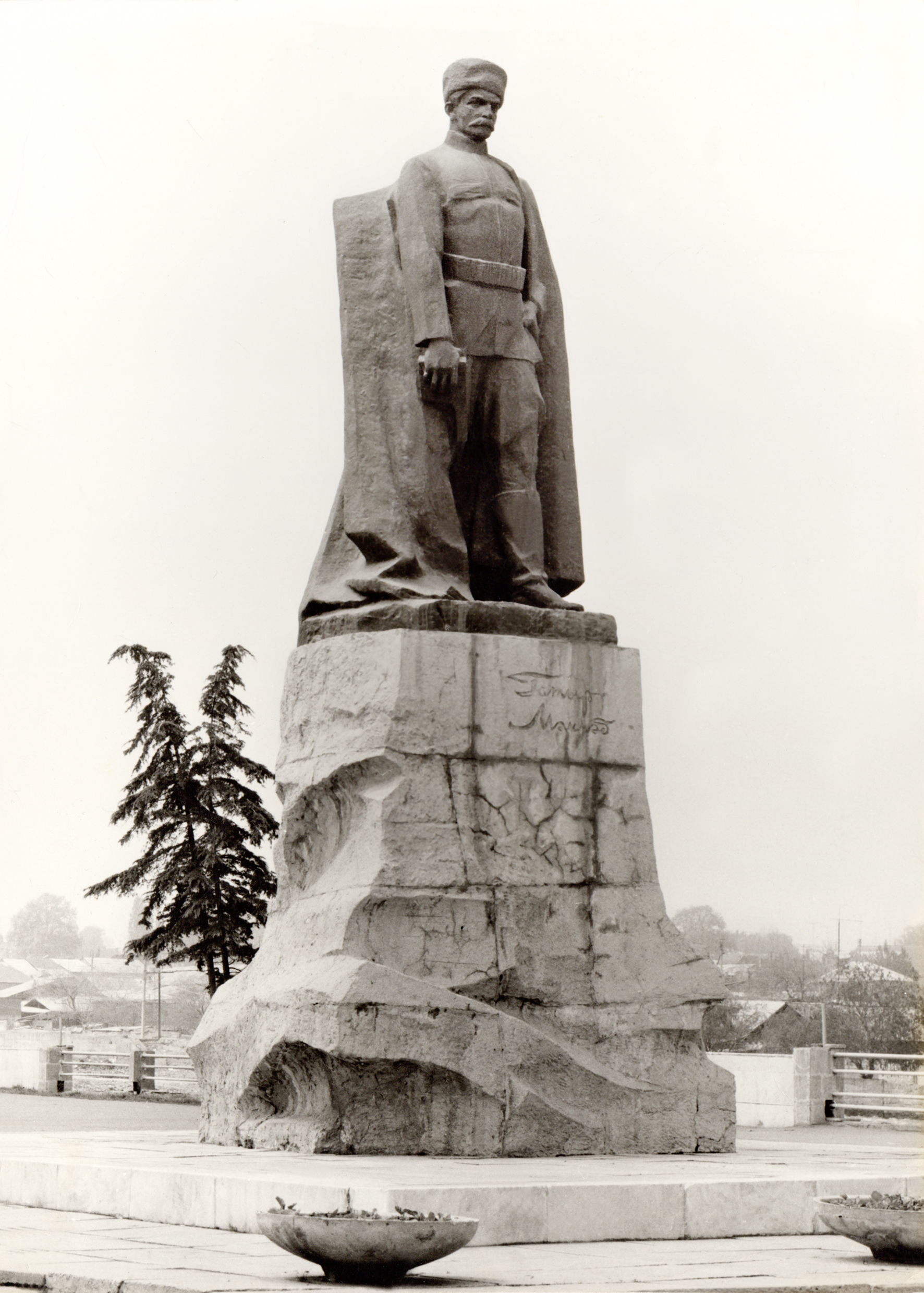
Qatir Mammad

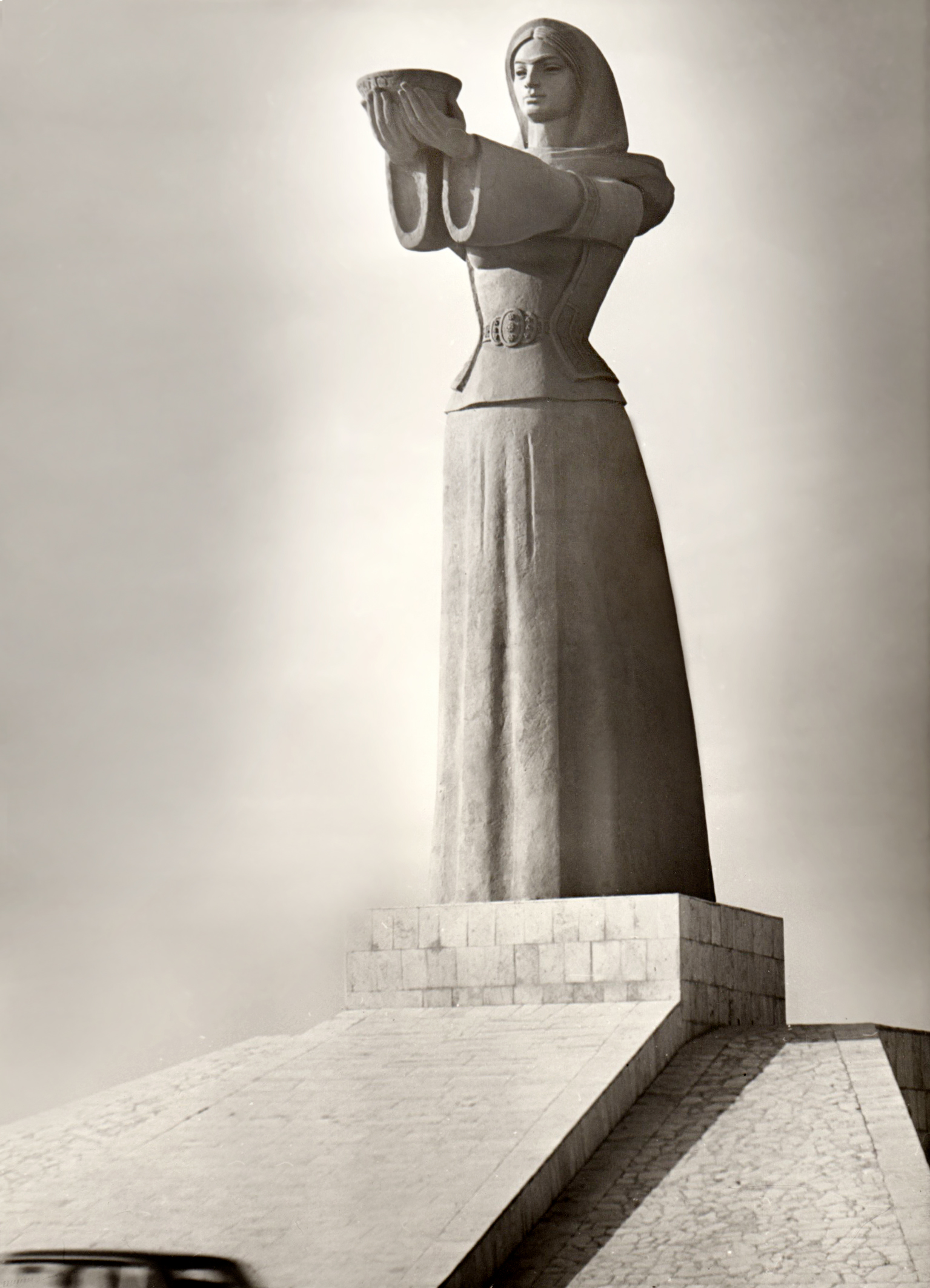
Girl with a Cup

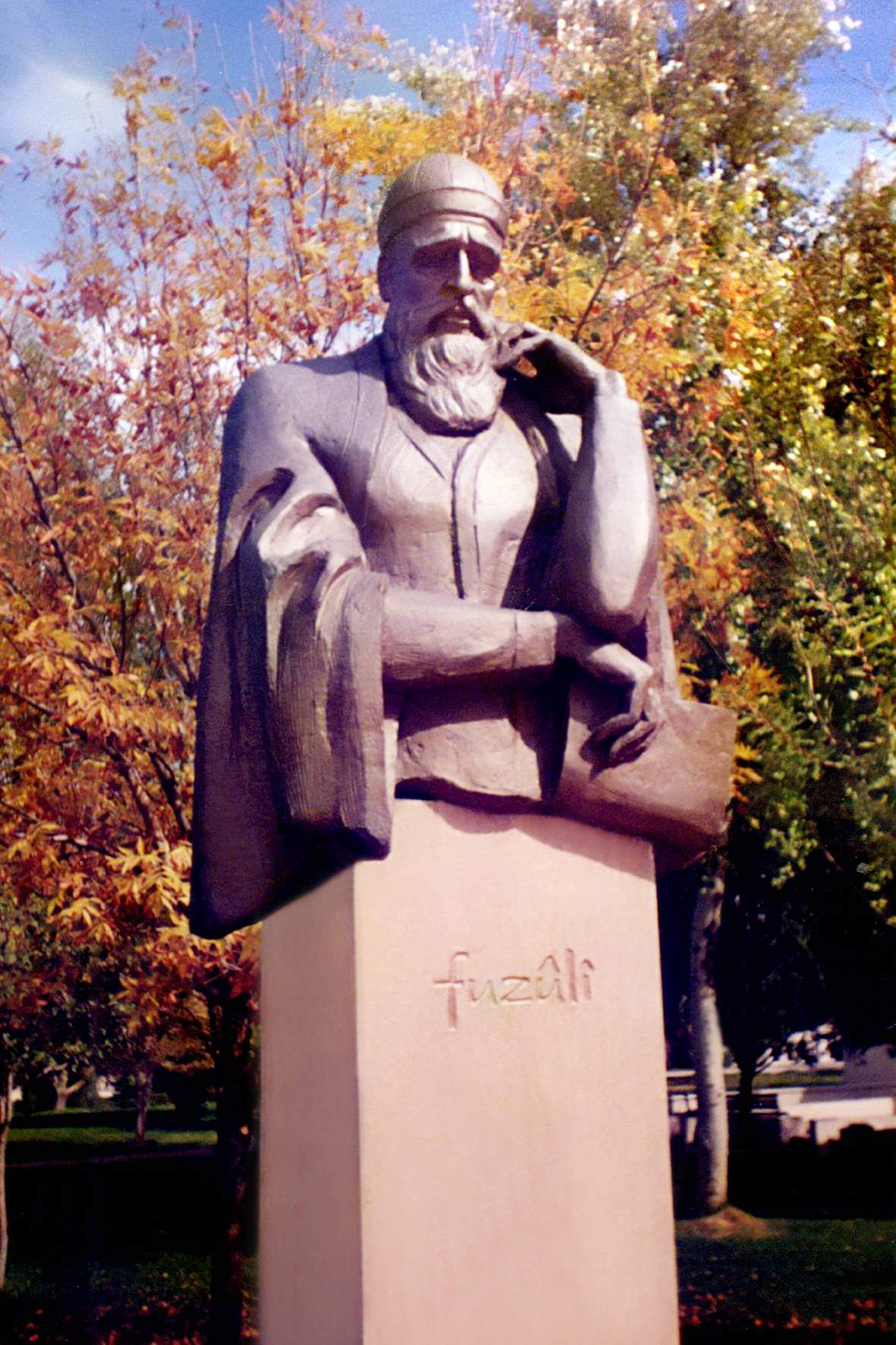
Fizuli

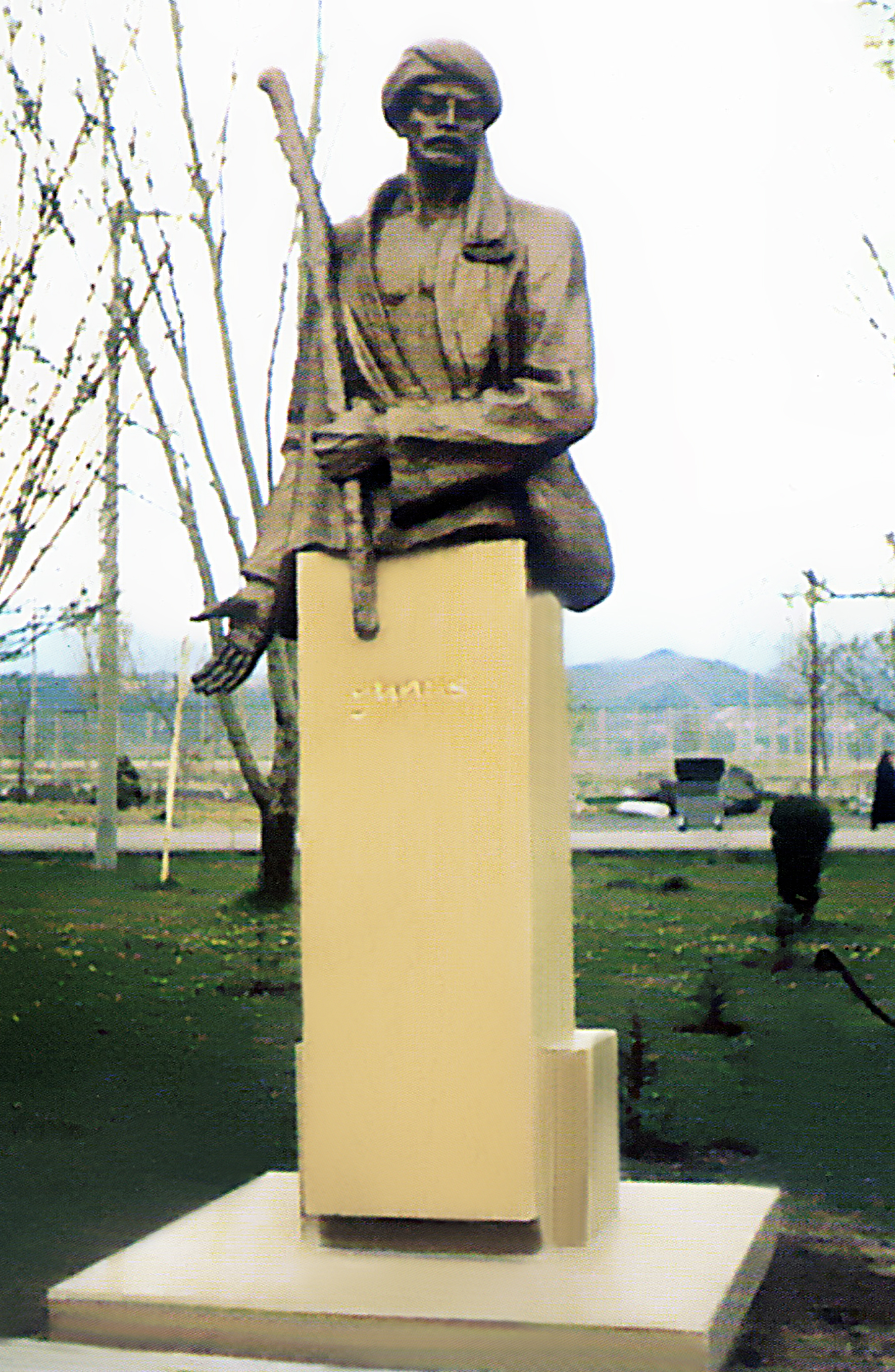
Yunis Emre

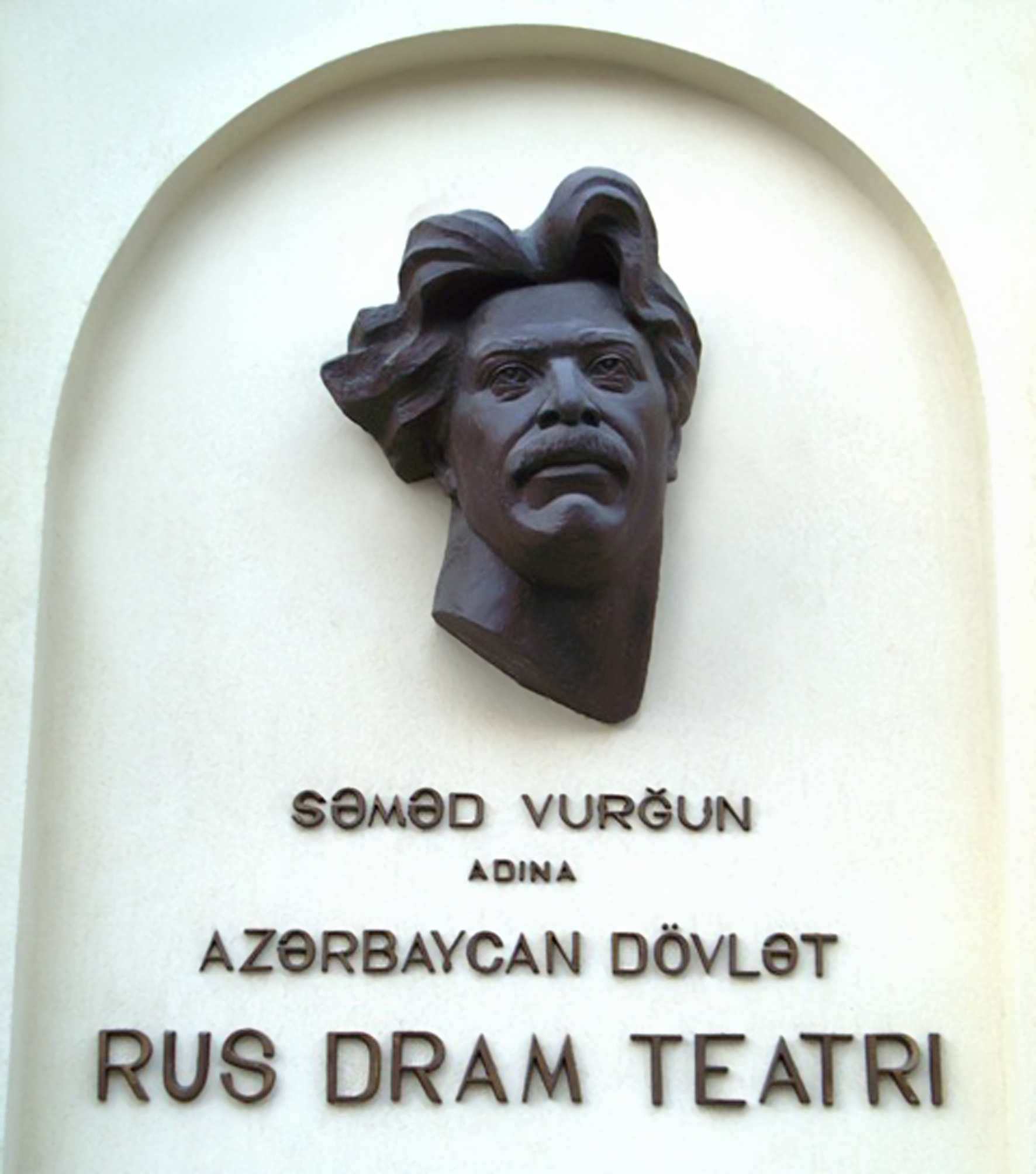
Samed Vurgun

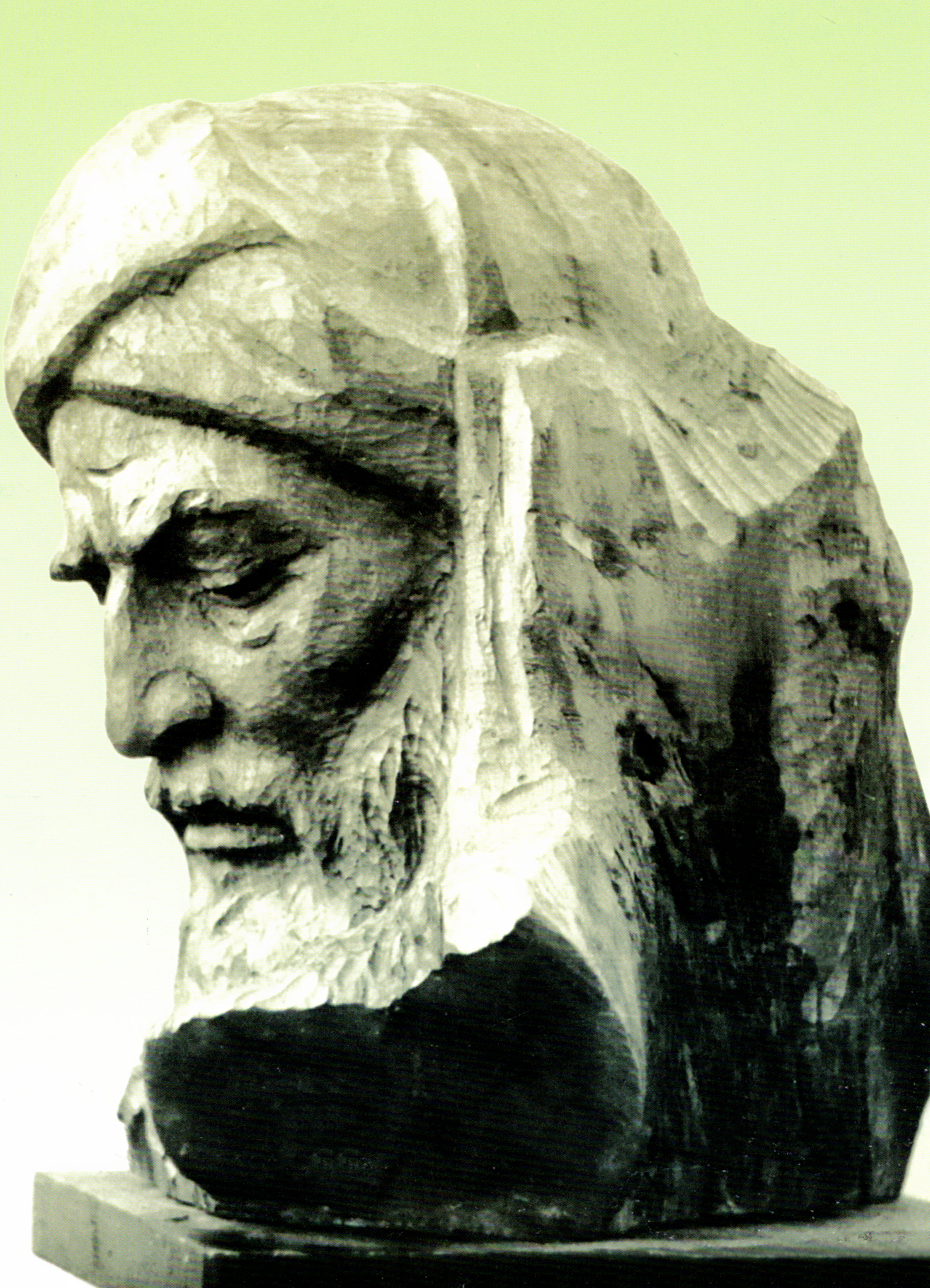
Khagany

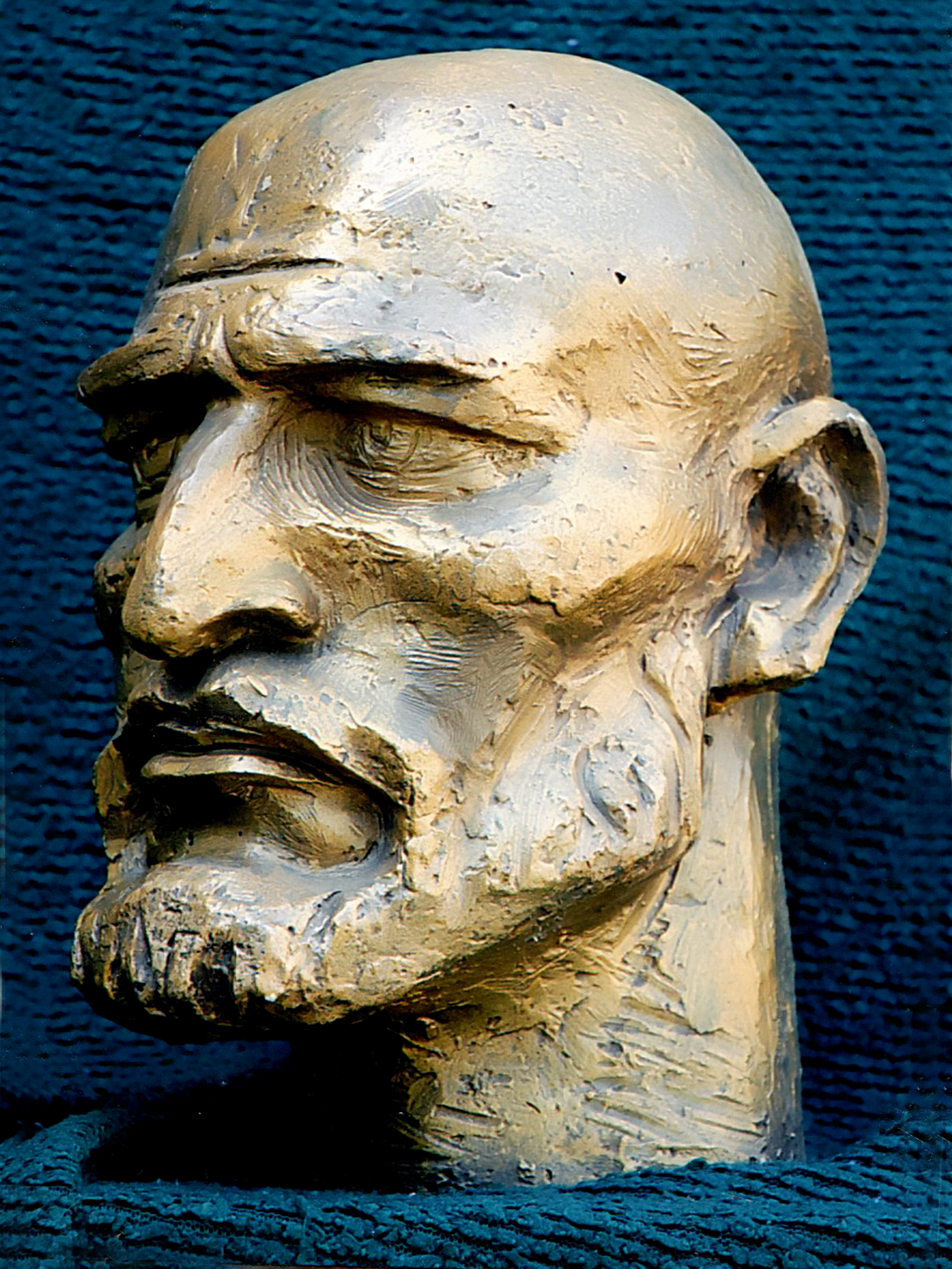
Javad Khan

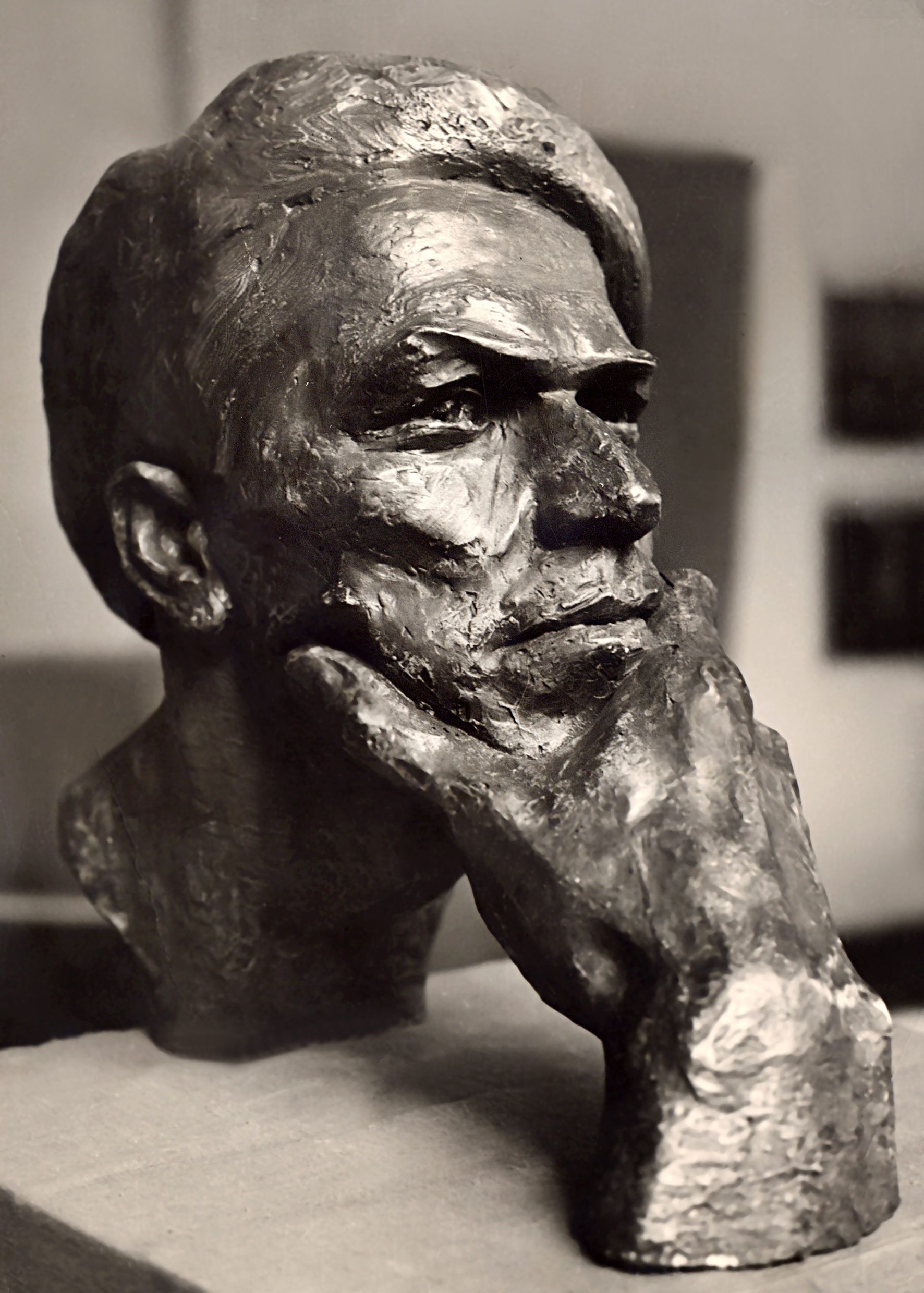
Portret of a Man

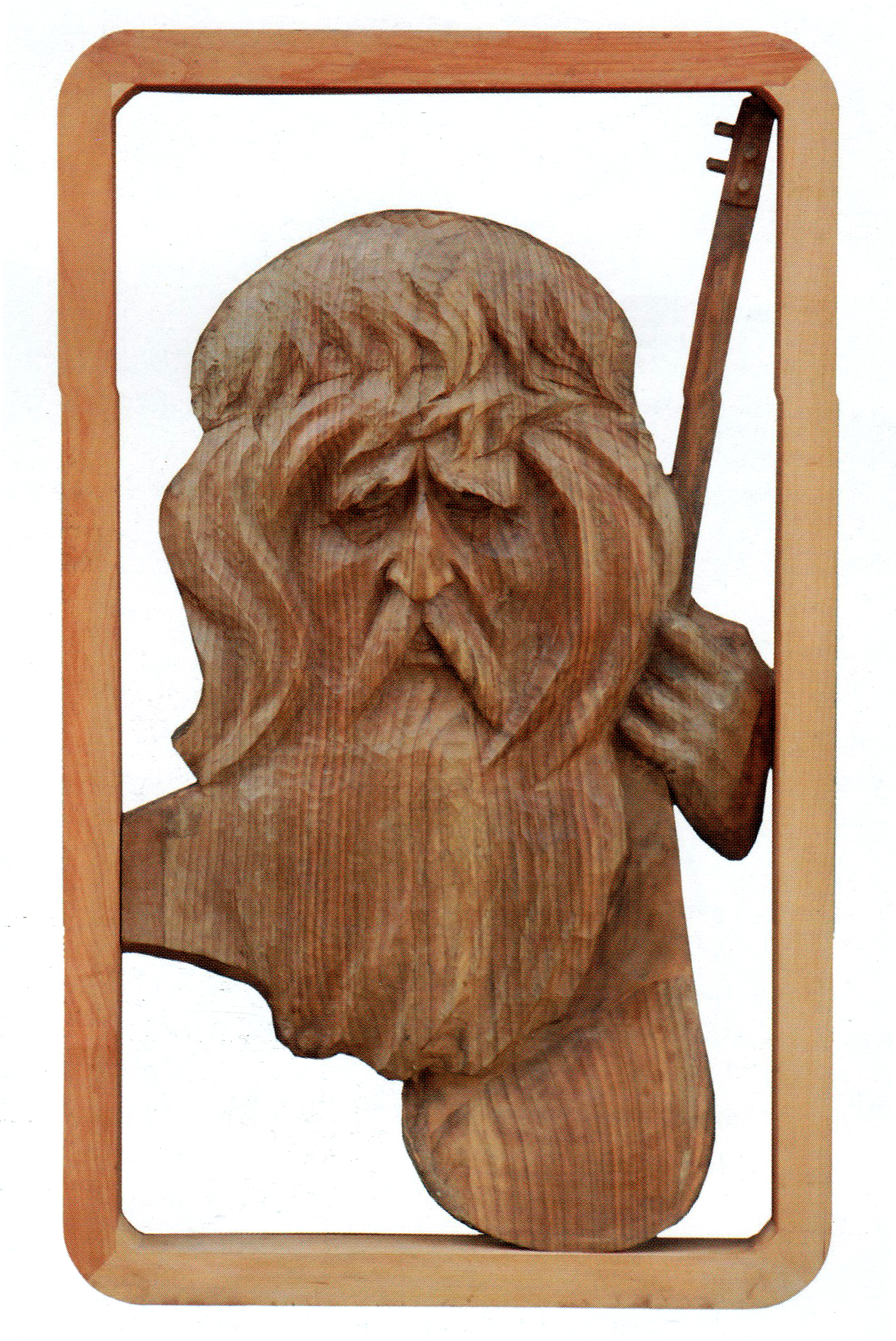
Dede Korkut

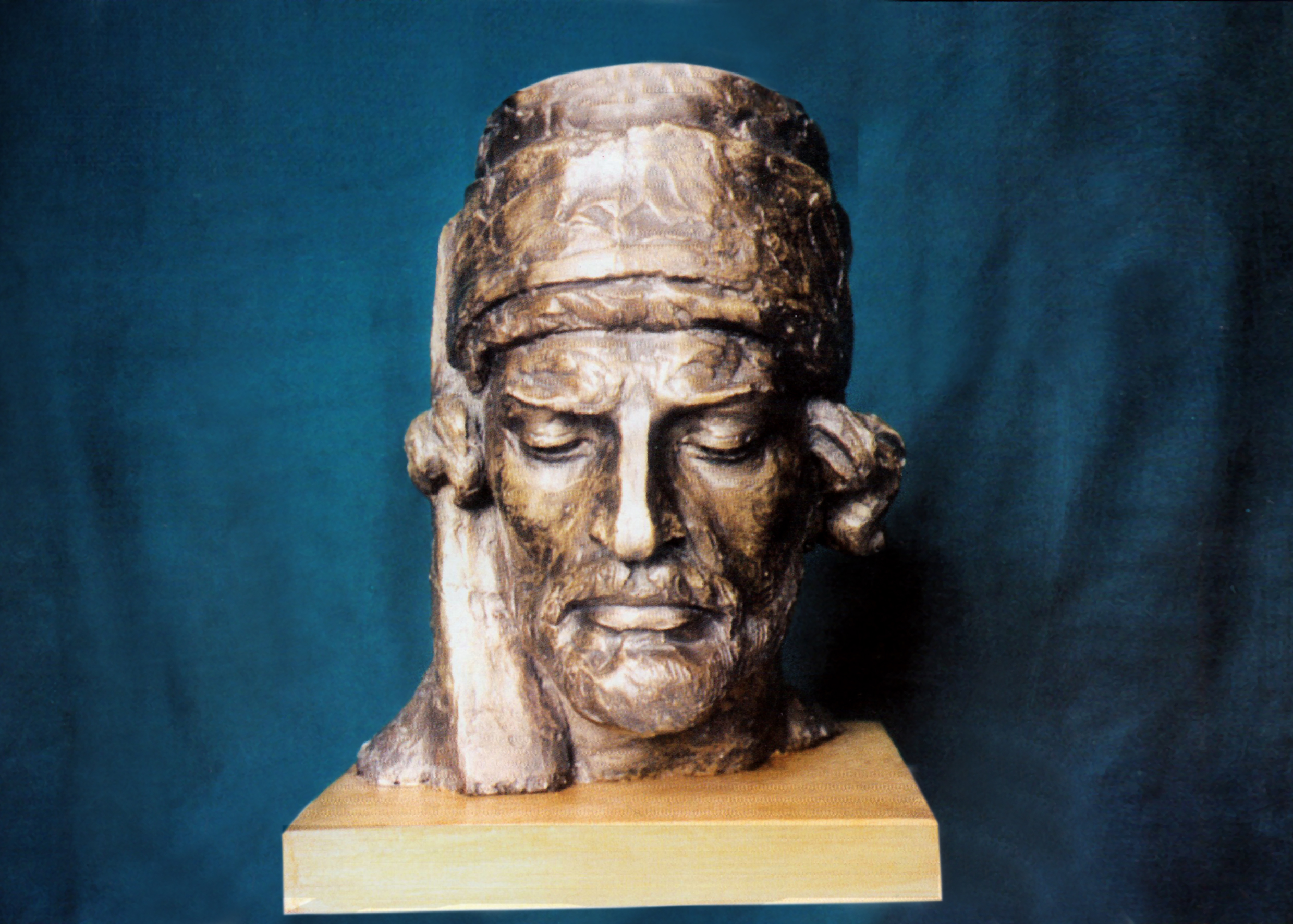
Vagif

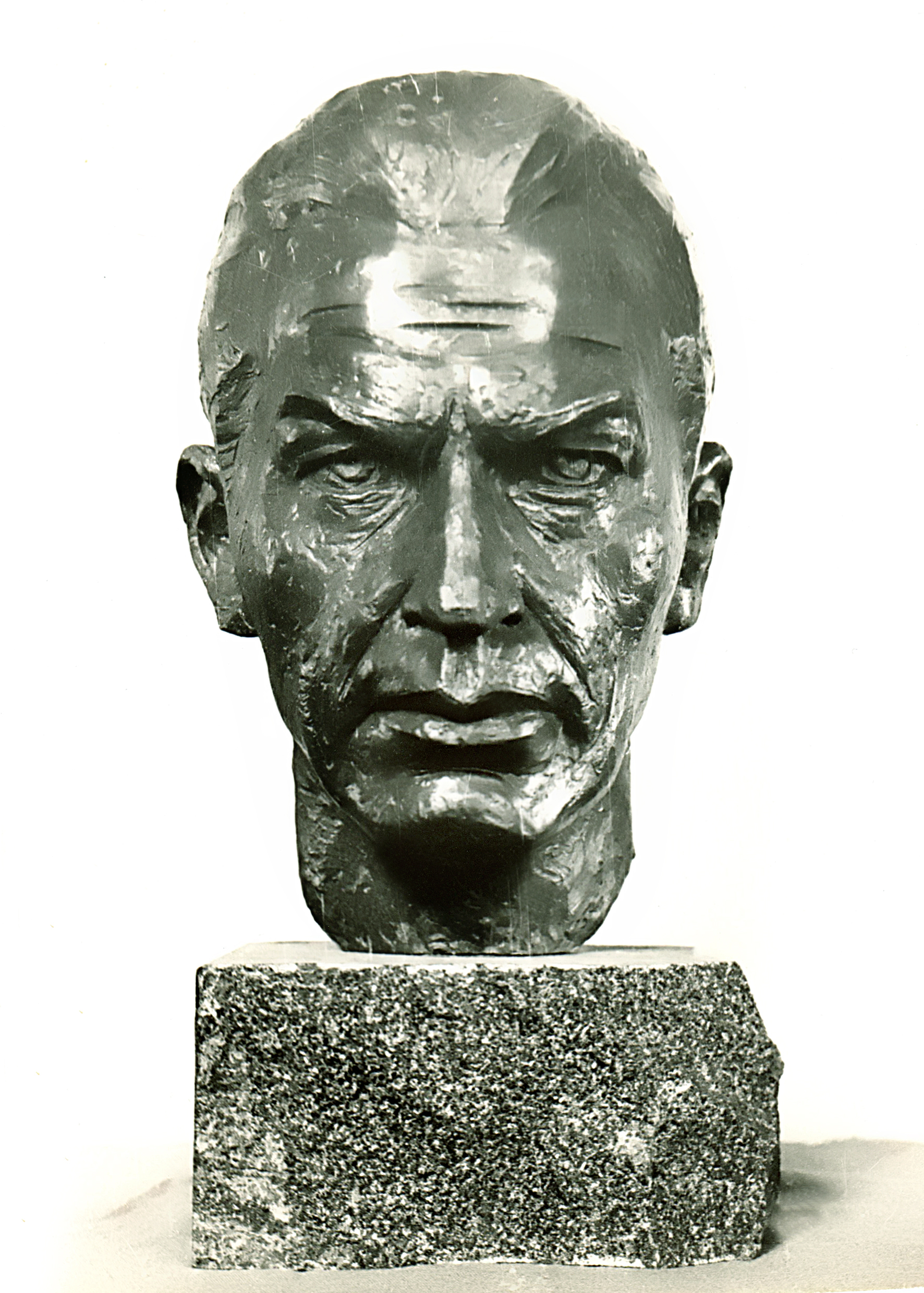
Rikhard Zorge

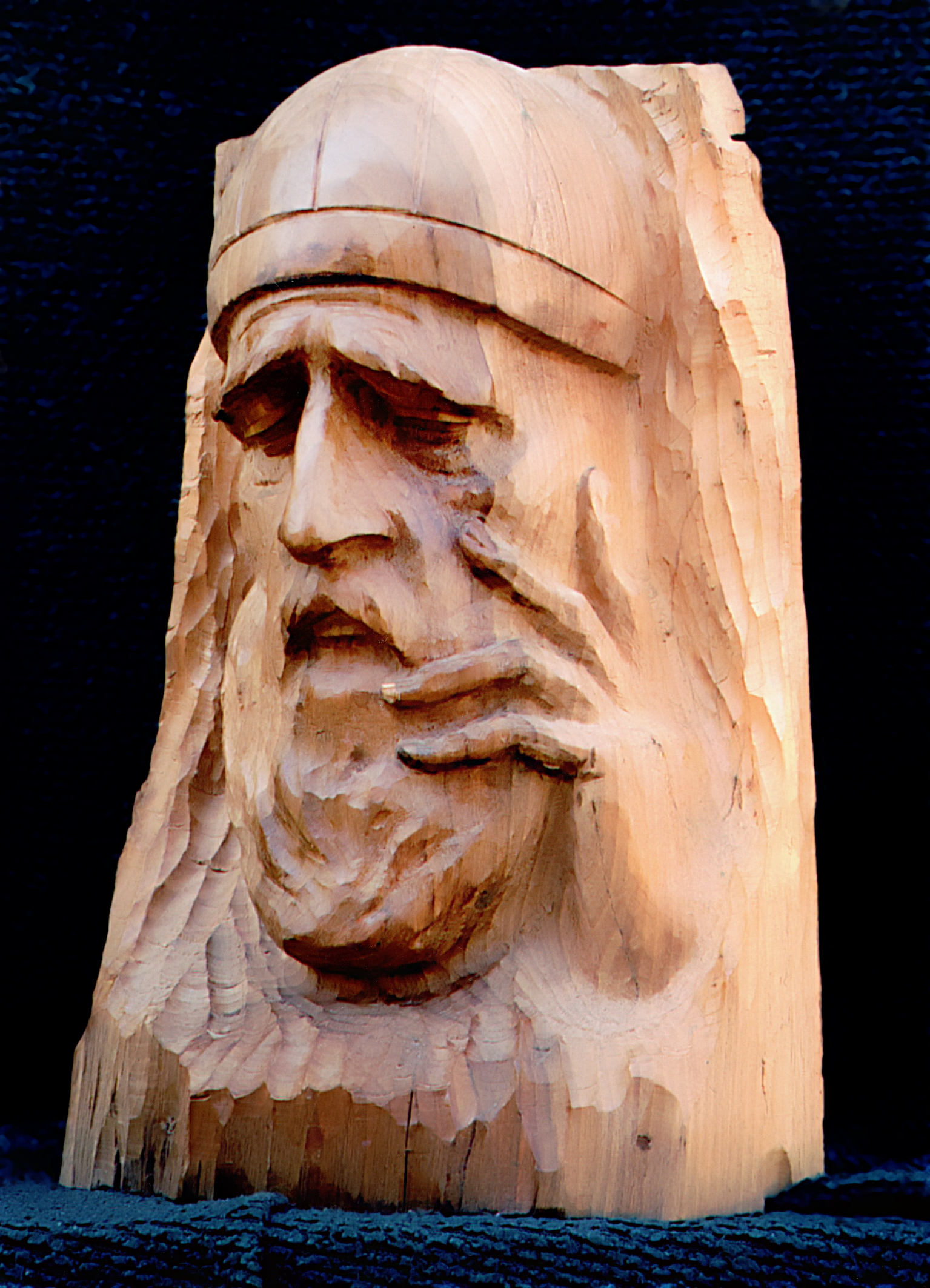
Fizuli

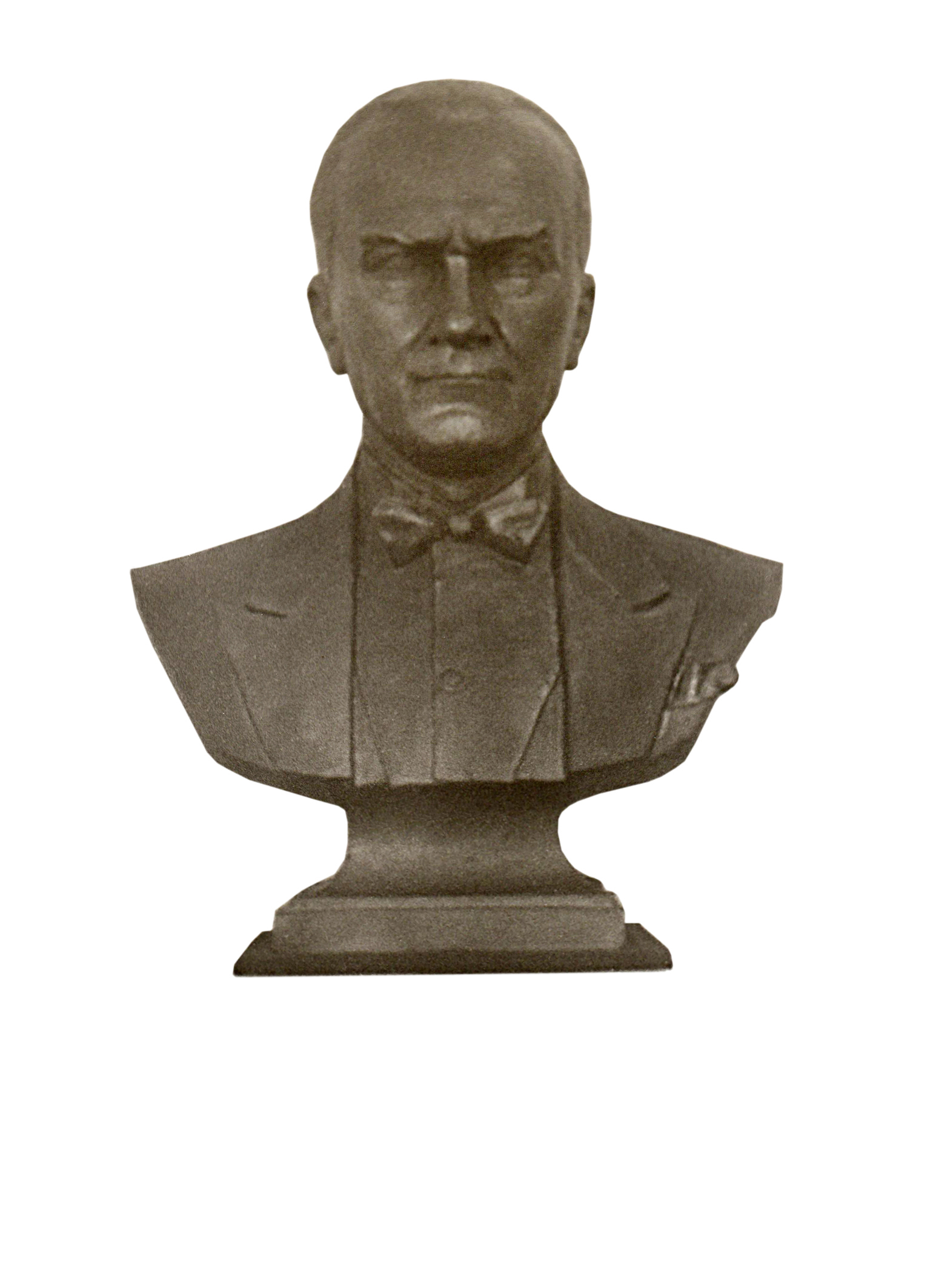
Ataturk

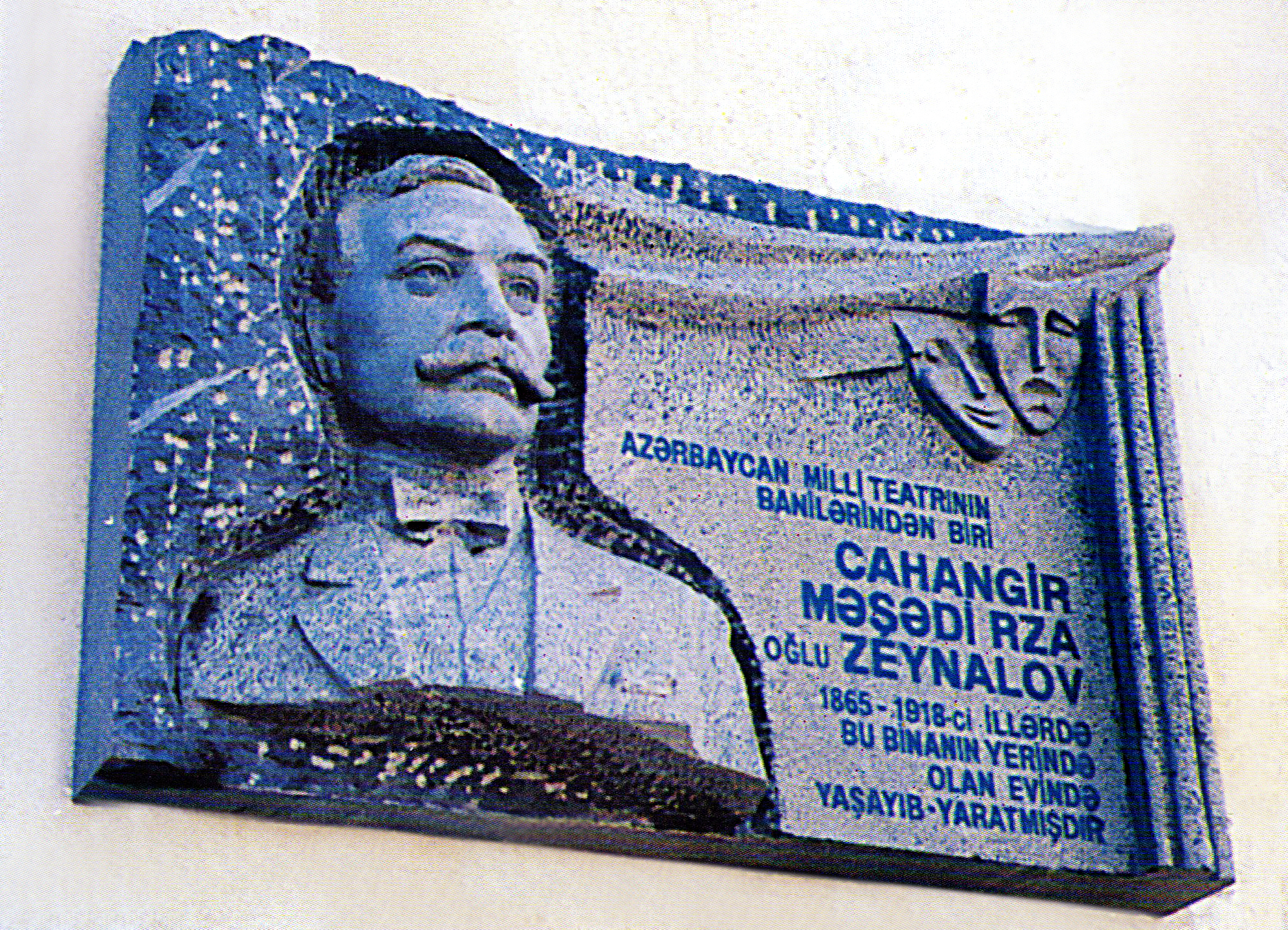
Jahangir Zeynalov

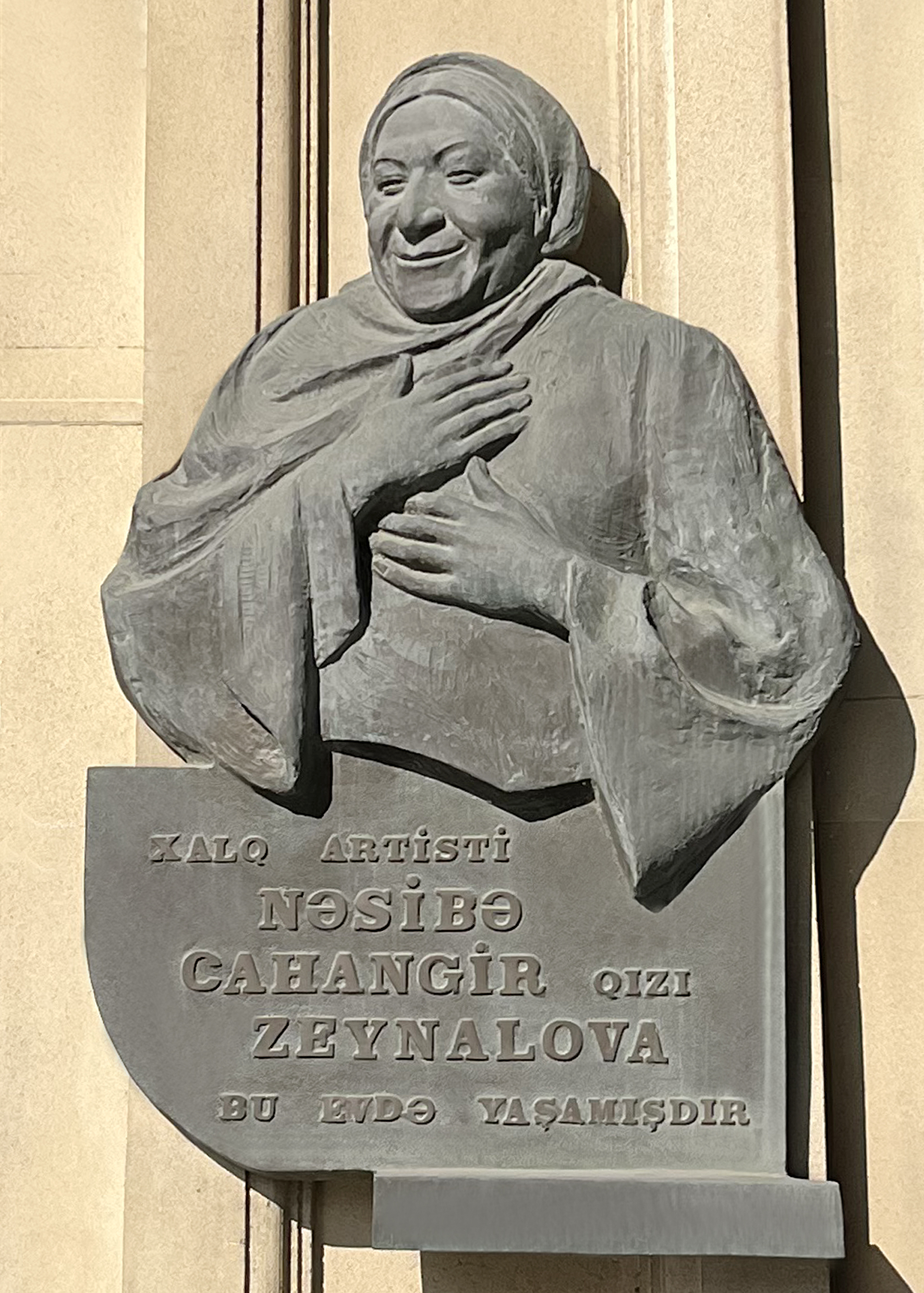
Nasiba Zeynalova

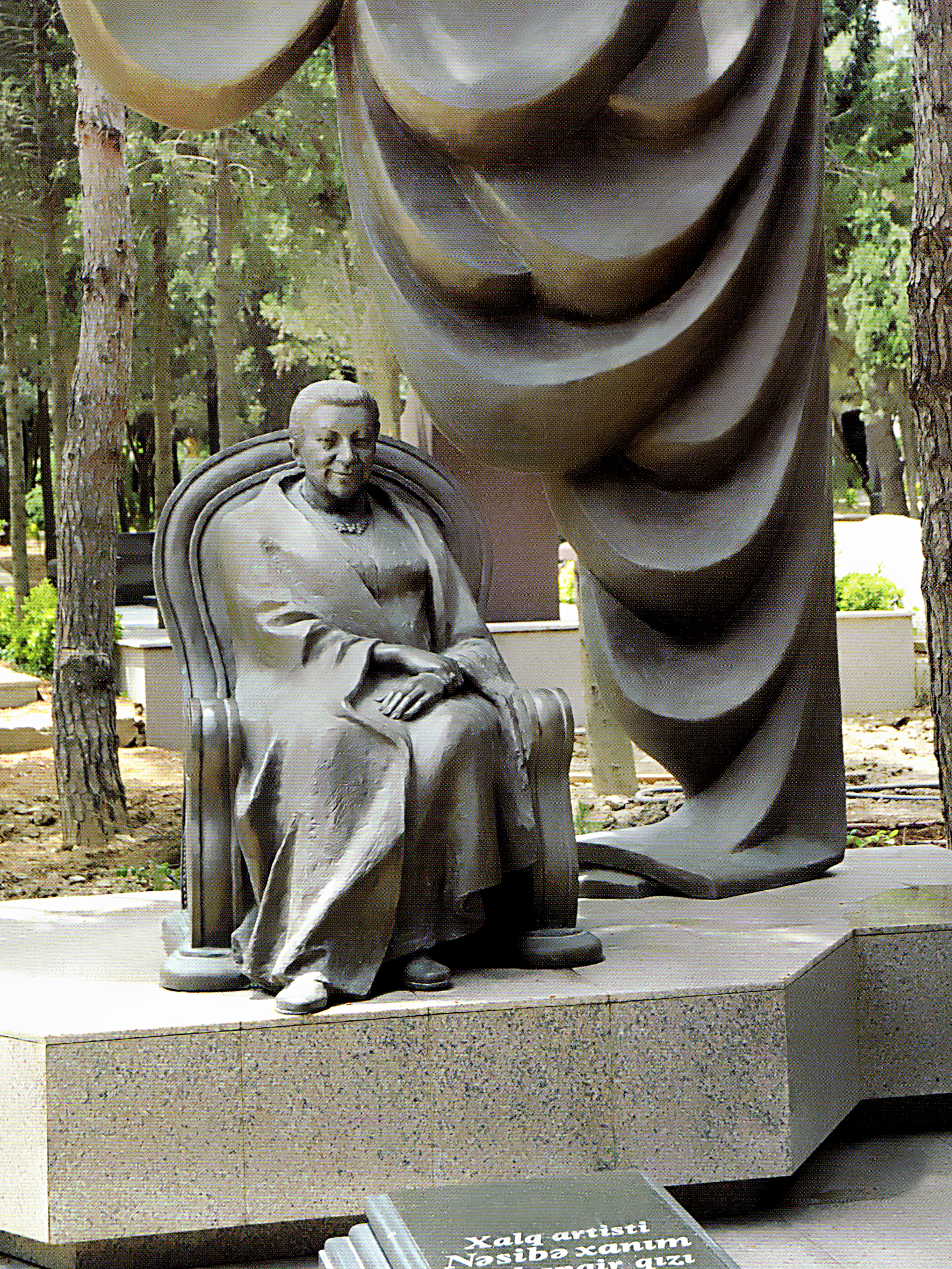
Nasiba Zeynalova

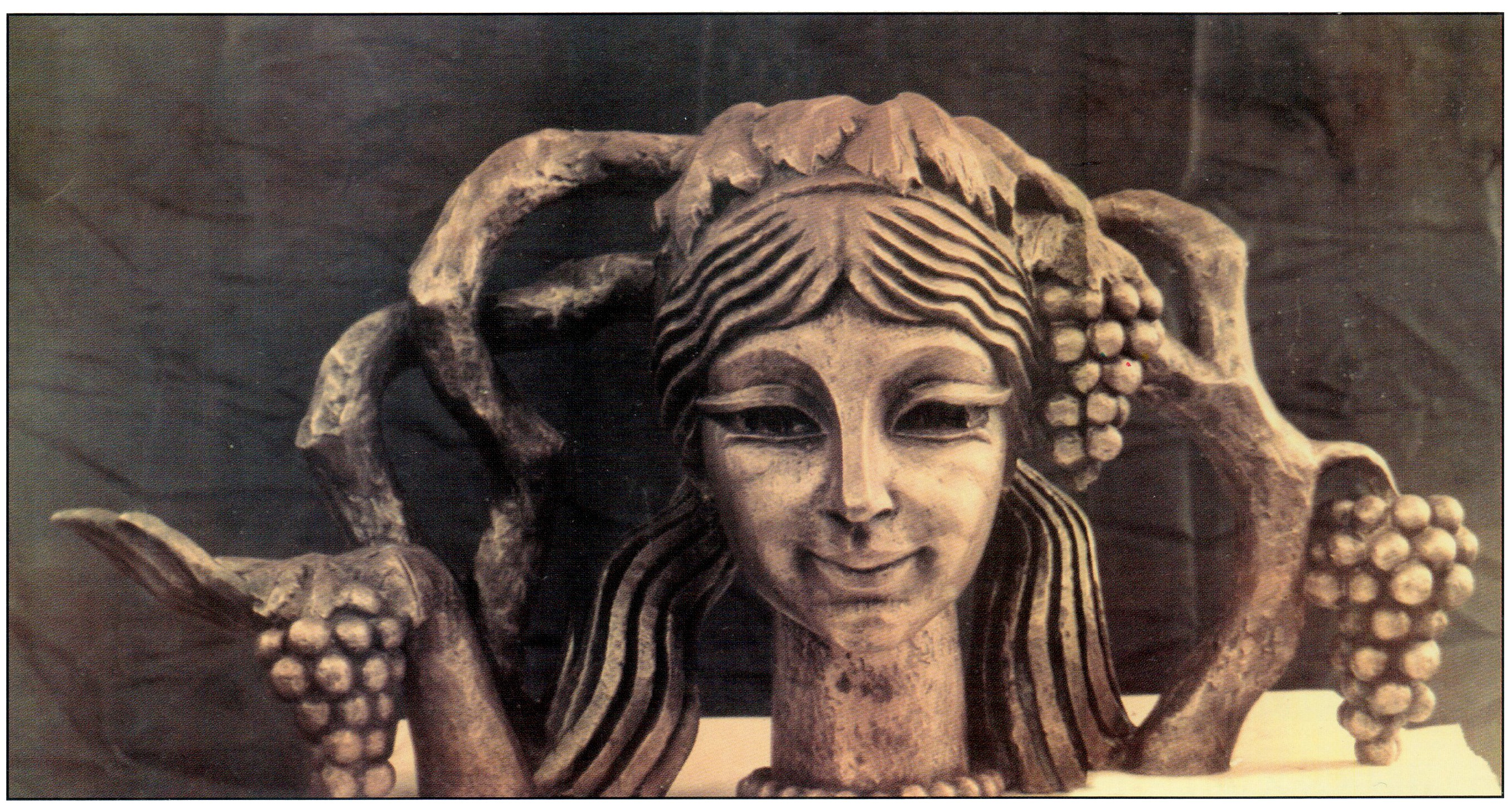
Autumn

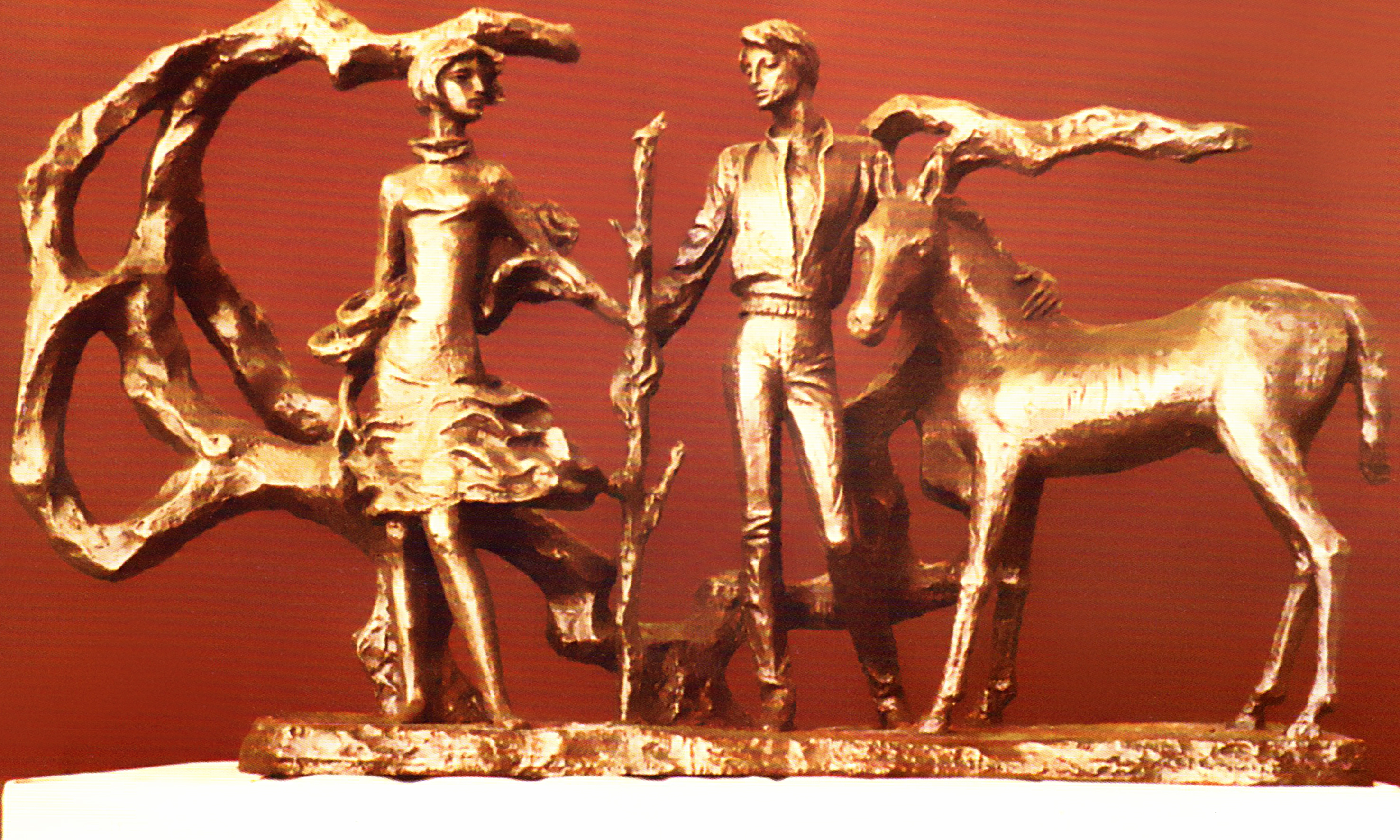
Saplings

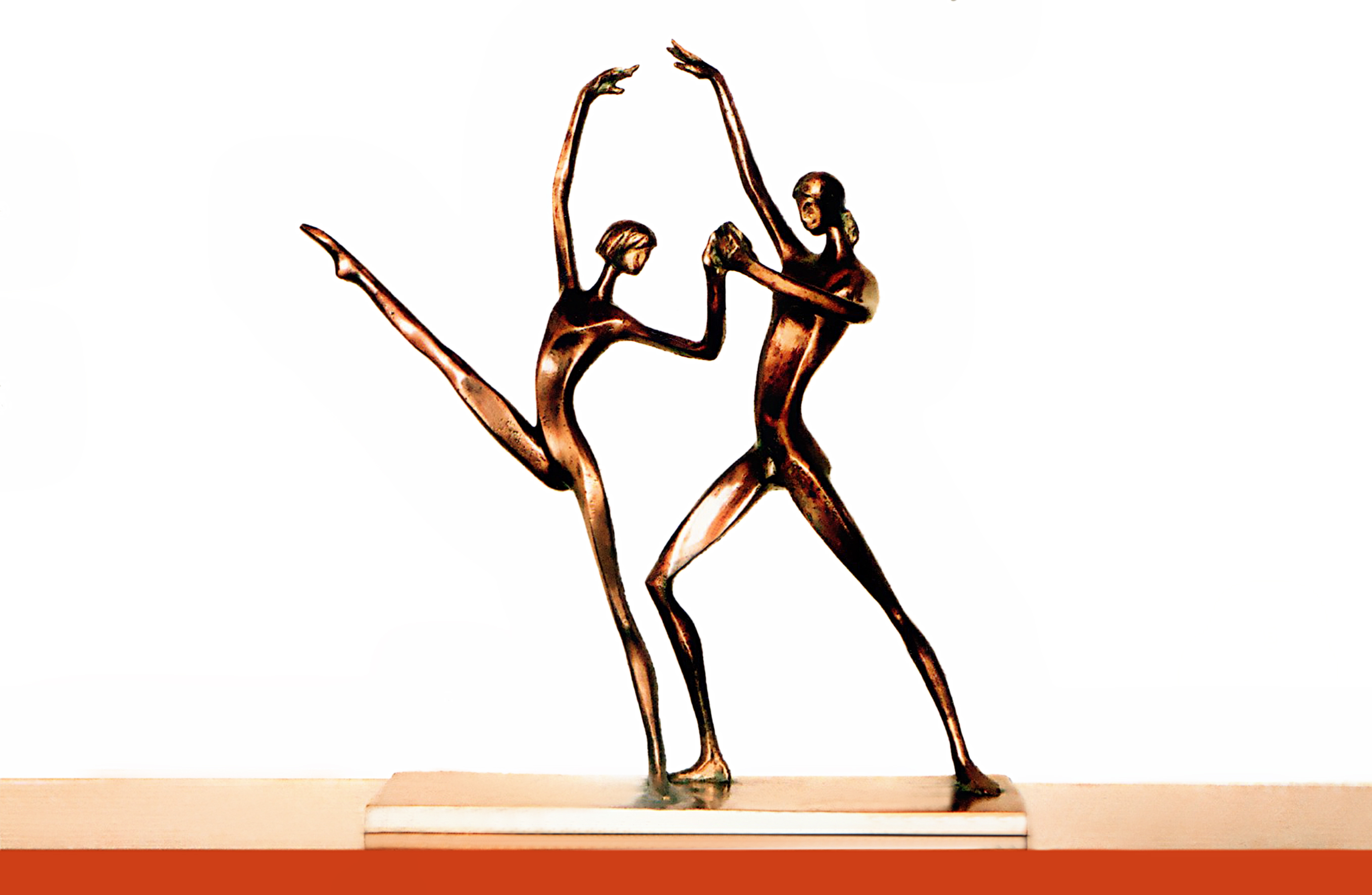
Balet

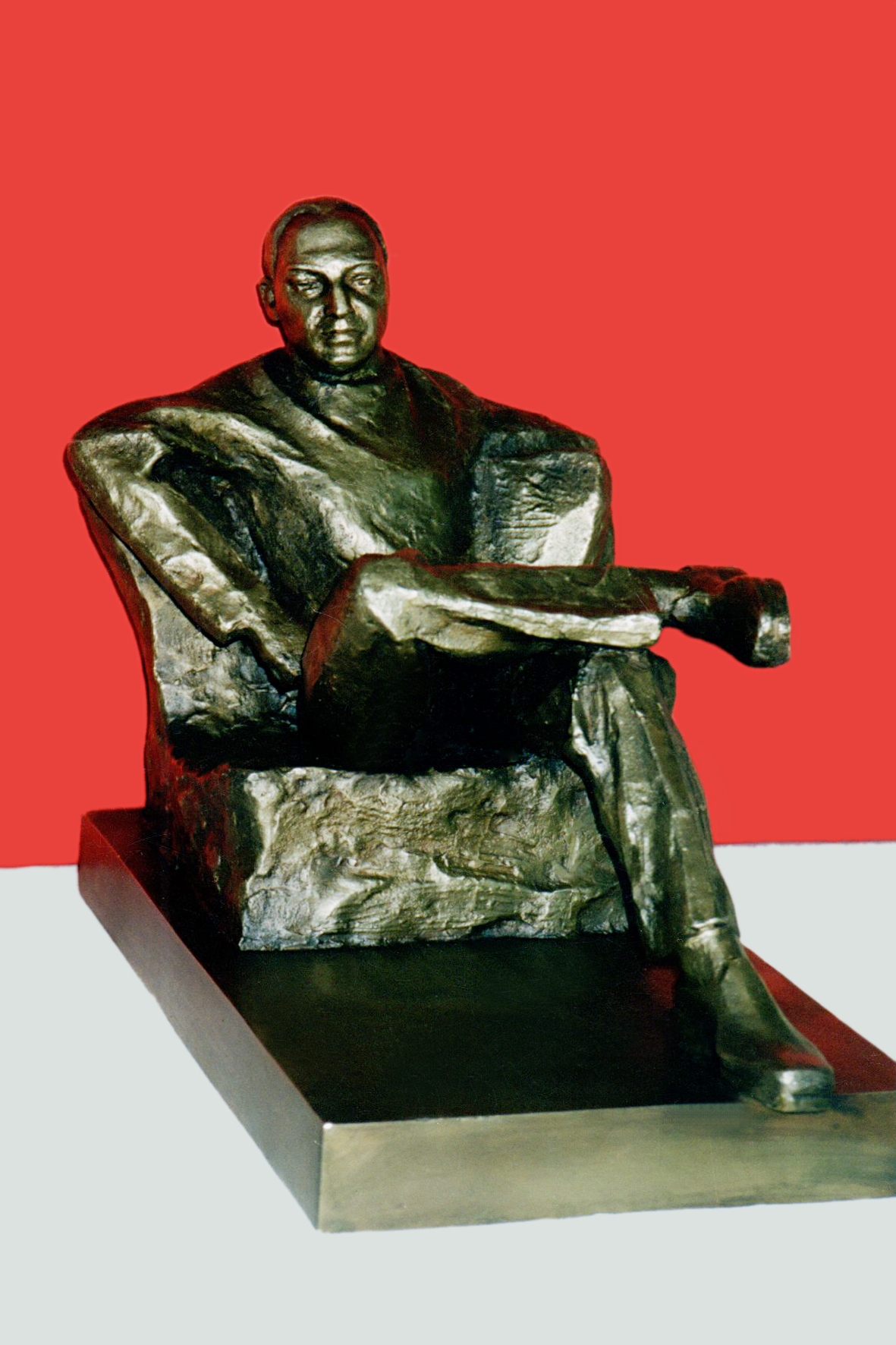
Figure of a Man

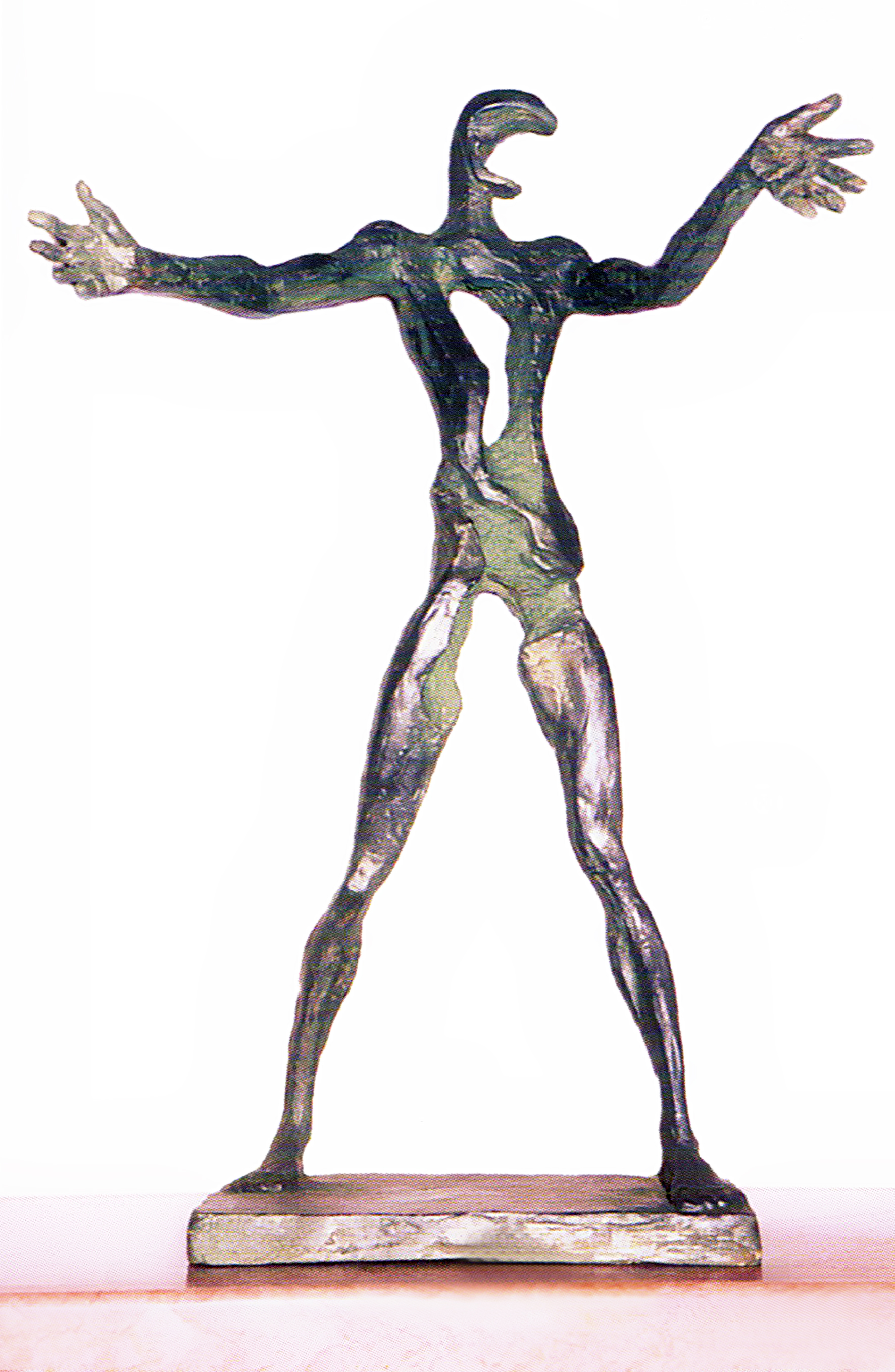
Appeal

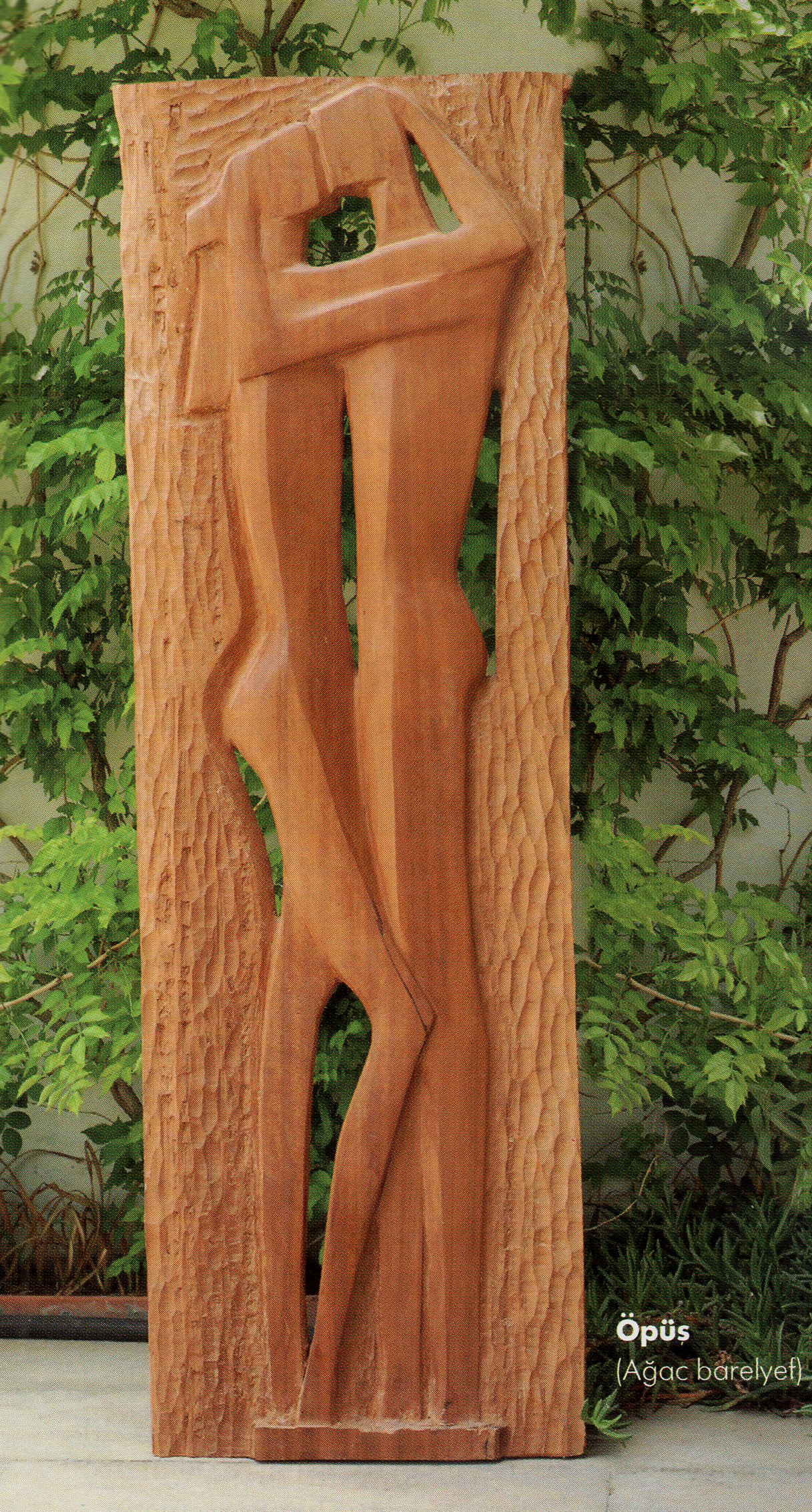
A Kiss

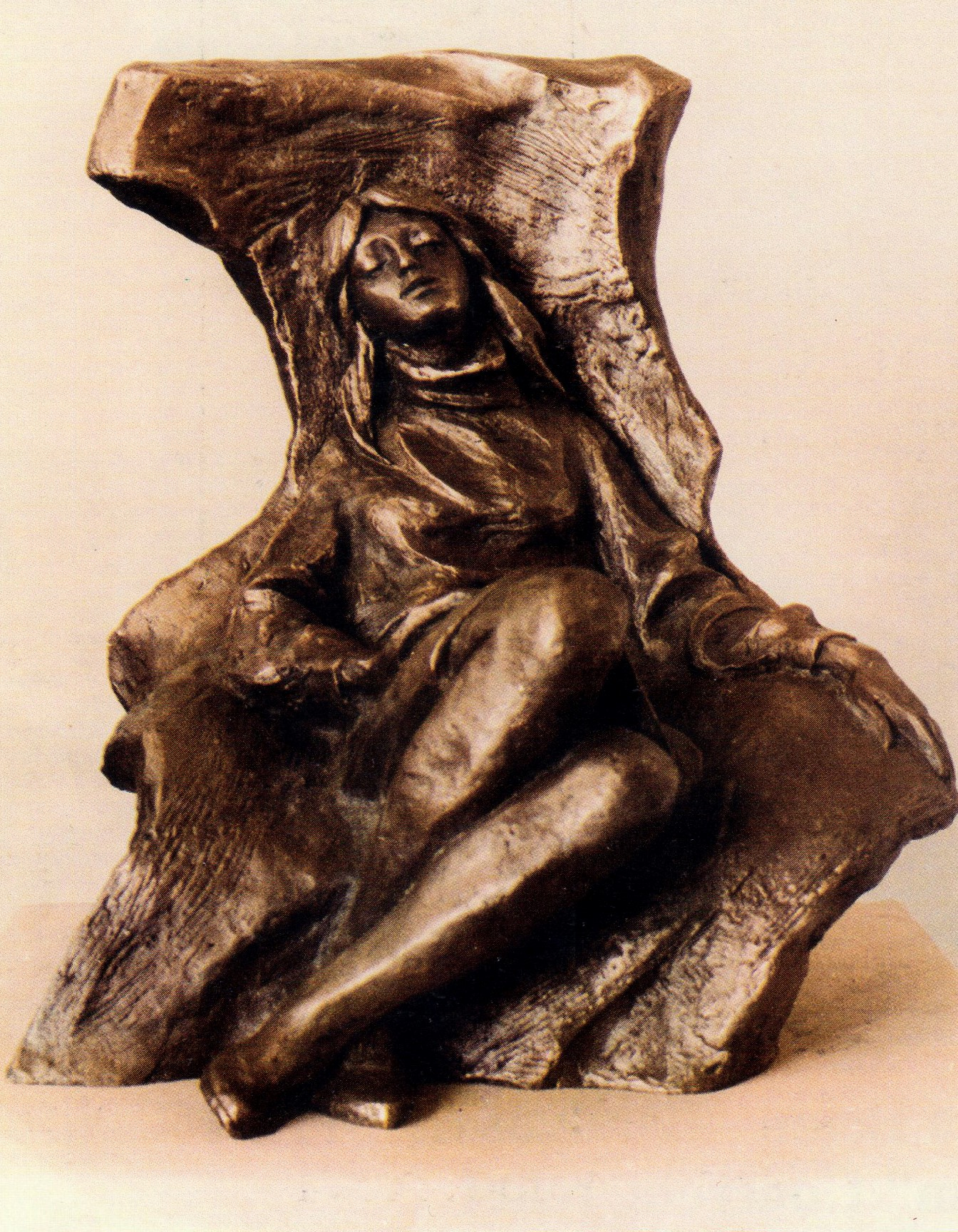
Music

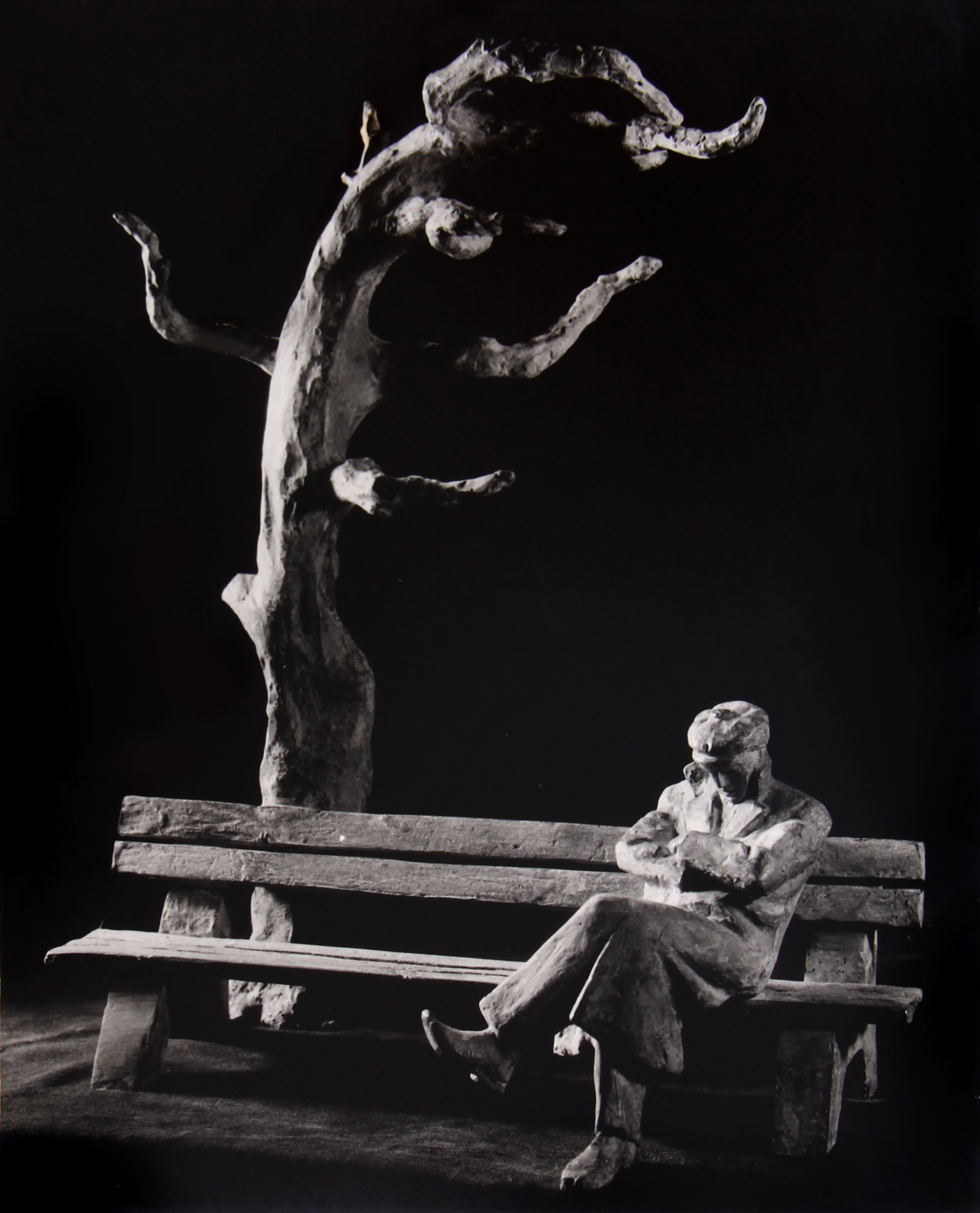
Reflections

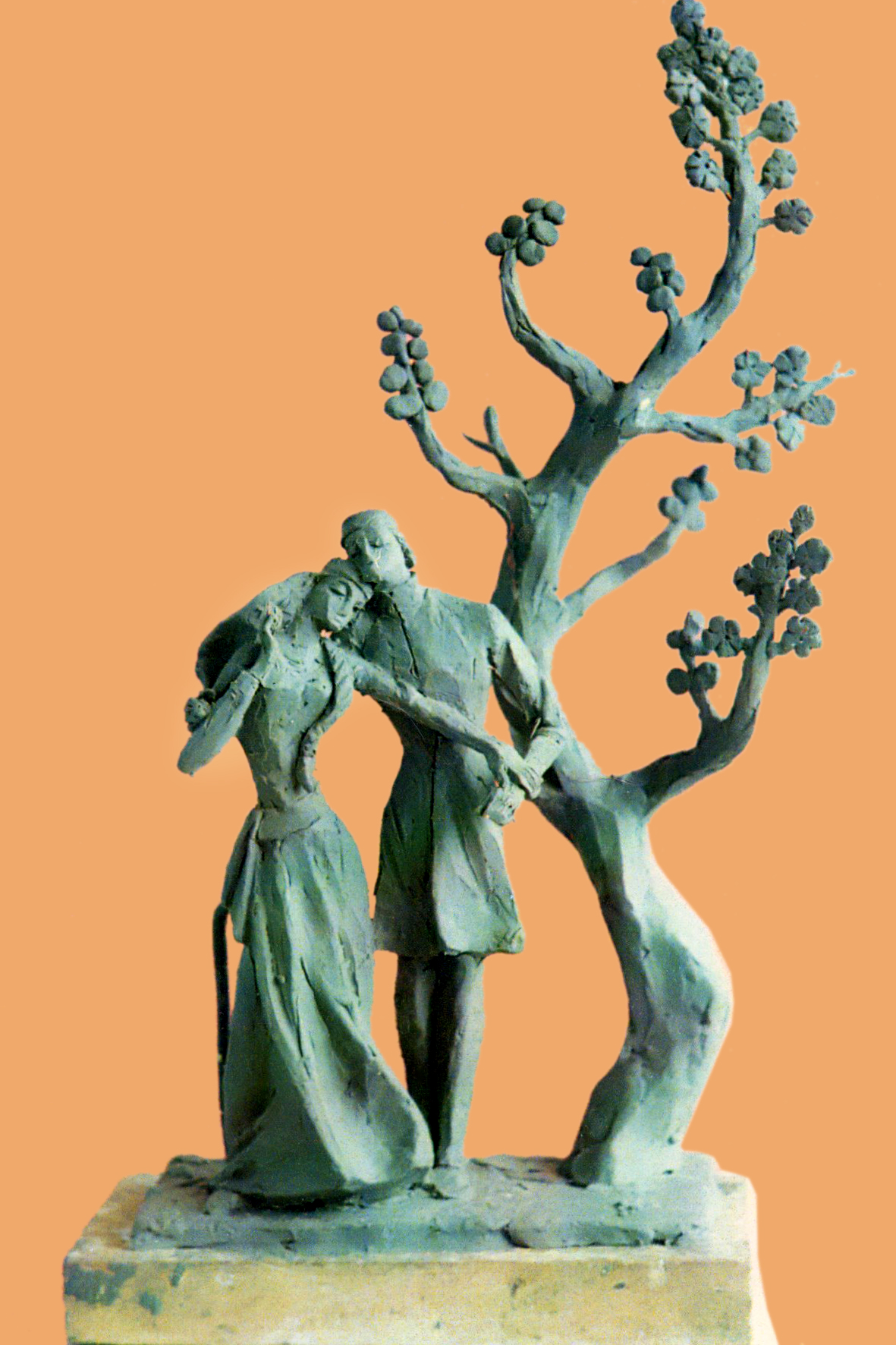
Eskiz of Ali & Nino

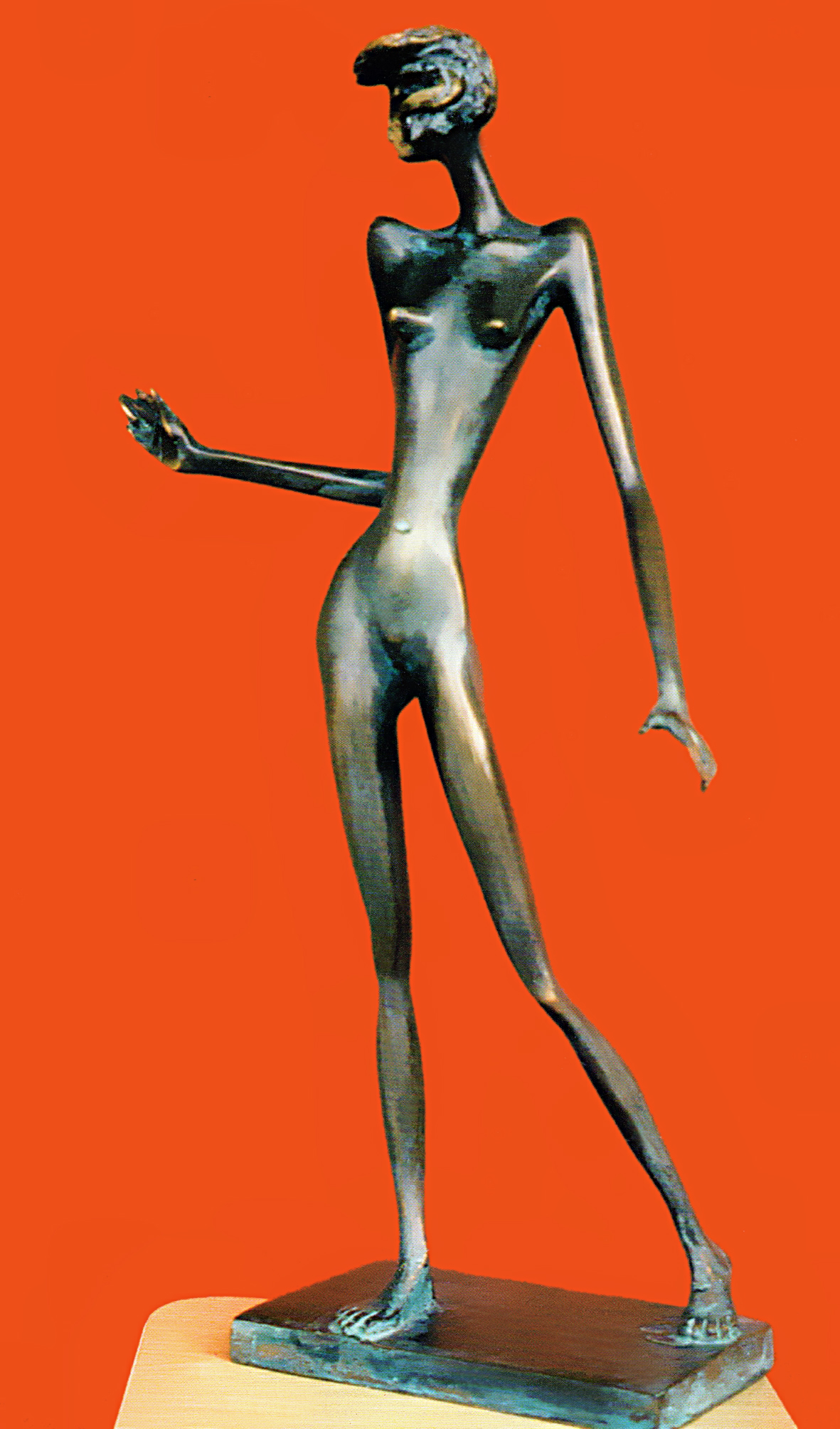
Figure of a Girl

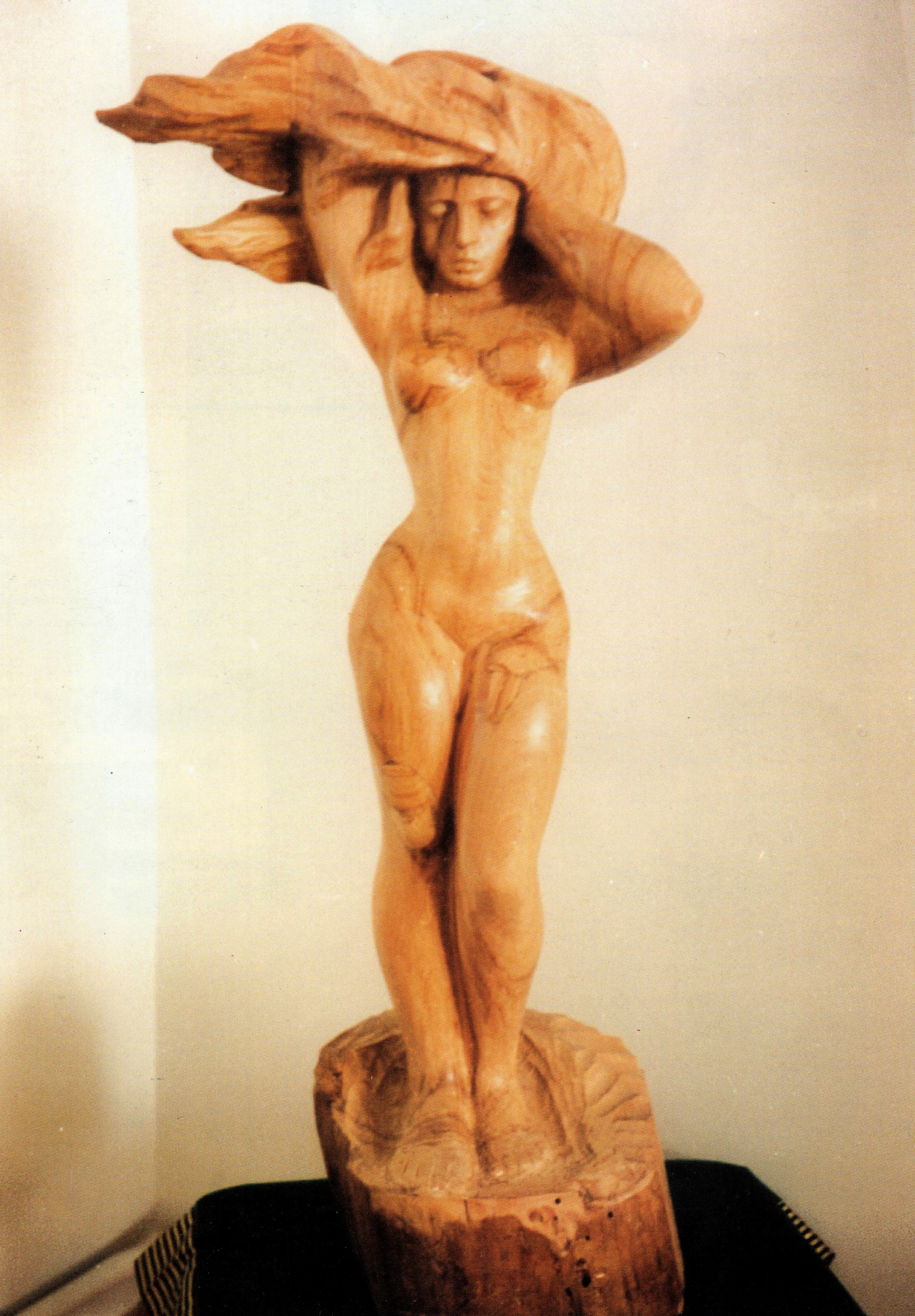
Figure of a Girl

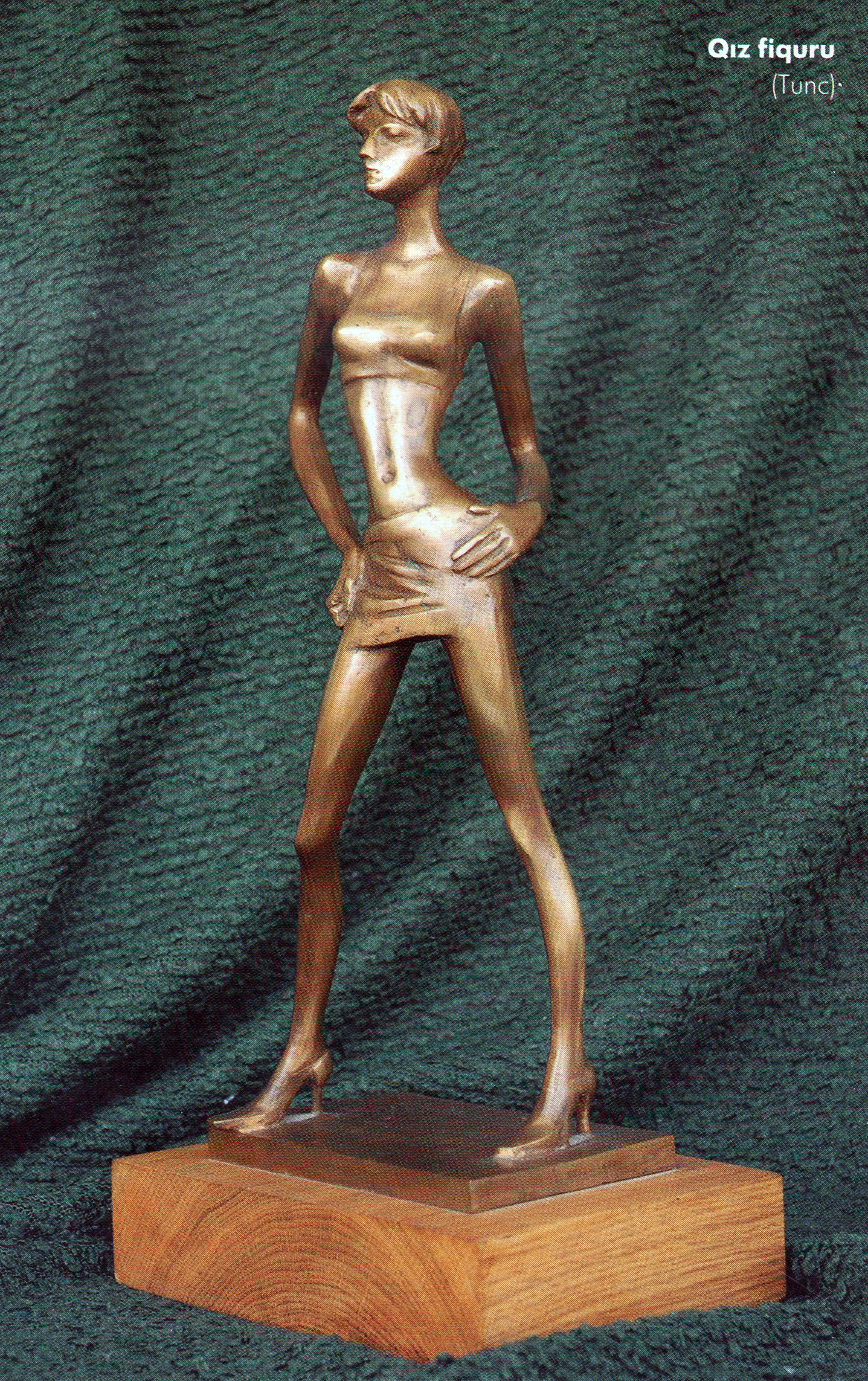
Figure of a Girl

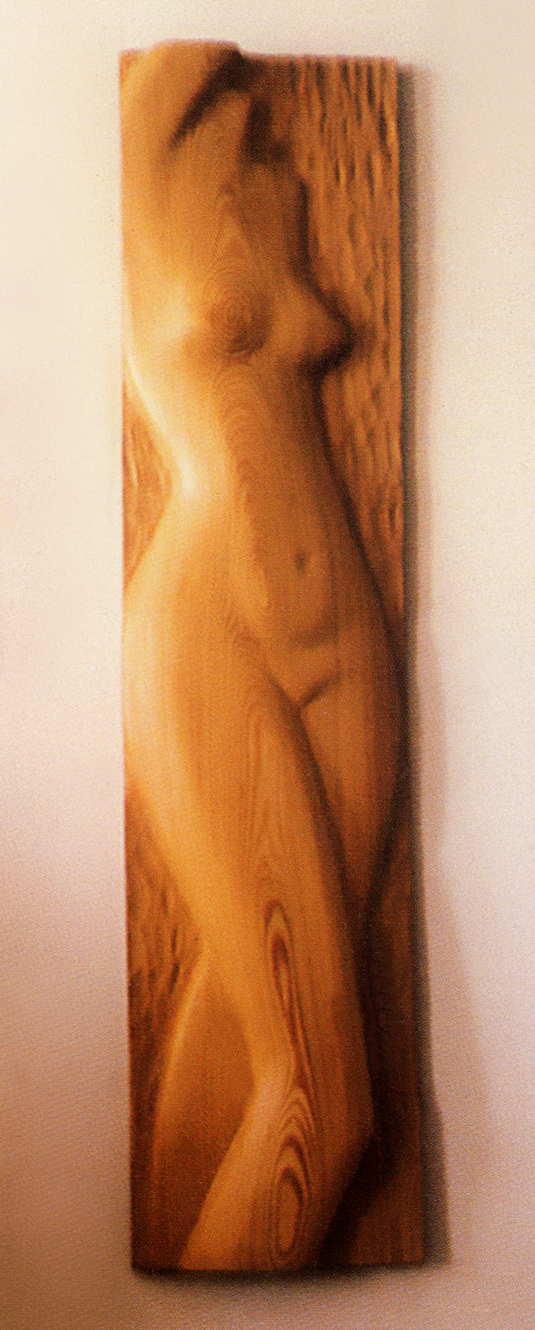
Figure of a Girl

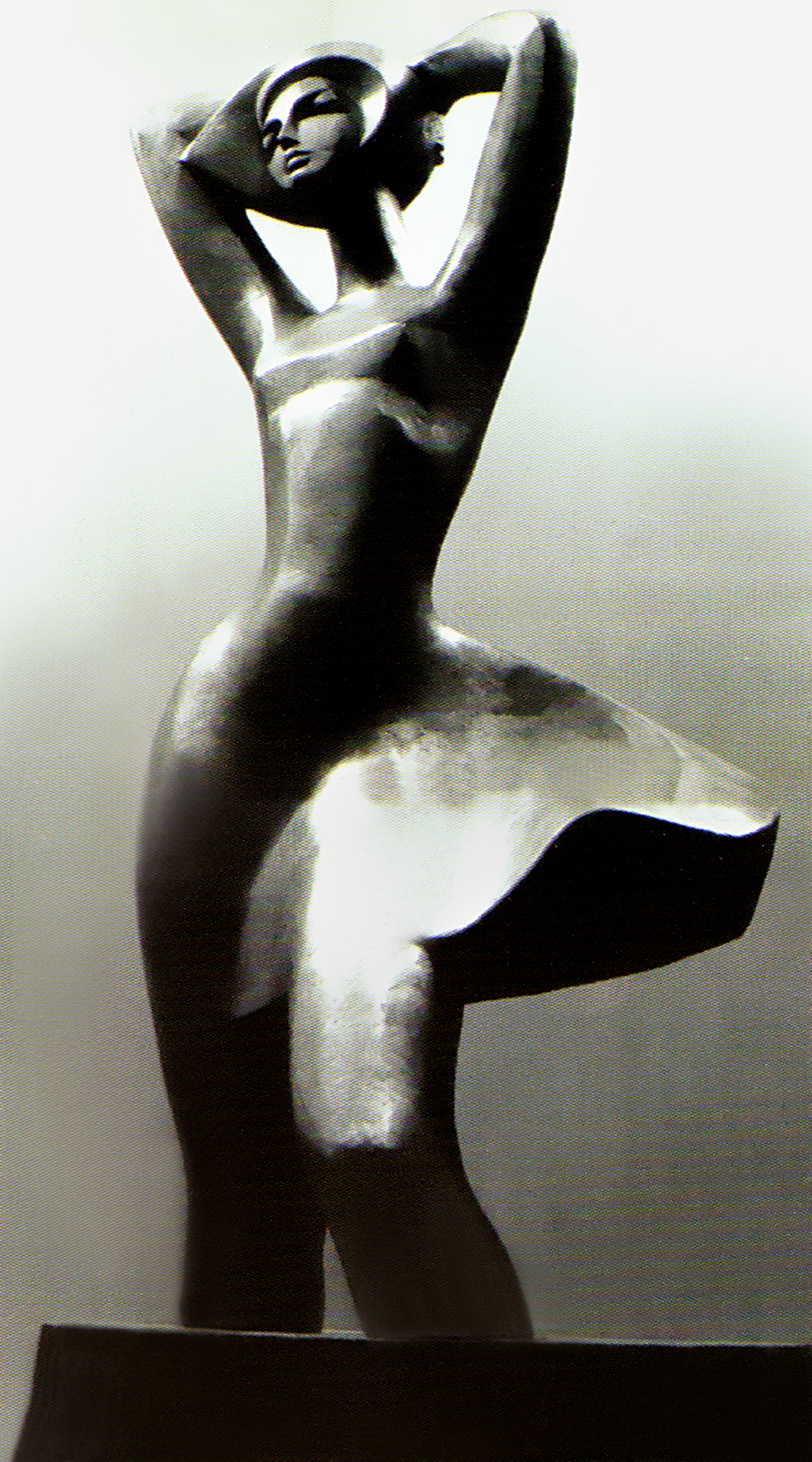
Figure of a Girl

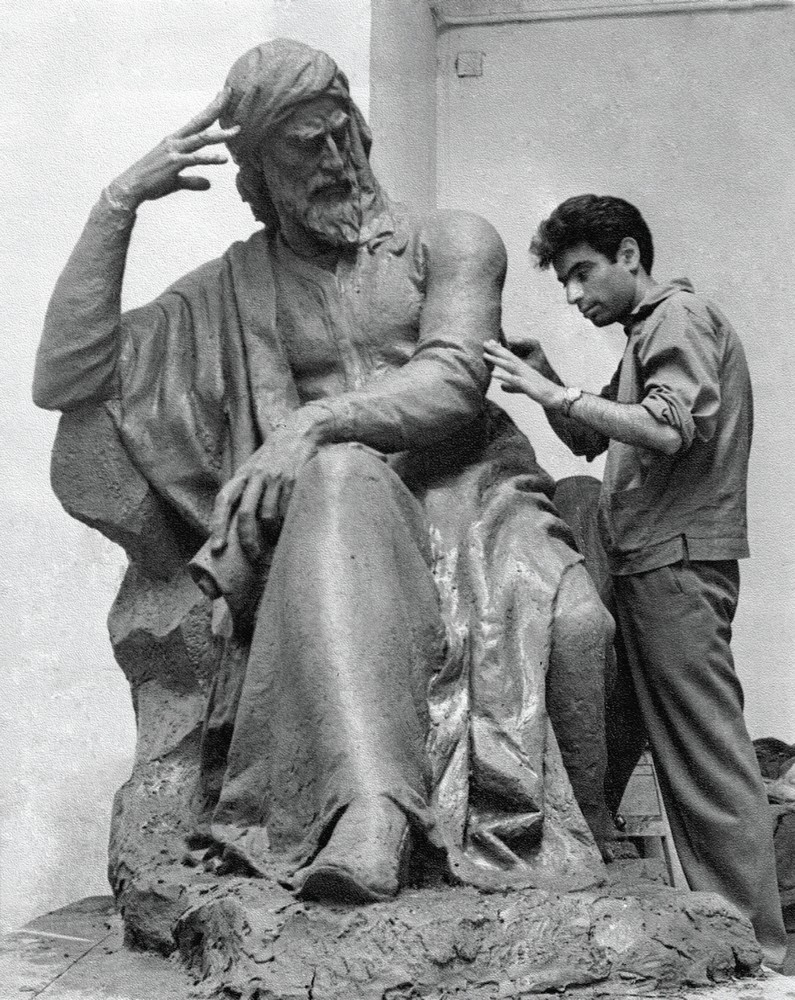
Graduate work _Xaqani
