= List of tombs and mausoleums =

See also Category:Monuments and memorials, cenotaph, monument, catacombs, cemetery, pyramid, list of Cemeteries, list of mausoleums, list of Memorials, list of pyramid mausoleums in North America.

This is a list of tombs and mausoleums that are either notable in themselves, or contain the remains of a notable person/people. Tombs are organized by the person buried in them, sorted according to origin of the person.

== Major figures in African history ==
=== Egyptian figures ===
| Person(s) | Significance | Location of Tomb | Article |
|---|---|---|---|
| Khufu | Fourth dynasty pharaoh, reigned 2589–2566 BCE | Great Pyramid in Giza, the only surviving wonder of the world | Great Pyramid |
| Tutankhamun | Eighteenth dynasty pharaoh of Egypt, reigned 1334–1325 BCE | Valley of the Kings; tomb famously excavated by Howard Carter | KV62 |

=== Songhai figures ===
| Person(s) | Significance | Location of Tomb | Article |
|---|---|---|---|
| Askia Mohammad I | Songhai Empire king and dyanastic founder, reigned 1493–1528 CE | Gao, Mali | Tomb of Askia |

=== Ugandan figures ===
| Person(s) | Significance | Location of Tomb | Article |
|---|---|---|---|
| Members of the Baganda royal family | Muteesa I (1835–1884), Mwanga II (1867–1903), Daudi Chwa II (1896–1939), and Sir Edward Muteesa II (1924–1969), Kabakas of Buganda | Kampala, Uganda | Kasubi Tombs |

== Major figures in Asian history ==
=== Chinese figures ===
| Person(s) | Significance | Location of Tomb | Article |
|---|---|---|---|
| Qin Shi Huang | Qin dynasty emperor from 221 to 210 BCE | Xi'an, Shaanxi, China | Mausoleum of the First Qin Emperor, including the Terracotta Army |
| Cao Cao | Eastern Han dynasty warlord and politician, lived 155–220 CE | Xigaoxue Village, Anfeng Township, Anyang County, Anyang, Henan, China | Cao Cao Mausoleum |
| Emperor Taizong of Tang | Tang dynasty emperor from 626 to 649 | Mount Jiuzong, Shaanxi, China | Zhao Mausoleum |
| Emperor Gaozong of Tang; Empress Wu Zetian; 17 others | Tang dynasty emperor from 649 to 683; Chinese sovereign ruler from 690 to 705 | Mount Liang, Qian County, Shaanxi, China | Qianling Mausoleum |
| Yongle Emperor and 12 succeeding emperors | Ming dynasty emperors from 1402 to 1644 | 13 km due north of Beijing, China | Ming tombs |
| Sun Yat-sen | Chinese revolutionary, founder of the Kuomintang, and 1st President of the Republic of China | At the foot of the second peak of the Purple Mountain, Nanjing, Jiangsu, China | Sun Yat-sen Mausoleum |
| Mao Zedong | Communist leader of China from 1943 to 1976 | Tiananmen Square, Beijing, China | Mausoleum of Mao Zedong |

=== Indian figures ===
| Person(s) | Significance | Location of Tomb | Article |
|---|---|---|---|
| Emperor Shah Jahan and Arjumand Banu Begum (Mumtaz Mahal) | Wife of Mughal Emperor Shahbuddin Mohammed Shah Jahan | Agra, India | Taj Mahal |
| Nasiruddin Humayun | 2nd Mughal Emperor, ruled in India from 1530 to 1540 and 1555–1556 | Delhi, India | Humayun's Tomb |
| Emperor Akbar and his wife Mariam-uz-Zamani | 3rd Mughal Emperor, ruled in India from 11th Feb,1556–27th Oct,1605 | Sikandra, Agra, India | Akbar's tomb, Mariam's Tomb |

=== Japanese figures ===
| Person(s) | Significance | Location of Tomb | Article |
|---|---|---|---|
| Nintoku | 16th emperor of Japan; world's largest mound tomb | Sakai, Osaka, Japan | Nintoku Mausoleum |

=== Korean figures ===
| Person(s) | Significance | Location of Tomb | Article |
|---|---|---|---|
| Dong Shou | See Anak Tomb No. 3 § Epitaph and its interpretation | Anak County, North Korea (Goguryeo) | Anak Tomb No. 3, Goguryeo tombs |
| Dangun | Founder and god-king of Gojoseon, the first Korean kingdom | Kangdong County, North Korea | Mausoleum of Tangun |
| Dae Heum-mu and 11 other family members | Royalty of the Balhae Kingdom | Yanbian Korean Autonomous Prefecture, Jilin, China | Ancient Tombs at Longtou Mountain, Mausoleum of Princess Zhenxiao |

=== Mongolian figures ===
| Person(s) | Significance | Location of Tomb | Article |
|---|---|---|---|
| Genghis Khan | Mongol military leader and founder of the Mongol Empire | Beside a river near Kandehuo Enclosure, Ejin Horo Banner, Inner Mongolia, China; Khan's body is not there (it has never been found) | Mausoleum of Genghis Khan and Burial place of Genghis Khan |
| Damdin Sükhbaatar | Revolutionary hero and founder of the modern Mongolian state | Sükhbaatar Square, Ulaanbaatar, Mongolia (removed in 2005, body cremated) | Sükhbaatar's mausoleum |
| Wang Zhaojun | Wife of a Xiongnu Chanyu (ruler) | Beside a river in Hohhot, Inner Mongolia, China | Zhaojun Tomb |

=== Myanmar figures ===
| Person(s) | Significance | Location of Tomb | Article |
|---|---|---|---|
| U Thant | The third Secretary-General of the United Nations | Yangon, Myanmar | Kandawmin Garden Mausolea |
| Aung San | Founder of Myanmar | Yangon, Myanmar | Martyrs' Mausoleum |

=== Pakistani figures ===
| Person(s) | Significance | Location of Tomb | Article |
|---|---|---|---|
| Muhammad Ali Jinnah | Founder of Pakistan | Karachi, Pakistan | Mausoleum of Muhammad Ali Jinnah |
| Muhammad Iqbal | Poet, Lawyer, Politician | Badshahi Mosque, Lahore, Pakistan | Tomb of Muhammad Iqbal |
| Maharaja Ranjit Singh | Sikh ruler | Lahore, Pakistan | Samadhi of Ranjit Singh |
| Baba Shah Jamal | Sufi saint | Lahore, Pakistan | Tomb of Shah Jamal |
| Qutb ud-Din Aibak | Founder of the Delhi Sultanate | Lahore, Pakistan | Anarkali Bazaar |

=== Vietnamese figures ===
| Person(s) | Significance | Location of Tomb | Article |
|---|---|---|---|
| Ho Chi Minh | Vietnamese Revolutionary Leader | Hanoi, Vietnam | Ho Chi Minh Mausoleum |

=== Other ===
| Person(s) | Significance | Location of Tomb | Article |
|---|---|---|---|
| (Timur) | Conqueror of much of western and central Asia, founder of the Timurid Empire and Timurid dynasty | Samarkand | Gur-e Amir |
| | | Sayyed Bahram Mausoleum | |

== Major figures in European history ==
=== Albanian figures ===
| Person(s) | Significance | Location of Tomb | Article |
|---|---|---|---|
| Enver Hoxha | First Secretary-General of the Party of Labour and premier of the Socialist People's Republic of Albania | Tirana, Albania | Enver Hoxha Mausoleum |
| King Zog | President, and later King, of interwar Albania | Tirana, Albania | Mausoleum of the Albanian Royal Family |

=== British figures ===
| Person(s) | Significance | Location of Tomb | Article |
|---|---|---|---|
| Sir Winston Leonard Spencer-Churchill | Soldier, author and Prime Minister of the United Kingdom | St Martin's Church, Bladon, near Woodstock, Oxfordshire | none |
| Edward Elgar | Musician and composer | St Wulstan's Roman Catholic Church, Little Malvern, Worcestershire | none |
| Queen Elizabeth II and Prince Philip | Long-reigning Queen of the United Kingdom and her husband | St George's Chapel in Windsor Castle, Berkshire | King George VI Memorial Chapel |
| Horatio Nelson, 1st Viscount Nelson | Admiral | St Paul's Cathedral, London | none |
| William Shakespeare | Author and playwright | Church of the Holy Trinity, Stratford-upon-Avon, Warwickshire | none |
| Queen Victoria and Prince Albert | Long-reigning Queen of the United Kingdom and her husband | Frogmore Mausoleum, on the private grounds of the Home Park, Windsor Castle, Berkshire | Frogmore |
| Arthur Wellesley, 1st Duke of Wellington | Soldier and Prime Minister of the United Kingdom | St Paul's Cathedral, London | none |

=== Bulgarian and Ancient Thracian figures ===
| Person(s) | Significance | Location of Tomb | Article |
|---|---|---|---|
| Seuthes III (first half of the 4th century BC) | Thracian king of the Odrysian kingdom (securely attested between 324 and 312 BC) | Shipka (town), Kazanlak, Stara Zagora Province, Bulgaria | Tomb of Seuthes III built in the second half of the 5th century BC, previously to the burial. |
| unknown (4th century BC) | Thracian king, probably of the Odrysian kingdom | Kazanlak, Bulgaria | Thracian Tomb of Kazanlak |
| Dromichaetes (c. 300 – c. 280 BC) | Thracian king of the Getae | Sveshtari, Razgrad Province, Bulgaria | Thracian Tomb of Sveshtari |
| Kubrat (c. 632 – c. 650/665?) | Kubrat was the founder and ruler of Old Great Bulgaria. | Village of Mala Pereshchepina (20 km from Poltava, Ukraine) | Pereshchepina Tomb |
| Kaloyan (c. 1170 – October 1207) | Tsar of Bulgaria from 1196 to 1207, younger brother of Theodor and Asen who led the anti-Byzantine uprising of the Bulgarians in 1185. | Veliko Tarnovo, Bulgaria | Holy Forty Martyrs Church (1230) |
| Hreljo (13th century – 1342) | 14th-century semi-independent feudal lord in the region of northeastern Macedonia and the Rila mountains. | Rila Monastery, Blagoevgrad Province, Bulgaria | Rila Monastery |
| Neofit Rilski (1793–1881) | 19th-century Bulgarian monk, teacher and artist, and an important figure of the Bulgarian National Revival. | Rila Monastery, Blagoevgrad Province, Bulgaria | Rila Monastery |
| Alexander I (1857–1893) | First prince (knyaz) of the Principality of Bulgaria from 1879 until his abdication in 1886 | Sofia, Bulgaria | Battenberg Mausoleum |
| Georgi Dimitrov (1882–1949) | The first communist leader of Bulgaria from 1946 to 1949 who led the Communist International from 1935 to 1943. | Sofia, Bulgaria | Georgi Dimitrov Mausoleum |

=== French figures ===
| Person(s) | Significance | Location of Tomb | Article |
|---|---|---|---|
| Napoleon I and family members | Corsican soldier and French emperor | Massive multi-layered sarcophagus under the dome of Les Invalides, Paris, France | Les Invalides |
| Marie Curie and Pierre Curie | French–Polish couple who discovered X-rays; Marie won the Nobel Prize twice | The Panthéon in Paris, France | Panthéon, Paris |
| Alexandre Dumas, père | Author | The Panthéon in Paris, France | Panthéon, Paris |
| Ferdinand Foch | Marshal of France during World War I | Les Invalides, Paris, France | Les Invalides |
| Victor Hugo | Author | The Panthéon in Paris, France | Panthéon, Paris |
| Joseph Louis Lagrange | Italian–French mathematician and astronomer | The Panthéon in Paris, France | Panthéon, Paris |
| Claude Joseph Rouget de Lisle | French Army captain and author of Le Marseillaise, the national anthem | Les Invalides, Paris, France | Les Invalides |
| Gaspard Monge | French mathematician and inventor of descriptive geometry | Le Père Lachaise Cemetery, Paris, France (since moved to the Panthéon) | Gaspard Monge's mausoleum |
| Henri de la Tour d'Auvergne | Viscount of Turenne and Marshal of France under Louis XIV; one of France's greatest military leaders | Les Invalides, Paris, France | Les Invalides |
| Sébastien Le Prestre de Vauban (Vauban) | Military architect for Louis XIV | Les Invalides, Paris, France | Les Invalides |
| Francois-Marie Arouet (Voltaire) | French philosopher of The Enlightenment | The Panthéon in Paris, France | Panthéon, Paris |

=== German figures ===
| Person(s) | Significance | Location of Tomb | Article |
|---|---|---|---|
| Ludwig van Beethoven | Musician and composer | Vienna Central Cemetery, Vienna, Austria | |
| Otto von Bismarck | First Chancellor of Germany | Bismarck Mausoleum near Friedrichsruhe, Schleswig-Holstein, Germany | Bismarck Mausoleum |
| Johann Wolfgang von Goethe | Author and playwright | Historical Cemetery, Weimar, Thuringia, Germany | |
| William I | German Emperor from 1871 to 1888 | Charlottenburg Palace, Berlin, Germany | |
| Karl Marx (and his wife and other members of Marx's family) | Economist and philosopher | The Eastern cemetery of Highgate Cemetery, North London, England. | Tomb of Karl Marx |

=== Greek and Macedonian figures ===
| Person(s) | Significance | Location of Tomb | Article |
|---|---|---|---|
| Alexander the Great | King of Macedon, conqueror of the Persian Empire | Tomb lost; ancient sources mention Memphis and Alexandria, both in Egypt | Tomb of Alexander the Great |

=== Italian figures ===
| Person(s) | Significance | Location of Tomb | Article |
|---|---|---|---|
| Caesar Augustus and other emperors of his family | First Roman emperor 27 BC – 14 AD | Campus Martius (now the Piazza Augusto Imperatore) in Rome, Italy (ashes now scattered) | Mausoleum of Augustus |
| Gaius Julius Caesar | Roman general and dictator assassinated 44 BC | Forum Romanum in Rome, Italy | Roman Forum |
| Gaius Galerius Valerius Maximianus (Galerius) | Roman Emperor from 305 to 311 AD | Thessaloniki, Greece | Arch and Tomb of Galerius |
| Hadrian and family members | Roman emperor from 117 to 138 AD | Rome, Italy (now the Castel Sant'Angelo; ashes now scattered) | Castel Sant'Angelo |
| Theodoric the Great | 5th–6th century Ostrogothic king, ruler of Italy, and regent of the Visigoths | Just outside Ravenna, Italy | Mausoleum of Theodoric |

=== Russian figures ===
| Person(s) | Significance | Location of Tomb | Article |
|---|---|---|---|
| Vladimir Ilyich Lenin | Russian communist revolutionary and 1st Premier of the Soviet Union | Red Square, Moscow, Russia | Lenin's Mausoleum |
| Josef Vissarionovich Stalin | Soviet dictator from 1920s–1953 | Formerly in Lenin's Mausoleum; reburied outside the Kremlin, Moscow, Russia | Kremlin Wall Necropolis |

== Major figures in Middle-Eastern history ==
=== Persian/Iranian figures ===
| Person(s) | Significance | Location of Tomb | Article |
|---|---|---|---|
| Cyrus the Great | the founder of the Persian Empire under the Achaemenid dynasty | Pasargadae near the city of Shiraz, Iran | Tomb of Cyrus the Great |
| Darius I, Xerxes I, Artaxerxes I, Darius II and Darius III | emperors of the Achaemenid dynasty | Naqsh-e Rustam near the city of Shiraz, Iran | Naqsh-e Rustam |
| Artaxerxes II and Artaxerxes III | emperors of the Achaemenid dynasty | Persepolis near the city of Shiraz, Iran | Persepolis |
| Mausolus | Persian satrap of Caria | Halicarnassus (present Bodrum, Turkey); the origin of the word "mausoleum" – the tomb is now destroyed | Mausoleum of Maussollos |
| Abu Lu'lu'a Firuz (d. 644) | assassin of the second Islamic caliph Umar | Kashan, Iran | Shrine of Abu Lu'lu'a |
| Yaqub Leith Saffari (840–879) | ruler of the Saffarid dynasty | Shahabad (ancient Gondishapur) near Dezful, Iran | none |
| Amir Esmail Samani (d. 907) | ruler of the Samanid dynasty | Bukhara, Uzbekistan | Samanid Mausoleum |
| Qabus ebn Voshmgir (d. 1012) | ruler of the Ziyarid dynasty | Gonbad, Iran | none |
| Toghril Beg (990–1063) | ruler of the Seljuk dynasty | Rey, Iran | Tughrul Tower |
| Malekshah (d. 1092) | ruler of the Seljuk dynasty | Isfahan, Iran | none |
| Khwajeh Nezam ol-Molk (1018–1092) | vizier of Malekshah | Isfahan, Iran | none |
| Shah Shoja' (d. 1384) | ruler of the Mozaffarid dynasty and patron of Hafez | Shiraz, Iran | none |
| Gawhar Shad (d. 1457) | wife of Shah Rukh of the Timurid dynasty and founder of Gowhar Shad Mosque | Herat, Afghanistan | Gawhar Shad Mausoleum |
| Nader Shah (1688–1747) | Shah of Iran and the founder of the Afsharid dynasty | Mashhad, Iran | none |
| Karim Khan (1705–1779) | the ruler and de facto Shah of Iran of the Zand dynasty | Shiraz, Iran | Pars Museum of Shiraz |
| Naser ed-Din Shah (1831–1896) and Sattar Khan (1868–1914) | shah of Iran the Qajar dynasty that assassinated in the same shrine on May 1, 1896, and Persian freedom fighter of Constitutional Revolution | Rey, Iran | Shah-Abdol-Azim shrine |
| Reza Shah (1878–1944) | Shah of Iran of the Pahlavi dynasty | Rey, Iran demolished in 1979 after the Iranian Revolution | Reza Shah's mausoleum |
| Ruhollah Khomeini | Founder of the Islamic Republic of Iran and the leader of the 1979 Iranian Revolution | South of Tehran, Iran, near Behesht-e Zahra Cemetery | Mausoleum of Ruhollah Khomeini |
| Bayazid Bastami (804–874) | Persian mystic | Bastam, Iran | none |
| Sheikh Abulhassan Kharaqani (963–1033) | Persian mystic | Kharaqan near Bastam, Iran | none |
| Ali Hujwiri (990–1077) | Persian mystic | Lahore, Pakistan | Data Durbar Complex |
| Khwajeh Abdollah Ansari (1006–1088) | Persian mystic | Herat, Afghanistan | Khwaja 'Abd Allah Ansari shrine |
| Sheikh Ahmad Jami (1048–1141) | Persian mystic | Torbat-e Jam, Iran | none |
| Abdol-Qader Gilani (1077–1166) | Persian mystic and founder of the Qaderi Sufi Order | Baghdad, Iraq | none |
| Qotbeddin Heydar (1137–1221) | Persian mystic | Torbat-e Heydarieh, Iran | none |
| Moinoddin Chishti (1141–1230) | Persian mystic and founder of Chishti Order | Ajmer, India | none |
| Sheikh Abdolsamad Esfahani (13th century) | Persian mystic | Natanz, Iran | none |
| Sheikh Mohammad Bakran (d. 1303) | Persian mystic | near Isfahan, Iran | Pir-i Bakran |
| Amu Abdollah (d. 1316) | Persian mystic | near Isfahan, Iran | Manar Jonban |
| Sheikh Zahed Gilani (1216–1301) | Persian mystic and Murshid of Sheikh Safieddin Ardabili | Lahijan, Iran | none |
| Sheikh Safieddin Ardabili (1252–1334) | Persian mystic and eponym of the Safavid dynasty | Ardabil, Iran – Ismail I the founder of the Safavid dynasty is also buried there | none |
| Khwajeh Zeinoddin Shirazi (1302–1370) | Persian mystic | Khuldabad, India | none |
| Baha ed-Din Naqshband Bukhari (1318–1389) | Persian mystic and founder of Naqshbandi Order | Bukhara, Uzbekistan | none |
| Shah Nimatullah Vali (1330–1431) | Persian mystic and founder of the Nematollahi Sufi Order | Mahan, Iran, Iran | Shah Nematollah Vali Shrine |
| Sibaveih (760–797) | Persian linguist | Shiraz, Iran | none |
| Imam Bukhari (810–870) | Persian Sunni scholar | near Samarkand, Uzbekistan | none |
| Ebn-e Babveih (d. 941) | Persian Shi'ite scholar | Rey, Iran | Ebn-e Babveih |
| Rabe'eh Balkhi (10th century) | Persian poet | Balkh, Afghanistan | none |
| Ferdowsi (940–1020) | Persian poet | Tus, Iran | none |
| Avicenna (980–1037) | Persian philosopher and physician | Hamedan, Iran | none |
| Baba Taher (11th century) | Persian mystic and poet | Hamedan, Iran | none |
| Asadi Tusi (d. 1072), Anvari (1126–1189), Homam Tabrizi (1238–1315), Khaqani (1121–1190), Qatran Tabrizi (1009–1072) and Shahriar (1906–1988) | Persian poets | Tabriz, Iran | Maqbarat ol-Shoara |
| Abu Hamed Ghazali (1058–1111) | Persian theologian, philosopher and mystic | Tus, Iran | none |
| Ahmad Ghazali (1061–1126) | Persian writer and mystic and brother of Abu Hamed Ghazali | Qazvin, Iran | none |
| Omar Khayyám (1048–1131) | Persian poet | Nishapur, Iran | none |
| Sanai Ghaznavi (1080–1131) | Persian poet | Ghazni, Afghanistan | none |
| Sheikh Ruzbehan (1129–1209) | Persian mystic and poet | Shiraz, Iran | none |
| Nizami (1141–1209) | Persian poet | Ganja, Azerbaijan | Nezami Mausoleum |
| Attar (1145–1221) | Persian mystic and poet | Nishapur, Iran | none |
| Mowlavi (Rumi) (1207–1273) and Sultan Walad (d. 1312) | Persian mystics and poets | Konya, Turkey | Mevlana Museum |
| Saadi (1184–1291) | Persian poet | Shiraz, Iran | none |
| Hamdollah Mostowfi (1281–1349) | Persian historian and geographer | Qazvin, Iran | none |
| Khwaju Kermani (1280–1352) | Persian mystic and poet | Shiraz, Iran | none |
| Hafez (1315–1390) | Persian poet | Shiraz, Iran | Tomb of Hafez |
| Jami (1414–1492) | Persian mystic and poet | Herat, Afghanistan | none |
| Saib Tabrizi (1601–1677) | Persian poet | Isfahan, Iran | none |
| Mir Emad Qazvini (1553–1614) | Persian calligrapher | Isfahan, Iran | none |
| Sheikh Bahaii (1547–1621) | Persian architect and poet | Mashhad, Iran | none |
| Bidel Dehlavi (1640–1721) | Persian mystic and poet | Delhi, India | none |
| Kamal ol-Molk (1847–1940) | Iranian painter | Nishapur, Iran | none |
| Iraj Mirza (1874–1926), Bahar (1884–1951), Forugh Farrokhzad (1935–1967), Rahi Moayyeri (1909–1968), Darvish Khan (1872–1926), Ruhollah Khaleqi (1906–1965), Abolhasan Saba (1902–1957) and Qamar ol-Moluk Vaziri (1905–1959) | Persian poets, musicians and singers | Tehran, Iran | Zahir-od-dowleh cemetery |
| Sadeq Hedayat (1903–1951) and Gholam-Hossein Saedi (1936–1985) | Persian writers | Paris, France | Père Lachaise Cemetery |
| Salman the Persian | Persian companion of Muhammad | Salman Pak (ancient Ctesiphon), Iraq | none |

=== Turkish figures ===
| Person(s) | Significance | Location of Tomb | Article |
|---|---|---|---|
| Mustafa Kemal Atatürk | Founder and President of the Republic of Turkey | Anittepe quarter of Ankara, Turkey | Anıtkabir |

== Major figures in North American history ==
=== Mesoamerican figures ===
| Person(s) | Significance | Location of Tomb | Article |
|---|---|---|---|
| K'inich Yax K'uk' Mo' | Maya ruler (ruled 426 – c. 437) – named in Maya inscriptions as the founder and first ruler of the pre-Columbian Maya civilization polity centered at Copán | Copán in Mexico | Hunal tomb inside of Temple 16 in the Copán acropolis; |

=== Figures from the United States of America ===
| Person(s) | Significance | Location of Tomb | Article |
|---|---|---|---|
| Benjamin Franklin | Early American printer, inventor, and statesman | Christ Church Burial Ground in Philadelphia, Pennsylvania | Christ Church Burial Ground |
| Ulysses S. Grant | American Civil War general and 18th President of the United States | Riverside Park in Manhattan, New York, New York | Grant's Tomb |
| Thomas Jefferson | Author of the Declaration of Independence, founder of the University of Virginia, and 3rd President of the United States | Monticello, Virginia | none |
| Kamehameha and Kalākaua dynasties | Royal families of Hawaii | 2261 Nuuanu Avenue in Honolulu, Hawaii | Royal Mausoleum of Hawaii |
| Abraham Lincoln | 16th President of the United States | Oak Ridge Cemetery, Springfield, Illinois | Lincoln's Tomb |
| William McKinley | 25th President of the United States | Canton, Ohio | McKinley Memorial Mausoleum |
| Leland Stanford | Founder of Stanford University | Stanford University campus, Stanford, California | Stanford Mausoleum |
| George Washington | Revolutionary War general and 1st President of the United States | Mount Vernon, Virginia | none |

== Major religious figures ==
=== Judeo-Christian figures ===
| Person(s) | Significance | Location of Tomb | Article |
|---|---|---|---|
| Mary | Mother of Jesus | Believed to be in the Kidron Valley at the foot of the Mount of Olives or at Ephesus. (Catholic and Orthodox traditions profess that her body was taken into Heaven.) | Mary's Tomb, House of the Virgin Mary |
| Saint Peter | Apostle, first Bishop of Rome and co-founder of the Christian church | Directly below the altar of St Peter's Basilica, Vatican City | Saint Peter's tomb |
| Saint Thomas the Apostle | Apostle and later missionary to India and the first Catholicose of the East | Directly below the altar of San Thome Basilica in Mylapore near Chennai, India | Thomas the Apostle, St. Thomas Mount, San Thome Basilica |
| Saint Andrew | Apostle, first Bishop of Byzantium, and patron saint of Scotland, Greece, Russia, and Romania | Once in Patras, Achaea, Greece, now disputed; his body is said to be in both the cathedral of Amalfi, Campania, Italy, and in St Andrews, Scotland | Saint Andrew |
| Saint James the Great | Apostle and later missionary to Spain | Believed to be beneath the altar of the Cathedral of Santiago de Compostela, Galicia, Spain | Santiago de Compostela |
| Saint Thaddeus | one of the Twelve Apostles | near Maku, Iran | Saint Thaddeus Monastery |
| Saint Bartholomew | one of the Twelve Apostles | near Başkale (Albayrak)Turkey | Saint Bartholomew Monastery |
| Saint John the Apostle | Apostle and author of the Gospel of John and Revelation | Disputed; may be either on the island of Patmos, Greece, or at Selçuk, a small town in the vicinity of Ephesus in what is now Turkey | John the Apostle |
| Saint Augustine | Early Christian Bishop and theologian | San Pietro in Ciel d'Oro church in Pavia, Lombardy, Italy | San Pietro in Ciel d'Oro |
| St Clare of Assisi | Follower of St Francis; medieval ascetic saint and founder of the Order of Poor Ladies | Santa Chiara church in Assisi, Perugia, Italy (her body is said to be uncorrupted) | none |
| St Francis of Assisi | Medieval ascetic saint; founder of the Franciscan order | Basilica of San Francesco d'Assisi in Assisi, Perugia, Italy | Basilica of San Francesco d'Assisi |
| Abel | Son of Adam that was slain by his brother Cain | Buried near the Zabadani Valley in Syria | Nabi Habeel Mosque |
| Noah | Biblical patriarch | Nakhijevan | none |
| Abraham and Sarah, Isaac and Rebekah, Jacob and Leah | Biblical couples | Hebron, Palestine | Cave of the Patriarchs |
| Matriarchs | Zilpah, Bilhah, Jochebed, Zipporah, Elisheva and Avigail | Tiberias, Israel | Tomb of the Matriarchs |
| Reuben | eldest son of Jacob | Palmachim, Israel | Nabi Rubin |
| Rachel | wife of Jacob | Bethlehem, Palestine | Rachel's Tomb |
| Joseph | Hebrew patriarch | Nablus, Palestine | Joseph's Tomb |
| David | second king of Kingdom of Israel | Jerusalem, Israel | David's Tomb |
| Ezekiel | a Prophet in Hebrew Bible | Al Kifl, Iraq or Dezful, Iran | Ezekiel's Tomb |
| Daniel | a Prophet in Hebrew Bible | Susa, Iran | Tomb of Daniel |
| Ezra | a Prophet in Hebrew Bible | Al-Uzair near Basra, Iraq | Ezra's Tomb |
| Habakkuk | a Prophet in Hebrew Bible | Tuyserkan, Iran or Hukok, Israel | none |
| Job | Central figure of the Book of Job in the Bible | Claimed to be in the depopulated Palestinian village Dayr Ayyub, Ayodhya in India and outside the city of Salalah in southern Oman | Burial place of Job |
| Zechariah (priest) | Father of John the Baptist | Buried in Aleppo, Syria | Great Mosque of Aleppo |
| John the Baptist | Prophet in Christianity and Forerunner of Christ | His head is buried in Damascus, Syria | Umayyad Mosque |
| Jesus | The Messiah in Christianity and the son of God | Unknown. According to Christian belief, his tomb is located in the Church of the Holy Sepulchre, but he resurrected and went to heaven. | Tomb of Jesus |

=== Baháʼí figures ===
| Person(s) | Significance | Location of Tomb | Article |
|---|---|---|---|
| Bahá'u'lláh | Founder of the Baháʼí Faith; considered by Baháʼís to be the most recent messenger of God. | Buried in the Shrine of Bahá'u'lláh outside of Akka, Israel. | Shrine of Bahá'u'lláh, Bahá'u'lláh, Qiblih |
| The Báb | Founder of Bábism, and predecessor of Bahá'u'lláh. | Buried in the Shrine of the Báb on Mt. Carmel in Haifa, Israel. | Báb, Shrine of the Báb |
| `Abdu'l-Bahá | Son of Bahá'u'lláh and leader of the Baháʼí Faith | Buried in a chamber within the Shrine of the Báb on Mt. Carmel in Haifa, Israel. | `Abdu'l-Bahá, Shrine of the Báb, Shrine of `Abdu'l-Bahá |
| Shoghi Effendi | Great-grandson of Bahá'u'lláh; Under the title of Guardian, he served as last singular head of the faith. | Buried in New Southgate Cemetery in London, U.K. | Shoghi Effendi, Directions to the burial site of the Guardian |

=== Muslim figures ===
| Person(s) | Significance | Location of Tomb | Article |
|---|---|---|---|
| Muhammad | Prophet of Islām | Buried in Madīnah, Saudi Arabia | Masjidun Nabawi |
| Abu Bakr | First Companion, father in law of Muhammad, and first of the 4 Rashidun-Caliphs. | Buried in Madīnah To the Right side of Muhammad, Saudi Arabia | Masjidun Nabawi |
| Umar ibn al-Khattab | Second Companion, father in law of Muhammad, and second of the 4 Rashidun-Caliphs. | Buried in Madīnah To the Right side of Abu-Bakr, Saudi Arabia | Masjidun Nabawi |
| Uthman Ibn Affan | Third Companion, son in law of Muhammad, and third of the 4 Rashidun-Caliphs. | Buried within the former Mausolea of Jannatul Baqī‘ in Madīnah, Saudi Arabia | Jannatul Baqī‘ |
| Fātimah | Sunni Muslims believe that she is the youngest of 4 daughters and the wife of ‘Alī ibn Abī Tālib. The only daughter of Muhammad to outlive her father. The head of the only remaining seed of Muhammad till this day. Believed by Shia'a to be Muhammad's only daughter; while others are step-daughters. | Either buried within the former Mausolea of Jannatul Baqī‘, or within Masjidun Nabawi in Madīnah, Saudi Arabia | Burial place of Fatima |
| ‘Alī ibn Abī Tālib | Cousin of Muhammad, First Shī‘ah Imām and the only successor of Muhammad as accepted by Shī‘ah's | Exact location under dispute. Shia'a Records report Buried in Najaf, Iraq. Sunni Records claim exact location unknown somewhere in Kufa, Iraq. | |
| Hamza ibn Abdul-Muttalib | Uncle of Muhammad. One of the first converts and important figures in Early Islam. | Buried outside Madina Munawwara, Saudi Arabia. Unmarked grave, however, location is known in folk-tradition, and surrounded by security. | Near Archer's Hill, field of Battle of Uhud |
| Hasan ibn ‘Alī | Grandson of Muhammad, son of ‘Alī and Fātimah, and Second Twelver Shī‘ah Imām | Buried within the former Mausolea of Jannatul Baqī‘ in Madīnah, Saudi Arabia. Graves are unmarked, however, locations are known in folk tradition. | Jannatul Baqī‘ |
| Husayn ibn ‘Alī | Grandson of Muhammad, son of ‘Alī and Fātimah, and Third Twelver Shī‘ah Imām | Buried in Karbalā, Iraq | Imām Husayn Mosque |
| Khalid ibn al-Walid | Brilliant Military General, leader of Muslims Conquest of Syria. | Buried in Hims, Syria | Khaled Bin Al-Walid Mosque |
| Abu Ayyub al-Ansari | Companion of Muhammad. | Buried in Istanbul, Turkey | Eyüp Sultan Mosque |
| ‘Alī Zaynul ‘Ābidīn | Son of Husayn ibn ‘Alī and the Fourth Twelver Shī‘ah Imām | Buried within the former Mausolea of Jannatul Baqī‘ in Madīnah, Saudi Arabia. Graves are unmarked, however, locations are known in folk tradition. | |
| Muhammad al-Bāqir | Son of ‘Alī Zaynul ‘Ābidīn and the Fifth Twelver Shī‘ah Imām | Buried within the former Mausolea of Jannatul Baqī‘ in Madīnah, Saudi Arabia. Graves are unmarked, however, locations are known in folk tradition. | |
| Ja‘far as-Sādiq | Son of Muhammad al-Bāqir and the Sixth Twelver Shī‘ah Imām | Buried within the former Mausolea of Jannatul Baqī‘ in Madīnah, Saudi Arabia. Graves are unmarked, however, locations are known in folk tradition. | |
| Mūsā al-Kādhim | Son of Ja‘far as-Sādiq and the Seventh Twelver Shī‘ah Imām | Buried in Kadhimayn, Iraq | Al-Kadhimiya Mosque |
| ‘Alī ar-Ridhā | Son of Mūsā al-Kādhim and Eighth Twelver Shī‘ah Imām | Buried in Mashhad, Iran | Imām Ridhā Mosque |
| Muhammad at-Taqī | Son of ‘Alī ar-Ridhā and the Ninth Twelver Shī‘ah Imām | Buried in Kadhimayn, Iraq | Al-Kadhimiya Mosque |
| ‘Alī an-Naqī | Son of Muhammad at-Taqī and the Tenth Twelver Shī‘ah Imām | Buried in Sāmarrā', Iraq | Al-Askari Mosque |
| Hasan al-‘Askarī | Son of ‘Alī an-Naqī and the Eleventh Twelver Shī‘ah Imām | Buried in Sāmarrā', Iraq | Al-Askari Mosque |
| Saladdin | Army General and Leader of Ayyubids State. | Buried in Damascus, Syria | Near Umayyad Mosque |

== See also ==
- Tomb of the Unknown Soldier – about the concept, lists specific tombs by country
- List of papal tombs
