= List of mausolea =

List of mausoleums around the world

A mausoleum is an external free-standing building constructed as a monument enclosing the burial chamber of a deceased person or people. A mausoleum may be considered a type of tomb, or the tomb may be considered to be within the mausoleum. This is a list of mausolea around the world.

== Africa ==
=== Algeria ===
Mausoleum	Location	Description & Image
Royal Mausoleum of Mauretania	Tipaza Province	A monumental tomb of the Numidian Berber king Juba II and Queen Cleopatra Selene II.
Madghacen	Batna Province	A royal Numidian mausoleum dating back to the 3rd century BC.
Jedars	South of Tiaret	A series of thirteen ancient monumental Berber mausoleums.
Tomb of Masinissa	El Khroub	The tomb of Masinissa, an ancient Numidian king.
Mausoleum of Sidi Abderrahmane Et-Thaalibi	Algiers	The tomb of the patron saint of Algiers, Sidi Abderrahmane Et-Thaalibi.
El Alia Cemetery	Oued Smar	A cemetery in Algiers that contains the graves of numerous Algerian historical figures, including former presidents.

=== Benin ===
Mausoleum	Location	Description & Image
Mausoleum of Hubert Maga	Parakou	The tomb of Hubert Maga, the first President of Dahomey (now Benin).
Mausoleum of Mathieu Kérékou	Natitingou	The resting place of Mathieu Kérékou, who served as President of Benin from 1972 to 1991 and again from 1996 to 2006.

=== Burundi ===
Mausoleum	Location	Description & Image
Mausoleum of Pierre Nkurunziza	Gitega	The resting place of Pierre Nkurunziza, President of Burundi from 2005 to 2020. The mausoleum is officially named Mausolée du Guide Suprême du Patriotisme (Mausoleum of the Supreme Guide of Patriotism).

=== Comoros ===
Mausoleum	Location	Description & Image
Mausoleum of Ahmed Abdallah	Domoni	The tomb of Ahmed Abdallah, the first, third, and fifth President of the Comoros.

=== Republic of the Congo ===
Mausoleum	Location	Description & Image
Mausoleum of Marien Ngouabi	Brazzaville	A memorial and tomb for Marien Ngouabi, the third President of the Republic of the Congo.
Mausoleum of Pierre Savorgnan de Brazza	Brazzaville	A large memorial containing the remains of the Italo-French explorer Pierre Savorgnan de Brazza and his family.

=== Democratic Republic of the Congo ===
Mausoleum	Location	Description & Image
Mausoleum of Laurent-Désiré Kabila	Kinshasa	The resting place of Laurent-Désiré Kabila, the third President of the Democratic Republic of the Congo, located in front of the Palais de la Nation.
Mausoleum of Joseph Kasa-Vubu	Tshela	The tomb of Joseph Kasa-Vubu, the first President of the Democratic Republic of the Congo.

=== Eswatini ===
Mausoleum	Location	Description & Image
King Sobhuza II Memorial Park	Lobamba	A memorial and mausoleum for King Sobhuza II, who reigned for 82 years, one of the longest verifiable reigns of any monarch in recorded history.

=== Ethiopia ===
Mausoleum	Location	Description & Image
Grave of Meles Zenawi	Holy Trinity Cathedral, Addis Ababa	The burial site of Meles Zenawi, who served as President and later Prime Minister of Ethiopia. The cathedral is the final resting place of many notable Ethiopians, including Emperor Haile Selassie.

=== Gabon ===
Mausoleum	Location	Description & Image
Mausoleum of Omar Bongo	Franceville	A large, private mausoleum for Omar Bongo, who was President of Gabon for 42 years, from 1967 until his death in 2009.
Mausoleum of Léon M'ba	Libreville	A memorial tomb for Léon M'ba, the first President of Gabon.

=== Ghana ===
Mausoleum	Location	Description & Image
Kwame Nkrumah Mausoleum	Accra	A memorial park and mausoleum dedicated to Kwame Nkrumah, the first President of Ghana and a leading figure in the pan-African movement.
Asomdwee Park	Accra	The burial site of John Atta Mills, the third President of the Fourth Republic of Ghana.

=== Guinea ===
Mausoleum	Location	Description & Image
Camayanne Mausoleum	Within the Grand Mosque of Conakry, Conakry	The resting place of Guinea's national heroes, including Ahmed Sékou Touré, Samori Ture, and Alfa Yaya of Labé.

=== Guinea-Bissau ===
Mausoleum	Location	Description & Image
Mausoleum of Amílcar Cabral	Bissau	A memorial and tomb dedicated to Amílcar Cabral, an anti-colonial leader, intellectual, and diplomat.

=== Ivory Coast ===
Mausoleum	Location	Description & Image
Mausoleum of Félix Houphouët-Boigny	Yamoussoukro	The family tomb of Félix Houphouët-Boigny, the first President of Ivory Coast, located near the Basilica of Our Lady of Peace of Yamoussoukro.

=== Kenya ===
Mausoleum	Location	Description & Image
Mausoleum of Jomo Kenyatta	Nairobi	The resting place of Jomo Kenyatta, the first President of Kenya, located on the grounds of the Parliament Buildings. Access is generally restricted.
Tom Mboya Mausoleum	Rusinga Island	A mausoleum dedicated to Tom Mboya, a prominent Kenyan trade unionist and politician who was assassinated in 1969.

=== Liberia ===
Mausoleum	Location	Description & Image
Centennial Pavilion	Monrovia	The final resting place of former president William Tubman. The pavilion is also used for presidential inaugurations.

=== Malawi ===
Mausoleum	Location	Description & Image
Kamuzu Mausoleum	Lilongwe	A monumental marble and granite tomb dedicated to Malawi's first president, Hastings Kamuzu Banda.
Bingu wa Mutharika Mausoleum	Thyolo District	A large, modern mausoleum known as "Mpumulo wa Bata" (Peaceful Rest), housing the remains of Bingu wa Mutharika, the third President of Malawi.

=== Mozambique ===
Mausoleum	Location	Description & Image
Praça dos Heróis Moçambicanos (Heroes' Square)	Maputo	A national monument and public square that serves as the burial site for Mozambique's national heroes, including Samora Machel and Eduardo Mondlane.

=== Namibia ===
Mausoleum	Location	Description & Image
Heroes' Acre	Windhoek	An official war memorial of the Republic of Namibia. It includes a cemetery with the graves of national heroes and heroines, as well as an eternal flame and a large obelisk.

=== Nigeria ===
Mausoleum	Location	Description & Image
Mausoleum of Nnamdi Azikiwe	Onitsha	A mausoleum dedicated to Nnamdi Azikiwe, the first President of Nigeria.
Tomb of Abubakar Tafawa Balewa	Bauchi	The final resting place of Sir Abubakar Tafawa Balewa, the first and only Prime Minister of independent Nigeria.
Mausoleum of Sani Abacha	Kano	The tomb of Sani Abacha, the de facto President of Nigeria from 1993 to 1998.

=== South Sudan ===
Mausoleum	Location	Description & Image
Mausoleum of John Garang	Juba	The final resting place of Dr. John Garang de Mabior, a Sudanese politician and revolutionary leader, and the first President of Southern Sudan.

=== Sudan ===
Mausoleum	Location	Description & Image
Mausoleum of The Mahdi	Omdurman	The tomb of Muhammad Ahmad, a Sudanese religious leader of the Samaniyya order in Sudan who, on 29 June 1881, proclaimed himself the Mahdi.

=== Tunisia ===
Mausoleum	Location	Description & Image
Bourguiba mausoleum	Monastir	A monumental grave in Monastir, Tunisia, housing the remains of the former president Habib Bourguiba, the father of Tunisian independence.

=== Togo ===
Mausoleum	Location	Description & Image
Mausoleum of Gnassingbé Eyadéma	Pya, Kara	The family mausoleum of Gnassingbé Eyadéma, who was the president of Togo from 1967 until his death in 2005.

=== Zambia ===
Mausoleum	Location	Description & Image	
Embassy Park Presidential Burial Site	Lusaka	A national monument that serves as the burial site for the country's deceased presidents, including Levy Mwanawasa, Frederick Chiluba, and Michael Sata.	Mausoleum of Michael Sata

=== Zimbabwe ===
Mausoleum	Location	Description & Image
National Heroes' Acre	Harare	A national monument and burial ground administered by the National Museums and Monuments of Zimbabwe. It includes the Tomb of the Unknown Soldier.

== Asia ==
=== Afghanistan ===
Mausoleum	Location	Description & Image
Tomb of Ahmad Shah Durrani	Kandahar	The tomb of Ahmad Shah Durrani, the founder of the Durrani Empire. It is one of the most important historical monuments in Afghanistan.
Mausoleum of Abdur Rahman Khan	Kabul	A mausoleum located in Zarnegar Park in central Kabul, housing the tomb of the Emir of Afghanistan who ruled from 1880 to 1901.
Bagh-e Babur (Gardens of Babur)	Kabul	The final resting place of the first Mughal emperor, Babur. The garden complex also contains the tombs of other members of his family.
Mausoleum of Mohammad Zahir Shah	Teppe Maranjan Hill, Kabul	The tomb of Mohammad Zahir Shah, the last King of Afghanistan, who reigned for 40 years.

=== Armenia ===
Mausoleum	Location	Description & Image
Arshakid Mausoleum	Aghdzk	A mausoleum dedicated to the Arsacid kings of Armenia, built in the 4th century.
Mausoleum of Turkmen Emirs	Argavand	A 15th-century mausoleum dedicated to the emirs of the Kara Koyunlu dynasty.
Mausoleum of Gregory of Tatev	Tatev Monastery	The tomb of Saint Gregory of Tatev, a 14th-century philosopher, theologian, and saint of the Armenian Apostolic Church.

=== Azerbaijan ===
Mausoleum	Location	Description & Image
Momine Khatun Mausoleum	Nakhchivan	A 12th-century mausoleum, considered a masterpiece of Nakhchivan architecture. It was commissioned by Atabeg Jahan Pahlavan in honor of his mother.
Mausoleum of Yusif ibn Kuseyir	Nakhchivan	An octagonal mausoleum built in 1162, another prominent landmark of the Nakhchivan school of architecture.
Vagif Mausoleum	Shusha	A memorial to Molla Panah Vagif, an 18th-century Azerbaijani poet and vizier of the Karabakh Khanate.
Nizami Mausoleum	Ganja	A monument built in honor of the 12th-century Persian poet Nizami Ganjavi.
Mausoleum of Heydar Aliyev	Alley of Honor, Baku	The resting place of Heydar Aliyev, the third President of Azerbaijan.

=== Bangladesh ===
Mausoleum	Location	Description & Image
Mausoleum of Sheikh Mujibur Rahman	Tungipara, Gopalganj	The tomb of Sheikh Mujibur Rahman, the founding father and first President of Bangladesh.
Mausoleum of Three Leaders	Suhrawardy Udyan, Dhaka	The burial place of three prominent Bengali political leaders: A. K. Fazlul Huq, Huseyn Shaheed Suhrawardy, and Khawaja Nazimuddin.
Mausoleum of Ziaur Rahman	Chandrima Uddan, Dhaka	The tomb of Ziaur Rahman, the seventh President of Bangladesh.
Tomb of Shah Jalal	Sylhet	The shrine and tomb of Shah Jalal, a celebrated Sufi saint of Bengal.

=== Brunei ===
Mausoleum	Location	Description & Image
Royal Mausoleum (Kubah Makam Diraja)	Bandar Seri Begawan	The final resting place of several Sultans of Brunei and members of the royal family.
Mausoleum of Sultan Sharif Ali	Kota Batu	The tomb of Sharif Ali, the third Sultan of Brunei and the first to be a descendant of the Prophet Muhammad.
Mausoleum of Sultan Bolkiah	Kota Batu	The tomb of Bolkiah, the fifth Sultan of Brunei, whose reign is considered a golden age in the country's history.

=== China ===
Mausoleum	Location	Description & Image
Mausoleum of the First Qin Emperor	Xi'an, Shaanxi	The tomb of Qin Shi Huang, the first Emperor of China, famous for being guarded by the Terracotta Army. It is a UNESCO World Heritage Site.
Ming Dynasty Tombs	Beijing	A collection of mausoleums built by the emperors of the Ming dynasty. This site is also a UNESCO World Heritage Site.
Sun Yat-sen Mausoleum	Nanjing, Jiangsu	The tomb of Sun Yat-sen, the first president of the Republic of China.
Mausoleum of Mao Zedong	Tiananmen Square, Beijing	The final resting place of Mao Zedong, the chairman of the Chinese Communist Party.
Mausoleum of Genghis Khan	Ordos City, Inner Mongolia	A cenotaph dedicated to Genghis Khan, where he is worshipped as a deity. His actual burial site remains unknown.

=== India ===
Mausoleum	Location	Description & Image
Taj Mahal	Agra, Uttar Pradesh	A white marble mausoleum commissioned in 1632 by the Mughal emperor Shah Jahan to house the tomb of his favorite wife, Mumtaz Mahal. It is a UNESCO World Heritage Site.
Humayun's Tomb	Delhi	The tomb of the Mughal Emperor Humayun, commissioned by his first wife, Empress Bega Begum. It was the first garden-tomb on the Indian subcontinent.
Akbar's tomb	Agra, Uttar Pradesh	The tomb of the Mughal emperor Akbar. Its construction was started by Akbar himself in 1605.
Gol Gumbaz	Bijapur, Karnataka	The mausoleum of Mohammed Adil Shah, Sultan of Bijapur. It is noted for its massive dome, which is one of the largest in the world.
Tomb of Sher Shah Suri	Sasaram, Bihar	A mausoleum built in memory of the Pashtun emperor Sher Shah Suri, located in the middle of an artificial lake.

=== Indonesia ===
Mausoleum	Location	Description & Image
Grave of Sukarno (Makam Bung Karno)	Blitar, East Java	The burial site of Sukarno, the first President of Indonesia.
Astana Giribangun	Karanganyar Regency, Central Java	A mausoleum complex for the family of Suharto, the second President of Indonesia.
Imogiri	Imogiri, Central Java	A royal cemetery complex for the monarchs of the Mataram Sultanate and their descendants from Yogyakarta and Surakarta.
Mausoleum O. G. Khouw	Jakarta	A notable mausoleum of a prominent Peranakan Chinese aristocrat, O. G. Khouw.

=== Iran ===
Mausoleum	Location	Description & Image
Tomb of Cyrus the Great	Pasargadae	The final resting place of Cyrus the Great, the founder of the Achaemenid Empire. It is a UNESCO World Heritage Site.
Naqsh-e Rustam	Near Persepolis	Contains the rock-cut tombs of Achaemenid kings, including Darius the Great.
Imam Reza shrine	Mashhad	A vast complex that houses the tomb of the eighth Shia Imam, Ali al-Rida. It is a major pilgrimage site.
Mausoleum of Ruhollah Khomeini	Tehran	A massive complex housing the tomb of Ruhollah Khomeini, the founder of the Islamic Republic of Iran.
Tomb of Hafez (Hāfezieh)	Shiraz	A memorial hall and tomb dedicated to the celebrated Persian poet Hafez.

=== Iraq ===
Mausoleum	Location	Description & Image
Imam Ali Shrine	Najaf	According to Shia belief, it contains the tomb of Ali ibn Abi Talib, the first Shia Imam and the fourth Rashidun Caliph.
Imam Husayn Shrine	Karbala	Houses the tomb of Husayn ibn Ali, the grandson of the Prophet Muhammad. It is one of the holiest sites for Shia Muslims.
Al-Kadhimiya Mosque	Kadhimiya, Baghdad	Contains the tombs of the seventh and ninth Shia Imams, Musa al-Kadhim and Muhammad al-Jawad.
Al-Askari Shrine	Samarra	Contains the tombs of the tenth and eleventh Shia Imams, Ali al-Hadi and Hasan al-Askari.

=== Palestine ===
Mausoleum	Location	Description & Image
David's Tomb	Mount Zion, Jerusalem	A site considered by some to be the burial place of David, King of Israel.
Rachel's Tomb	Bethlehem	Revered as the burial place of the biblical matriarch Rachel.
Tomb of Samuel	Nabi Samwil	The traditional burial site of the biblical prophet Samuel.
Yad Avshalom	Kidron Valley, Jerusalem	An ancient monumental tomb, traditionally ascribed to Absalom, the rebellious son of King David.
Mausoleum of Yasser Arafat	Ramallah	The tomb of Yasser Arafat, former chairman of the Palestine Liberation Organization (PLO) and President of the Palestinian National Authority.

=== Japan ===
Mausoleum	Location	Description & Image	
Musashi Imperial Graveyard	Hachiōji, Tokyo	A mausoleum complex which contains the tombs of Emperor Taishō, Empress Teimei, Emperor Shōwa, and Empress Kōjun.	Mausoleum of Emperor Shōwa
Nikkō Tōshō-gū	Nikkō, Tochigi Prefecture	A UNESCO World Heritage Site and the final resting place of Tokugawa Ieyasu, the founder of the Tokugawa shogunate.	
Tsuki no wa no misasagi	Sennyū-ji, Kyoto	An imperial mausoleum containing the tombs of numerous Japanese emperors from the 13th to the 19th century.	
Zuihōden	Sendai, Miyagi Prefecture	The mausoleum complex of Date Masamune and his heirs, powerful daimyō of the Sendai Domain.	

=== Jordan ===
Mausoleum	Location	Description & Image
Al-Khazneh (The Treasury)	Petra	An elaborate temple carved out of sandstone, believed to be the mausoleum of the Nabataean King Aretas IV. It is a famous archaeological and tourist site.
Hashemite Family Cemetery	Amman	The royal cemetery of the Hashemite dynasty, the ruling royal family of Jordan.

=== Kazakhstan ===
Mausoleum	Location	Description & Image
Mausoleum of Khoja Ahmed Yasawi	Turkistan	A monumental, unfinished mausoleum commissioned in 1389 by Timur to honor the Sufi mystic Khoja Ahmed Yasawi. It is a UNESCO World Heritage Site.
Aisha Bibi Mausoleum	Near Taraz	An 11th or 12th-century mausoleum dedicated to the noblewoman Aisha Bibi, a figure from a local legend.

=== Kyrgyzstan ===
Mausoleum	Location	Description & Image
Uzgen mausoleums	Uzgen	A complex of three mausoleums from the 11th and 12th centuries, built for the rulers of the Kara-Khanid Khanate.

=== Malaysia ===
Mausoleum	Location	Description & Image
Makam Pahlawan (Heroes' Mausoleum)	National Mosque of Malaysia, Kuala Lumpur	The burial ground for several Malaysian leaders and Prime Ministers.
Mahmoodiah Royal Mausoleum	Johor Bahru, Johor	The royal mausoleum for the Sultans of Johor and their families.
Al-Ghufran Royal Mausoleum	Kuala Kangsar, Perak	The final resting place for the royal family of Perak.

=== Mongolia ===
Mausoleum	Location	Description & Image
Sükhbaatar's mausoleum	Sükhbaatar Square, Ulaanbaatar	The former mausoleum for Damdin Sükhbaatar, a Mongolian revolutionary leader. His remains were later removed and cremated.

=== Myanmar ===
Mausoleum	Location	Description & Image	
Martyrs' Mausoleum	Yangon	A mausoleum dedicated to Aung San and other leaders of the pre-independence interim government who were assassinated in 1947.	
Kandawmin Garden Mausolea	Yangon	A complex of mausoleums for Queen Supayalat, former UN Secretary-General U Thant, and other notable figures.	Mausoleum of Queen Supayalat
Konbaung tombs	Mandalay	A collection of tombs and mausoleums for the monarchs of the Konbaung dynasty.	Tomb of King Mindon Min

=== Pakistan ===
Mausoleum	Location	Description & Image
Mazar-e-Quaid	Karachi	The final resting place of Muhammad Ali Jinnah, the founder of Pakistan.
Tomb of Allama Iqbal	Lahore	The mausoleum of Sir Muhammad Iqbal, the national poet of Pakistan, located in the Hazuri Bagh garden.
Tomb of Jahangir	Shahdara, Lahore	The 17th-century mausoleum built for the Mughal Emperor Jahangir.
Data Durbar	Lahore	One of the largest Sufi shrines in South Asia, containing the tomb of the Sufi saint Ali Hujwiri.
Samadhi of Ranjit Singh	Lahore	A 19th-century mausoleum housing the funerary urns of the Sikh ruler Ranjit Singh.

=== Philippines ===
Mausoleum	Location	Description & Image
Quezon Memorial Circle	Quezon City	A national park and shrine containing the mausoleum of Manuel L. Quezon, the second President of the Philippines, and his wife, Aurora Quezon.
Aguinaldo Shrine	Kawit, Cavite	The ancestral home of Emilio Aguinaldo, the first President of the Philippines, where his remains are interred.
Marcos Museum and Mausoleum	Batac	The mausoleum houses the remains of Ferdinand E. Marcos, the tenth President of the Philippines.
Libingan ng mga Bayani (Cemetery of Heroes)	Taguig, Metro Manila	A national cemetery that houses the remains of Filipino presidents, national heroes, patriots, and soldiers.

=== Singapore ===
Mausoleum	Location	Description & Image
Keramat Habib Noh	Tanjong Pagar	The mausoleum for Habib Noh, a highly revered 19th-century Sufi saint in Singapore.
Keramat Iskandar Shah	Fort Canning Hill	The alleged burial place of Iskandar Shah, the last king of Singapura.

=== South Korea ===
Mausoleum	Location	Description & Image	
Royal Tombs of the Joseon Dynasty	Various locations	A collection of 40 tombs of members of the Korean Joseon dynasty. The sites are a UNESCO World Heritage Site.	Seonjeongneung Tombs in Seoul
Seoul National Cemetery	Seoul	A national cemetery that serves as the burial ground for Korean veterans, presidents, and other national figures.	

=== Syria ===
Mausoleum	Location	Description & Image	
Umayyad Mosque	Damascus	The mosque is believed to contain the head of John the Baptist. It also houses the shrine of Saladin in an adjacent garden.	Shrine of John the Baptist
Sayyidah Zaynab Mosque	Damascus	The tomb of Zaynab bint Ali, the granddaughter of the Prophet Muhammad. A major pilgrimage site for Shia Muslims.	
Sayyidah Ruqayya Mosque	Damascus	Contains the tomb of Sukayna bint Husayn (Ruqayya), the youngest daughter of Husayn ibn Ali.	
Nabi Habeel Mosque	Near Zabadani	Believed by some to be the burial place of Abel, son of Adam and Eve.	

=== Taiwan ===
Mausoleum	Location	Description & Image
Cihu Presidential Burial Place	Daxi District, Taoyuan	The temporary resting place of Chiang Kai-shek, former president of the Republic of China.
Touliao Mausoleum	Daxi District, Taoyuan	The temporary resting place of Chiang Ching-kuo, son of Chiang Kai-shek and former president of the Republic of China.

=== Turkmenistan ===
Mausoleum	Location	Description & Image
Türkmenbaşy Ruhy Mosque	Gypjak, near Ashgabat	A large complex that includes the mausoleum of Saparmurat Niyazov, the first President of Turkmenistan.
Mausoleum of Il-Arslan	Konye-Urgench	A 12th-century mausoleum, one of the few surviving monuments from the capital of the Khwarazmian Empire.

=== Turkey ===
Mausoleum	Location	Description & Image
Anıtkabir	Ankara	The mausoleum of Mustafa Kemal Atatürk, the founder and first President of the Republic of Turkey. It is a site of national pilgrimage.
Mausoleum at Halicarnassus	Bodrum (ancient Halicarnassus)	The tomb of Mausolus, a satrap in the Persian Empire. It was one of the Seven Wonders of the Ancient World and the origin of the word "mausoleum". Only ruins remain today.
Mevlana Museum	Konya	The mausoleum of Jalal ad-Din Muhammad Rumi, a 13th-century Persian poet, Islamic scholar, and Sufi mystic.
Green Tomb (Yeşil Türbe)	Bursa	The mausoleum of the fifth Ottoman Sultan, Mehmed I.

=== Uzbekistan ===
Mausoleum	Location	Description & Image
Gur-e-Amir	Samarkand	The mausoleum of the Turco-Mongol conqueror Timur (Tamerlane), the founder of the Timurid Empire.
Shah-i-Zinda	Samarkand	A necropolis consisting of a series of mausoleums and other ritual buildings from the 9th to 15th centuries. It is believed to contain the tomb of Kusam ibn Abbas, a cousin of the Prophet Muhammad.
Samanid Mausoleum	Bukhara	The 10th-century resting place of Ismail Samani, a powerful ruler of the Samanid Empire. It is a masterpiece of Central Asian architecture.

=== Vietnam ===
Mausoleum	Location	Description & Image
Ho Chi Minh Mausoleum	Ba Đình Square, Hanoi	The final resting place of Ho Chi Minh, the revolutionary leader and first President of Vietnam.
Tomb of Tự Đức	Huế	An elegant complex of pavilions, a lake, and the tomb of the Nguyễn Emperor Tự Đức.
Tomb of Khải Định	Huế	An elaborate mausoleum for the Nguyễn Emperor Khải Định, known for its blend of Vietnamese and European architectural styles.

== Europe ==
=== Albania ===
Mausoleum	Location	Description & Image
Mausoleum of the Albanian Royal Family	Tirana	The resting place of King Zog I, his wife Queen Géraldine, and other members of the Albanian royal family.

=== Austria ===
Mausoleum	Location	Description & Image	
Imperial Crypt (Kaisergruft)	Capuchin Church, Vienna	The principal place of entombment for the members of the House of Habsburg, containing the remains of 12 emperors and 18 empresses.	Interior of the Imperial Crypt
Mausoleum of Emperor Ferdinand II	Graz	A monumental tomb complex built in the 17th century for the Holy Roman Emperor Ferdinand II.	

=== Belgium ===
Mausoleum	Location	Description & Image
Mausoleum of the Counts of Bossu	Boussu	A Renaissance-style chapel mausoleum designed by Jacques Du Brœucq for the Hénin-Liétard family.

=== Bosnia and Herzegovina ===
Mausoleum	Location	Description & Image
Gazi Husrev-beg's Turbe	Sarajevo	The tomb of Gazi Husrev-beg, an Ottoman bey and military strategist who was a key figure in the history of Sarajevo.
Tomb of Alija Izetbegović	Kovači Cemetery, Sarajevo	The burial site of Alija Izetbegović, the first Chairman of the Presidency of Bosnia and Herzegovina.

=== Bulgaria ===
Mausoleum	Location	Description & Image	
Battenberg Mausoleum	Sofia	The tomb of Prince Alexander I of Battenberg, the first prince of modern Bulgaria.	
St George the Conqueror Chapel Mausoleum	Pleven	A memorial chapel and ossuary built in honor of the soldiers who died during the Siege of Plevna in 1877.	
Georgi Dimitrov Mausoleum	Sofia	The former resting place of the first communist leader of Bulgaria, Georgi Dimitrov. The building was demolished in 1999.	The mausoleum before demolition

=== Croatia ===
Mausoleum	Location	Description & Image
Meštrović family mausoleum	Otavice	The final resting place of the sculptor Ivan Meštrović and his family, a significant work of art in its own right.
Jelačić family tomb	Zaprešić	The tomb of the influential Jelačić family, including Ban Josip Jelačić.
Tomb of Franjo Tuđman	Mirogoj Cemetery, Zagreb	The burial site of Franjo Tuđman, the first President of Croatia.

=== Czech Republic ===
Mausoleum	Location	Description & Image
National Monument in Vítkov	Prague	Originally built as a memorial to the Czechoslovak Legionaries, it later housed the mausoleum of Klement Gottwald, the first communist president of Czechoslovakia.
Mausoleum of Yugoslavian Soldiers in Olomouc	Olomouc	A mausoleum and ossuary containing the remains of over 1,100 Yugoslav soldiers who died in Austro-Hungarian camps during World War I.

=== Finland ===
Mausoleum	Location	Description & Image
Juselius Mausoleum	Pori	A neo-Gothic mausoleum built in 1903 by the industrialist Fritz Arthur Jusélius in memory of his daughter Sigrid. It is famous for its original frescoes by Akseli Gallen-Kallela.

=== France ===
Mausoleum	Location	Description & Image
The Panthéon	Paris	A monumental neoclassical building originally built as a church dedicated to St. Genevieve, it now functions as a secular mausoleum containing the remains of distinguished French citizens such as Voltaire, Rousseau, Victor Hugo, and Marie Curie.
Les Invalides	Paris	A complex of buildings containing museums and monuments, all relating to the military history of France. It contains the tomb of Napoleon Bonaparte.
Basilica of Saint-Denis	Saint-Denis, near Paris	A large medieval abbey church that served as the burial site for nearly every French king from the 10th to the 18th centuries.

=== Germany ===
Mausoleum	Location	Description & Image
Bismarck Mausoleum	Friedrichsruh	The mausoleum of Prince Otto von Bismarck and his wife, Johanna von Puttkamer.
Mausoleum in the Schlosspark Charlottenburg	Charlottenburg Palace, Berlin	A neoclassical mausoleum that contains the tombs of members of the House of Hohenzollern, including King Frederick William III and Queen Louise.
The Carstanjen Mausoleum	Bonn	A Grecian rotunda at Haus Carstanjen.

=== Hungary ===
Mausoleum	Location	Description & Image	
Kerepesi Cemetery	Budapest	A major national cemetery with numerous elaborate mausoleums, including those of prominent Hungarian figures like Lajos Kossuth, Ferenc Deák, and Lajos Batthyány.	Mausoleum of Lajos Kossuth
Tomb of Gül Baba	Budapest	The tomb of Gül Baba, an Ottoman Bektashi dervish, poet, and companion of Sultan Suleiman the Magnificent.	

=== Italy ===
Mausoleum	Location	Description & Image
Mausoleum of Augustus	Rome	A large tomb built by the Roman Emperor Augustus in 28 BC for himself and his family.
Castel Sant'Angelo	Rome	Originally built as a mausoleum for the Roman Emperor Hadrian and his family. It was later used by the popes as a fortress and castle.
The Pantheon	Rome	An ancient Roman temple, now a church, which serves as the burial place for notable Italians, including the artist Raphael and several Italian kings.
Mausoleum of Theodoric	Ravenna	An ancient monument built by Theodoric the Great as his future tomb. It is a UNESCO World Heritage Site.

=== Netherlands ===
Mausoleum	Location	Description & Image
Nieuwe Kerk	Delft	The burial site of the Dutch Royal Family since William the Silent in 1584.
Mausoleum of Wilhelm II	Huis Doorn, Doorn	The final resting place of the last German Emperor, Wilhelm II.

=== Poland ===
Mausoleum	Location	Description & Image
Karol Scheibler's Chapel	Old Cemetery, Łódź	An eclectic, richly decorated mausoleum of the industrialist Karol Scheibler, completed in 1888.
Powązki Military Cemetery	Warsaw	A military cemetery containing numerous tombs and monuments dedicated to Polish soldiers and national heroes.

=== Romania ===
Mausoleum	Location	Description & Image
Mausoleum of Mărășești	Mărășești	A memorial dedicated to the Romanian soldiers who fought in World War I, containing the remains of over 5,000 soldiers.
Tropaeum Traiani	Adamclisi	An ancient Roman monument built in AD 109 in Moesia Inferior, to commemorate Roman Emperor Trajan's victory over the Dacians.
Mausoleum in Carol Park	Carol Park, Bucharest	Originally built as a mausoleum for communist leaders, it now serves as a memorial for unknown soldiers.

=== Russia ===
Mausoleum	Location	Description & Image
Lenin's Mausoleum	Red Square, Moscow	The final resting place of Vladimir Lenin, the leader of the Bolshevik Revolution and first head of the Soviet Union.
Cathedral of the Archangel	Moscow Kremlin	The burial place of many of Russia's tsars and grand princes from the 14th to the 17th centuries, including Ivan the Terrible.
Peter and Paul Cathedral	Peter and Paul Fortress, Saint Petersburg	The burial place of most of the Russian emperors and empresses from Peter the Great to Nicholas II and his family.

=== Serbia ===
Mausoleum	Location	Description & Image
Oplenac	Topola	The Church of St. George, also known as Oplenac, is the mausoleum of the Serbian and Yugoslav royal house of Karađorđević.
Kuća cveća (House of Flowers)	Belgrade	The resting place of Josip Broz Tito, the leader of the Socialist Federal Republic of Yugoslavia.
Josif Pančić mausoleum	Pančić's Peak	The resting place of Josif Pančić, famed Serbian botanist and academic.

=== Spain ===
Mausoleum	Location	Description & Image
El Escorial	San Lorenzo de El Escorial	A historical residence of the King of Spain. The Royal Crypt serves as the burial site for most of the Spanish monarchs since the 16th century.
Valle de los Caídos (Valley of the Fallen)	San Lorenzo de El Escorial	A monumental complex that includes a basilica and a mausoleum. It was the burial place of the Spanish dictator Francisco Franco until 2019.

=== Ukraine ===
Mausoleum	Location	Description & Image	
Nikolay Pirogov's Mausoleum	Vinnytsia	A mausoleum-church where the embalmed body of the renowned scientist and surgeon Nikolay Pirogov is preserved.	Portrait of Nikolay Pirogov

=== United Kingdom ===
Mausoleum	Location	Description & Image
Royal Mausoleum, Frogmore	Frogmore, Windsor	The mausoleum for Queen Victoria and her consort, Albert, Prince Consort.
Hamilton Mausoleum	Hamilton, South Lanarkshire, Scotland	A large mausoleum built for Alexander Hamilton, 10th Duke of Hamilton. It is famous for its long-lasting echo.
Darnley Mausoleum	Kent	An 18th-century mausoleum designed by James Wyatt for the Earls of Darnley.
Mausoleum of Sir Richard and Lady Burton	Mortlake, London	A unique tomb in the shape of a Bedouin tent, designed by the explorer Richard Francis Burton for himself and his wife, Isabel.

== North America ==
=== Canada ===
Mausoleum	Location	Description & Image	
Mount Royal Cemetery	Montreal, Quebec	Features several large, historic mausoleums, including the Molson and Notman family tombs.	Molson family mausoleum
Hart Massey's Mausoleum	Mount Pleasant Cemetery, Toronto	A notable example of Prairie School architecture, designed by Sidney Badgley in 1907 for the prominent Massey family.	

=== Cuba ===
Mausoleum	Location	Description & Image
Che Guevara Mausoleum	Santa Clara	A memorial complex housing the remains of the Marxist revolutionary Che Guevara and his fellow combatants.
José Martí Mausoleum	Santa Ifigenia Cemetery, Santiago de Cuba	A large, hexagonal tower serving as the tomb of José Martí, a Cuban national hero and a key figure in Latin American literature.

=== Mexico ===
Mausoleum	Location	Description & Image
Angel of Independence (El Ángel)	Mexico City	A victory column and monument that also serves as a mausoleum for the heroes of the Mexican War of Independence.
Monumento a la Revolución	Mexico City	A monument commemorating the Mexican Revolution, which also houses the tombs of several revolutionary heroes, including Pancho Villa.
Mausoleum of Ignacio Zaragoza	Puebla de Zaragoza	A monumental fountain and mausoleum housing the remains of General Ignacio Zaragoza, commanding officer in the Battle of Puebla
Plaza Revolución del Sur	Cuautla de Morelos	Town square and resting place of revolutionary leader Emiliano Zapata

=== United States ===
Mausoleum	Location	Description & Image
Grant's Tomb	New York City	The final resting place of Ulysses S. Grant, 18th President of the United States, and his wife, Julia Grant. It is the largest mausoleum in North America.
Lincoln Tomb	Springfield, Illinois	The state historic site that serves as the final resting place of Abraham Lincoln, 16th President of the United States, his wife, and three of their four sons.
James A. Garfield Memorial	Cleveland, Ohio	A monumental tomb and memorial for James A. Garfield, 20th President of the United States.
Stanford Mausoleum	Stanford University, California	The tomb of Leland Stanford, his wife Jane, and their son Leland Stanford Jr., located on the grounds of the university they founded.

== South America ==
=== Argentina ===
Mausoleum	Location	Description & Image	
Buenos Aires Metropolitan Cathedral	Buenos Aires	Contains the mausoleum of General José de San Martín, one of the primary leaders of South America's struggle for independence.	
La Recoleta Cemetery	Buenos Aires	A famous cemetery known for its numerous elaborate mausoleums, including the tomb of Eva Perón.	Mausoleums in La Recoleta
Mausoleum of Néstor Kirchner	Río Gallegos	A large, modern mausoleum for Néstor Kirchner, who was President of Argentina from 2003 to 2007.	

=== Bolivia ===
Mausoleum	Location	Description & Image
Cathedral Basilica of Our Lady of Peace	La Paz	Contains the mausoleum of Marshal Andrés de Santa Cruz, who served as President of Peru and Bolivia.

=== Brazil ===
Mausoleum	Location	Description & Image
Monument to the Independence of Brazil	São Paulo	A monumental complex that includes a crypt and the mausoleum of Emperor Pedro I of Brazil and his two wives.
Imperial Mausoleum	Cathedral of Petrópolis, Petrópolis	The final resting place of Emperor Pedro II of Brazil and other members of the Brazilian imperial family.
JK Memorial	Brasília	The burial place of Juscelino Kubitschek, the president of Brazil who was the visionary behind the construction of Brasília.
Obelisk of São Paulo	São Paulo	A mausoleum dedicated to the students and soldiers killed in the Constitutionalist Revolution of 1932.

=== Chile ===
Mausoleum	Location	Description & Image
Altar de la Patria	Santiago	A former mausoleum that housed the remains of Bernardo O'Higgins, the founding father of Chile. His remains were later moved to the Crypt of O'Higgins.

=== Colombia ===
Mausoleum	Location	Description & Image	
Central Cemetery of Bogotá	Bogotá	A large cemetery containing numerous elaborate mausoleums for many former presidents of Colombia and other notable figures.	Central Cemetery of Bogotá

=== Paraguay ===
Mausoleum	Location	Description & Image
National Pantheon of the Heroes	Asunción	A national monument and mausoleum housing the remains of many of the country's major historical figures.

=== Peru ===
Mausoleum	Location	Description & Image
Panteón de los Próceres	Lima	A crypt within the former church of the Real Convictorio de San Carlos that holds the remains of the heroes of the Peruvian War of Independence.
Presbítero Maestro Cemetery	Lima	A monumental cemetery famous for the large number of elaborate 19th and 20th-century mausoleums.

=== Uruguay ===
Mausoleum	Location	Description & Image	
Artigas Mausoleum	Plaza Independencia, Montevideo	An underground mausoleum dedicated to the national hero José Gervasio Artigas. His remains are kept in an urn in the center.	Inside the Artigas Mausoleum

=== Venezuela ===
Mausoleum	Location	Description & Image
National Pantheon of Venezuela	Caracas	A former church that was converted into a national pantheon and serves as the final resting place for prominent Venezuelans, including Simón Bolívar.
Mausoleum of Hugo Chávez	Cuartel de la Montaña, Caracas	The final resting place of Hugo Chávez, who was President of Venezuela from 1999 to 2013.

== Oceania ==
=== Australia ===
Mausoleum	Location	Description & Image
Shrine of Remembrance	Melbourne	Originally built as a memorial to the men and women of Victoria who served in World War I, it now serves as a memorial for all Australians who have served in any war.
Tomb of the Unknown Australian Soldier	Australian War Memorial, Canberra	Located in the Hall of Memory, it holds the remains of an unidentified Australian soldier killed on the Western Front in World War I.

=== New Zealand ===
Mausoleum	Location	Description & Image
Massey Memorial	Wellington	The final resting place of William Massey, a former prime minister of New Zealand, and his wife.
Savage Memorial	Bastion Point, Auckland	A memorial and tomb for Michael Joseph Savage, the first Labour Prime Minister of New Zealand.

== See also ==
- List of tombs
- Cemetery
- Necropolis
- List of memorials
