= Tomb =

Repository for the remains of the dead

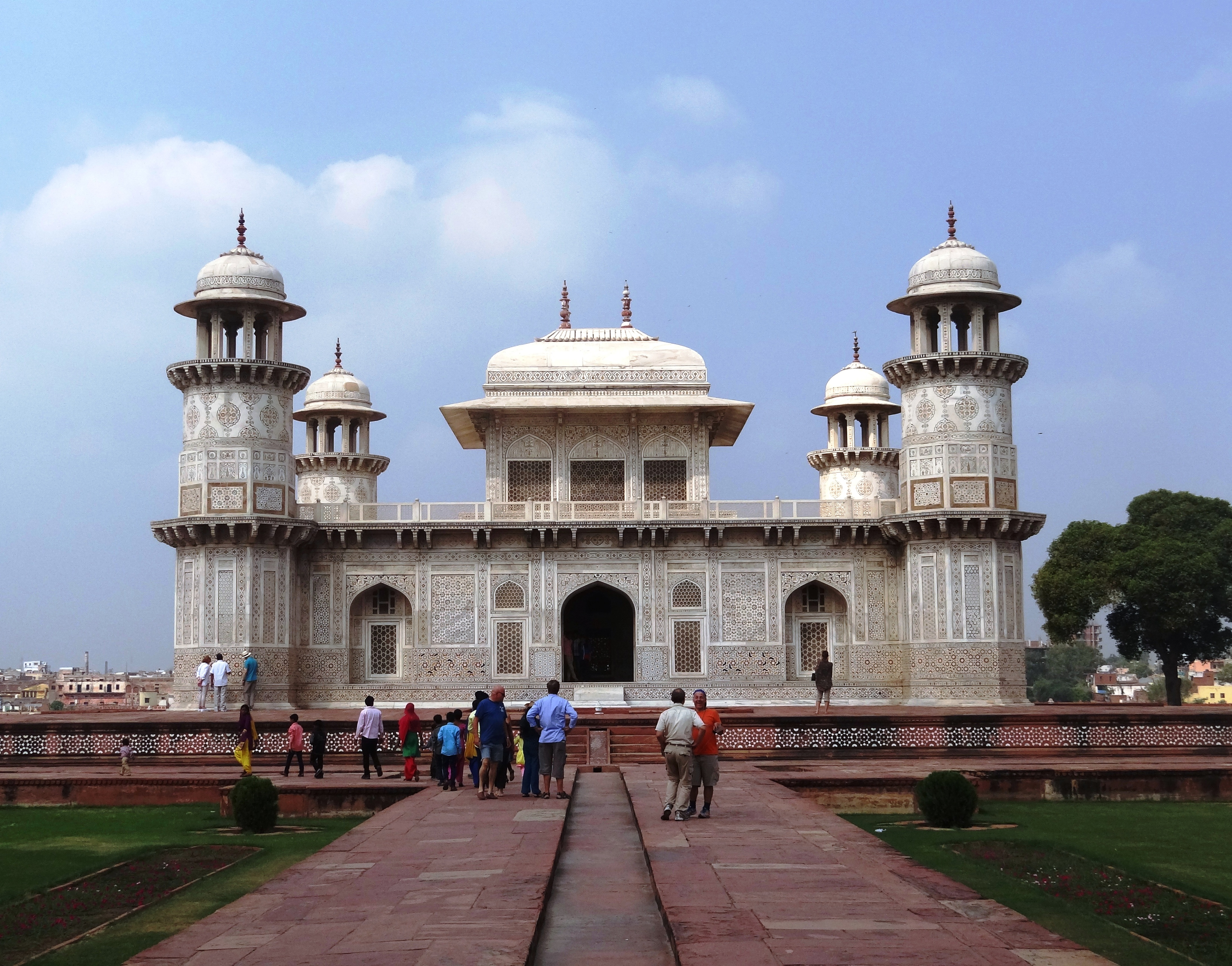
The Tomb of I'timād-ud-Daulah in Agra, India

A tomb (from Ancient Greek: τύμβος tumbos, meaning "mound" or "burial monument") is a repository for the remains of the dead. It may be above or below ground and can vary greatly in form, size, and cultural significance. Tombs are one of the oldest forms of funerary monuments, serving both as a means of final disposition and as expressions of religious belief, commemoration, and social status.

Placing a body in a tomb can be called entombment, distinct from simpler burial practices. Tombs often involve architectural or artistic design and can become significant cultural or religious landmarks.

== Types of tombs ==
The term "tomb" encompasses a wide variety of structures and traditions, ranging from prehistoric burial mounds to elaborate monumental mausoleums.

=== Prehistoric and ancient tombs ===
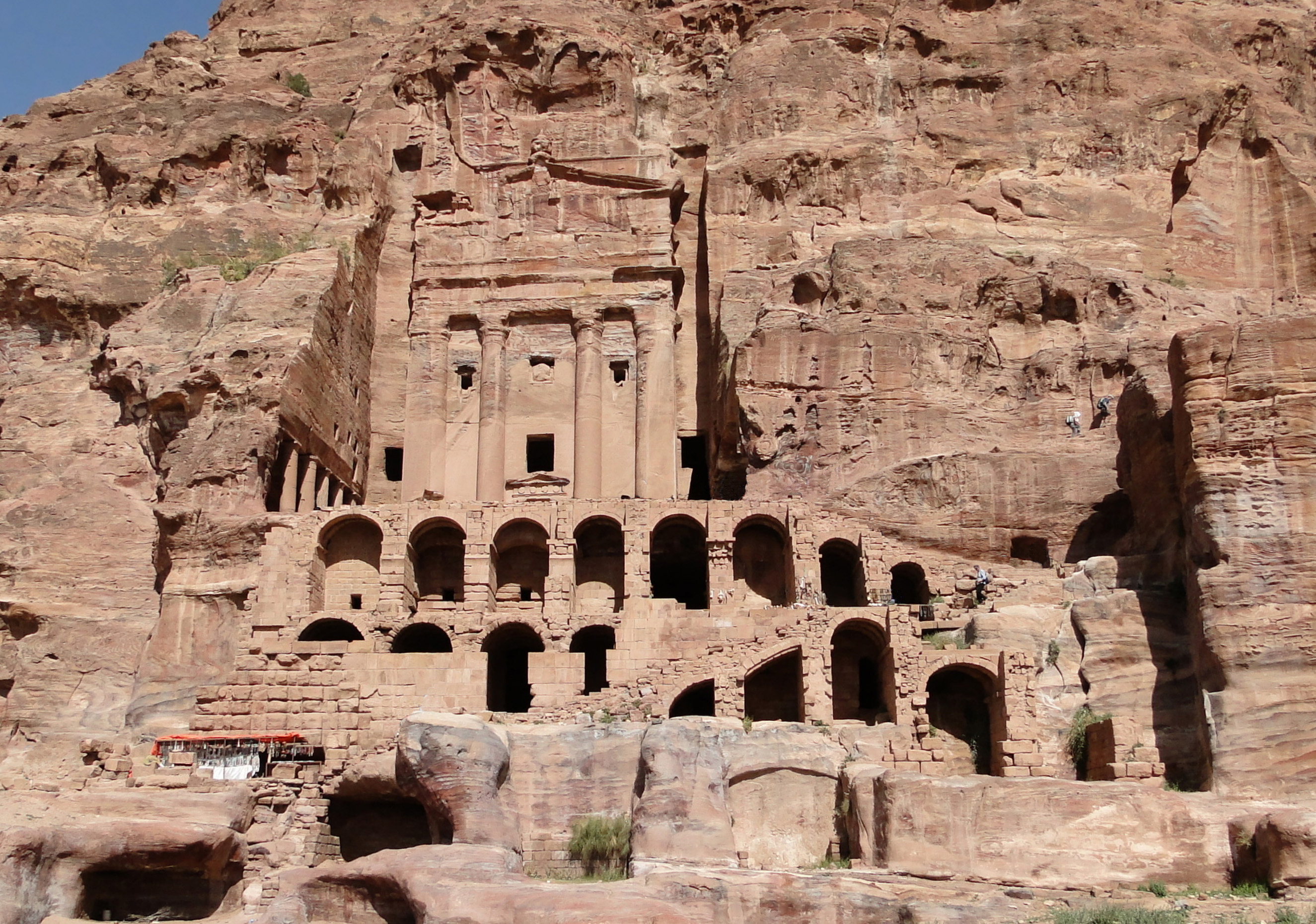
The Urn Tomb at Petra, Jordan

Many early societies constructed tombs using earth, stone, and timber, often imbued with religious or ritual significance.

- Tumulus (plural: tumuli): A mound of earth and stones raised over one or more graves. Known also as barrows, burial mounds, or kurgans, these can be found in Europe, Asia, and the Americas.
- Megalithic tomb: Constructed of large stones (megaliths) and originally covered by earth; includes dolmens and chamber tombs.
- Rock-cut tomb: Carved directly into solid rock, varying from simple caves to elaborate façades. Found in ancient Egypt, Lycia, and the city of Petra in Jordan.
- Pyramid: Monumental tombs or ceremonial structures, especially in Ancient Egypt and Mesoamerica. The Great Pyramid of Giza is the largest pyramid in the world by volume.
- Ship burial: A practice of placing the deceased in a ship along with grave goods, common among Vikings and Germanic peoples (e.g., the Oseberg Ship burial).
- Grave field: Large prehistoric cemeteries with multiple tombs, found in many early cultures.

=== Architectural tombs and monuments ===
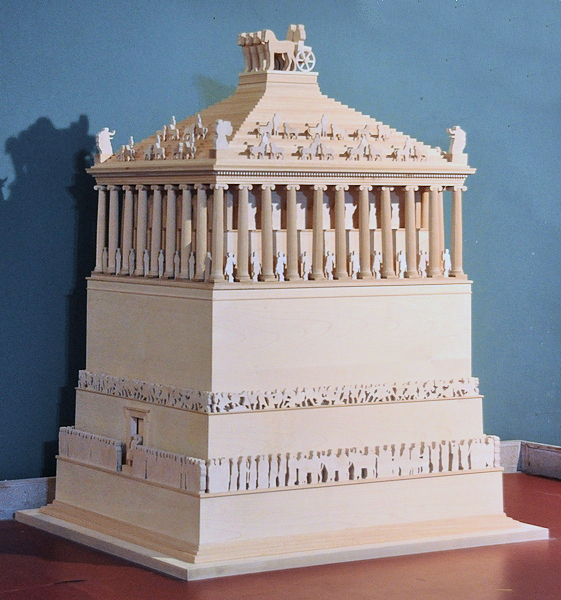
Reconstruction model of the Mausoleum at Halicarnassus

Freestanding and often monumental tombs became important markers of dynastic, royal, or religious power.

- Mausoleum: External free-standing structures serving as both monuments and interment spaces. The Mausoleum at Halicarnassus was one of the Seven Wonders of the Ancient World.
- Sarcophagus: A stone container for a body or coffin, often decorated with reliefs and inscriptions. Sarcophagi were prominent in Egypt, Greece, Rome, and Byzantium.
- Pillar tomb: A monumental grave marked by a pillar or column, common in parts of Africa and Arabia.
- Martyrium: A Christian building marking the site of a martyr’s tomb, often circular or polygonal, such as San Pietro in Montorio.
- Stećak: A monumental medieval tombstone richly decorated with reliefs, found in Bosnia and Herzegovina, Croatia, Montenegro, and Serbia.

=== Tombs within religious contexts ===
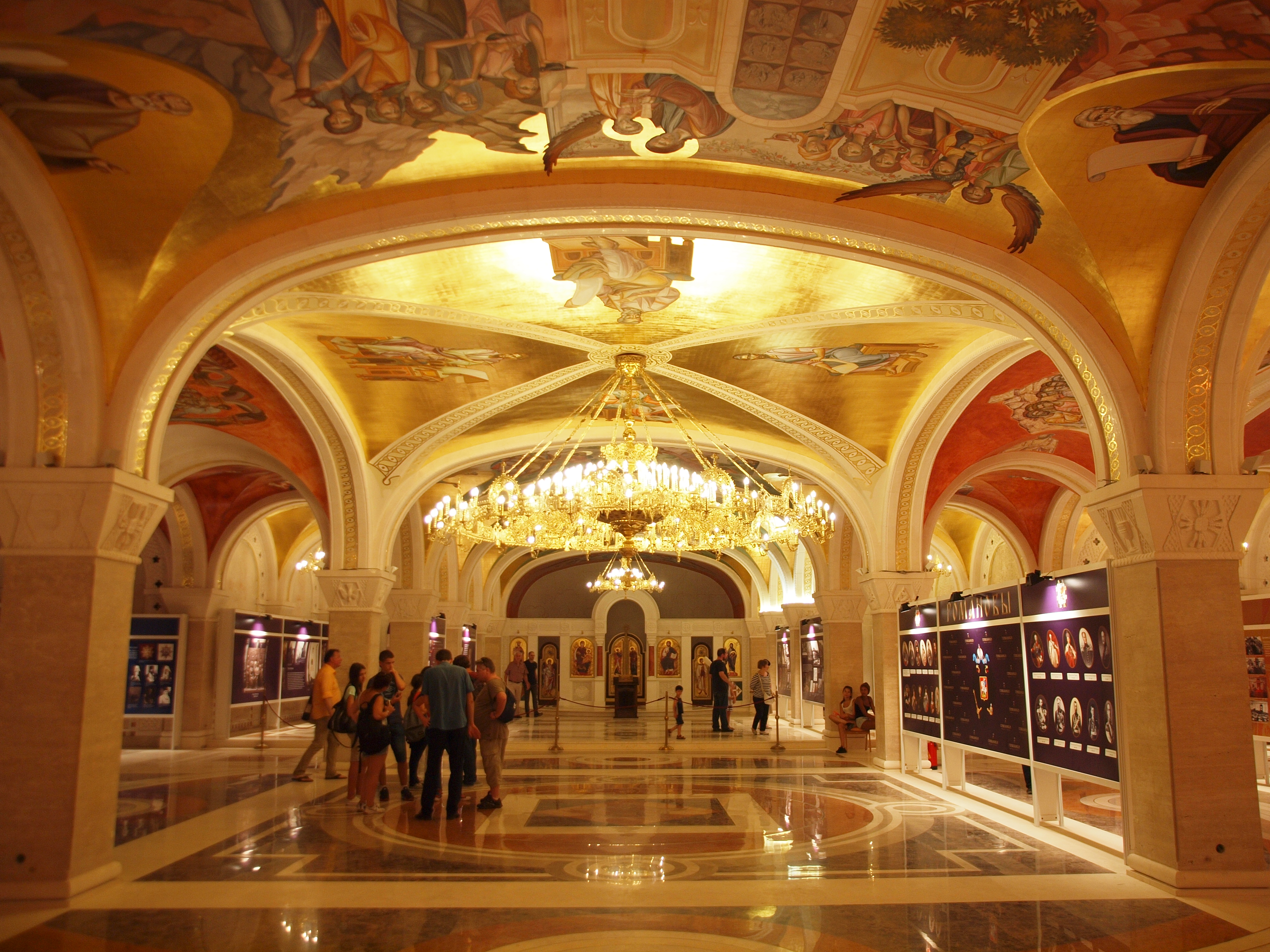
Crypt of the Church of Saint Sava, Belgrade

Many religious traditions incorporate tombs into sacred buildings or cemeteries.

- Burial vault: An underground stone or brick-lined chamber, often family-owned, located in cemeteries or beneath churches.
- Crypt: An underground chamber beneath a church, often used for bishops, saints, or patrons.
- Church monument: An effigy-bearing monument within a church, commemorating nobles or clergy.
- Charnel house: A building for storing skeletal remains, common in medieval Europe.
- Shrine: A structure above the first burial place of a saint, distinct from a reliquary.
- Sepulchre: A cavernous rock-cut tomb, particularly in Jewish and Christian traditions (e.g., the Holy Sepulchre in Jerusalem).
- Ohel: A structure around the grave of a Hasidic leader.
- Islamic tombs: Mausoleums or shrines called Mazar, Türbe, Qubba, Dargah, or Gongbei, often places of pilgrimage.
- Samadhi: In India, a tomb-shrine for saints, combining funerary and devotional elements.

== Symbolism and cultural significance ==
Tombs embody the beliefs, values, and aesthetics of the societies that created them. They may symbolize:

- continuity of life after death,
- political power and dynastic legitimacy,
- artistic expression through sculpture, painting, and architecture,
- pilgrimage and veneration, especially in religious contexts.

== Notable examples ==
Some of the most famous tombs worldwide include:

- The Great Pyramid of Giza, tomb of the pharaoh Khufu.
- The Taj Mahal in Agra, India, mausoleum for Mumtaz Mahal.
- The Mausoleum at Halicarnassus, one of the Seven Wonders.
- The Mausoleum of the First Qin Emperor, guarded by the Terracotta Army.
- The Church of the Holy Sepulchre in Jerusalem, containing the empty tomb of Jesus.
- The Daisen Kofun in Japan, the tomb of Emperor Nintoku, the largest tomb in the world by area.
- Numerous national Tombs of the Unknown Soldier, such as at the Arc de Triomphe in Paris or Arlington National Cemetery.

== Gallery of tomb types ==
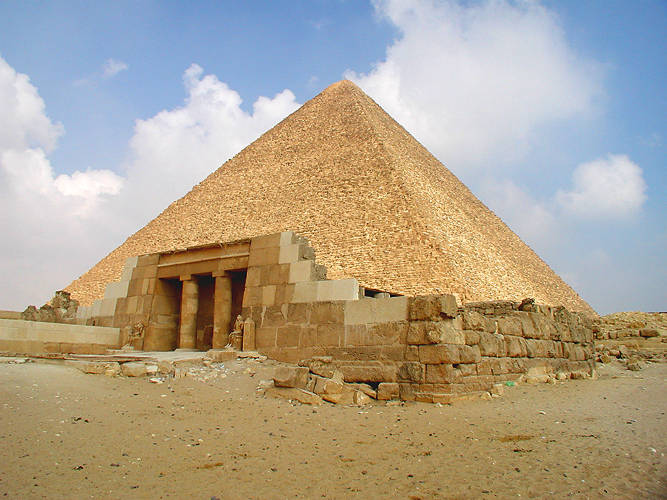
The Pyramid of Khufu, a pyramid tomb.

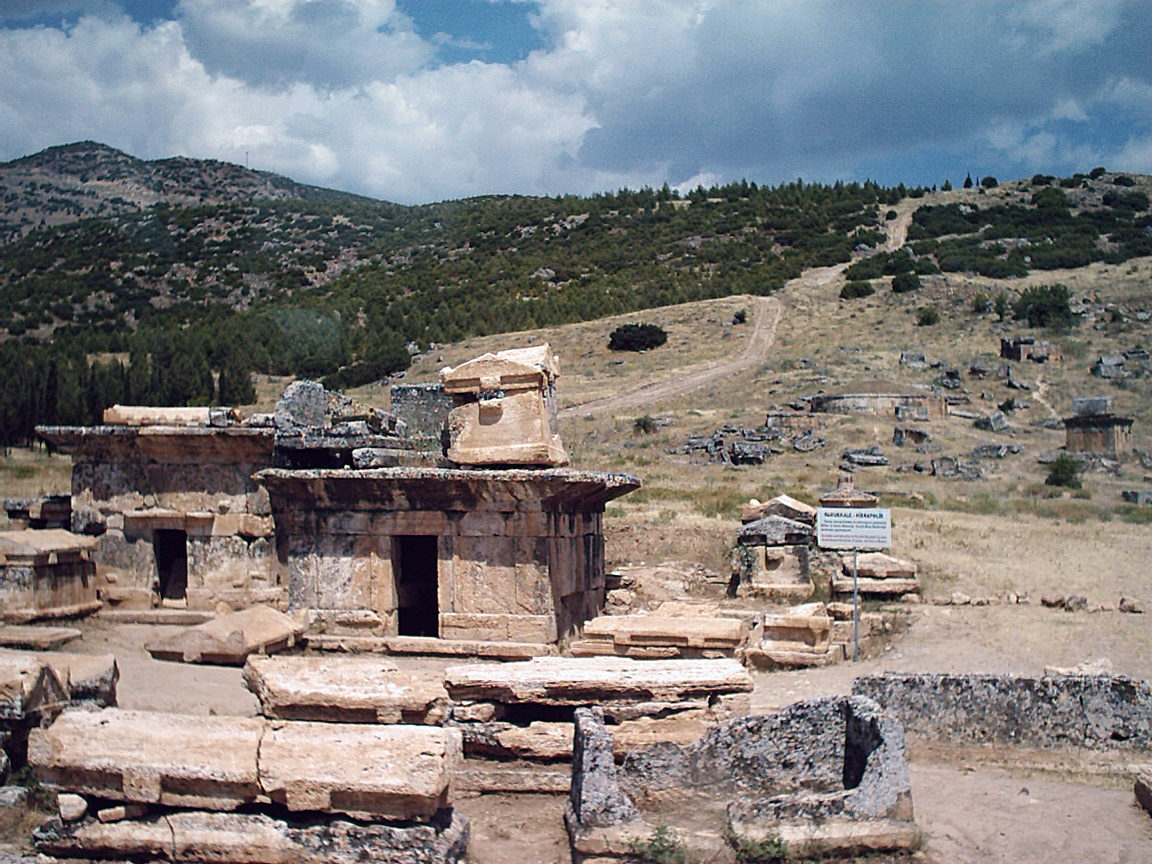
Sarcophagi at Hierapolis.

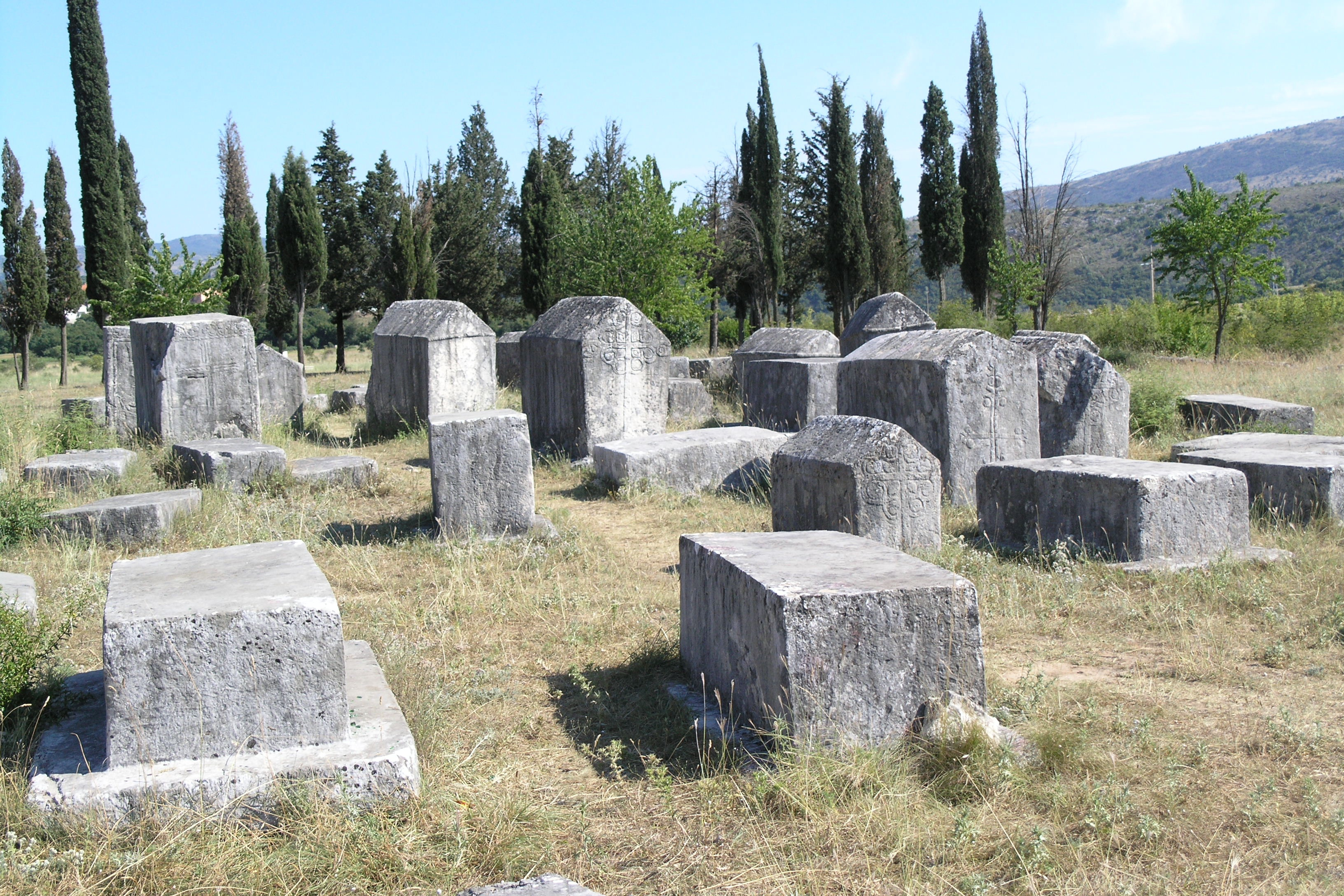
Necropolis with stećci at Radimlja.

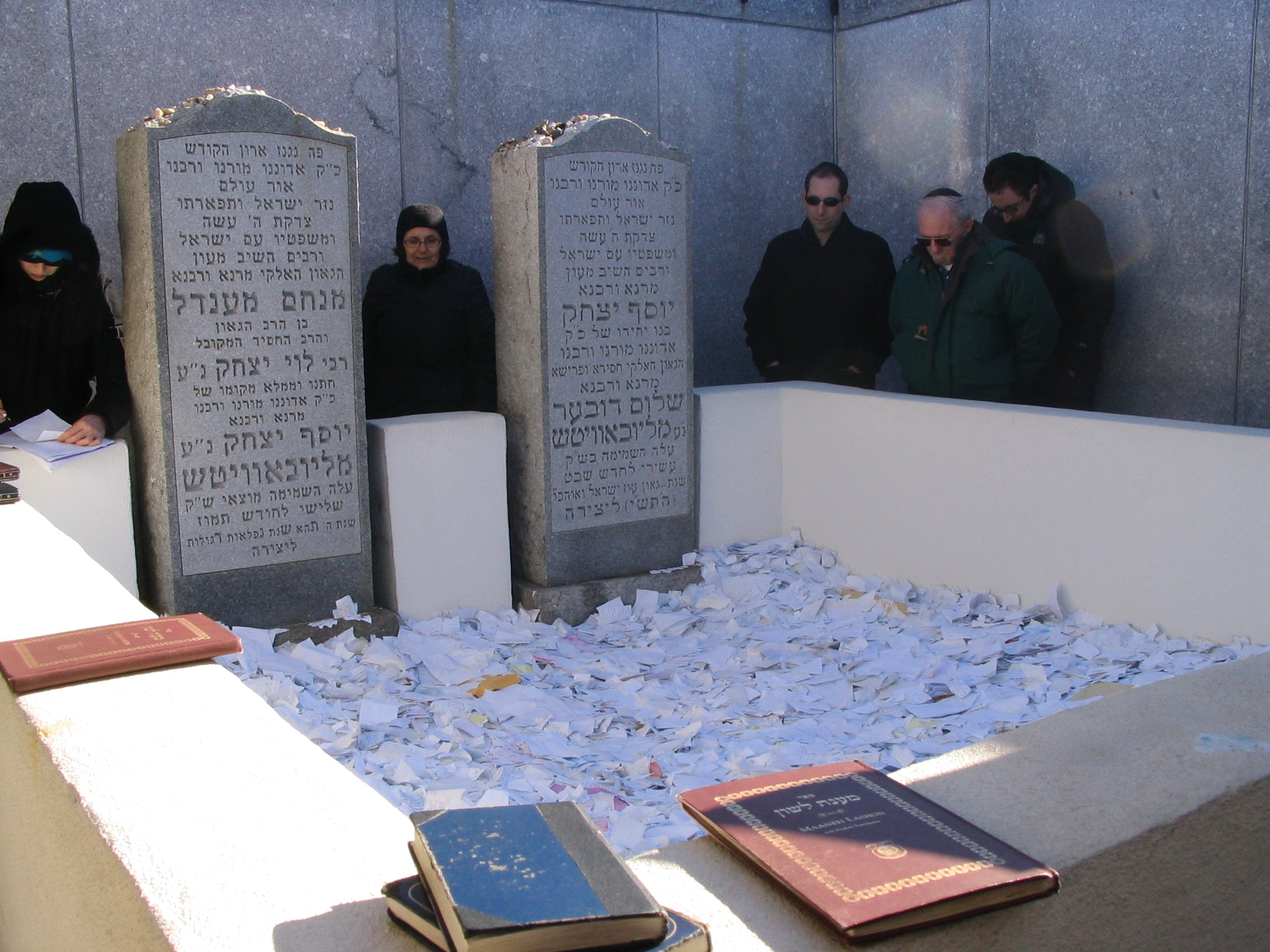
The Ohel, a Jewish pilgrimage site.

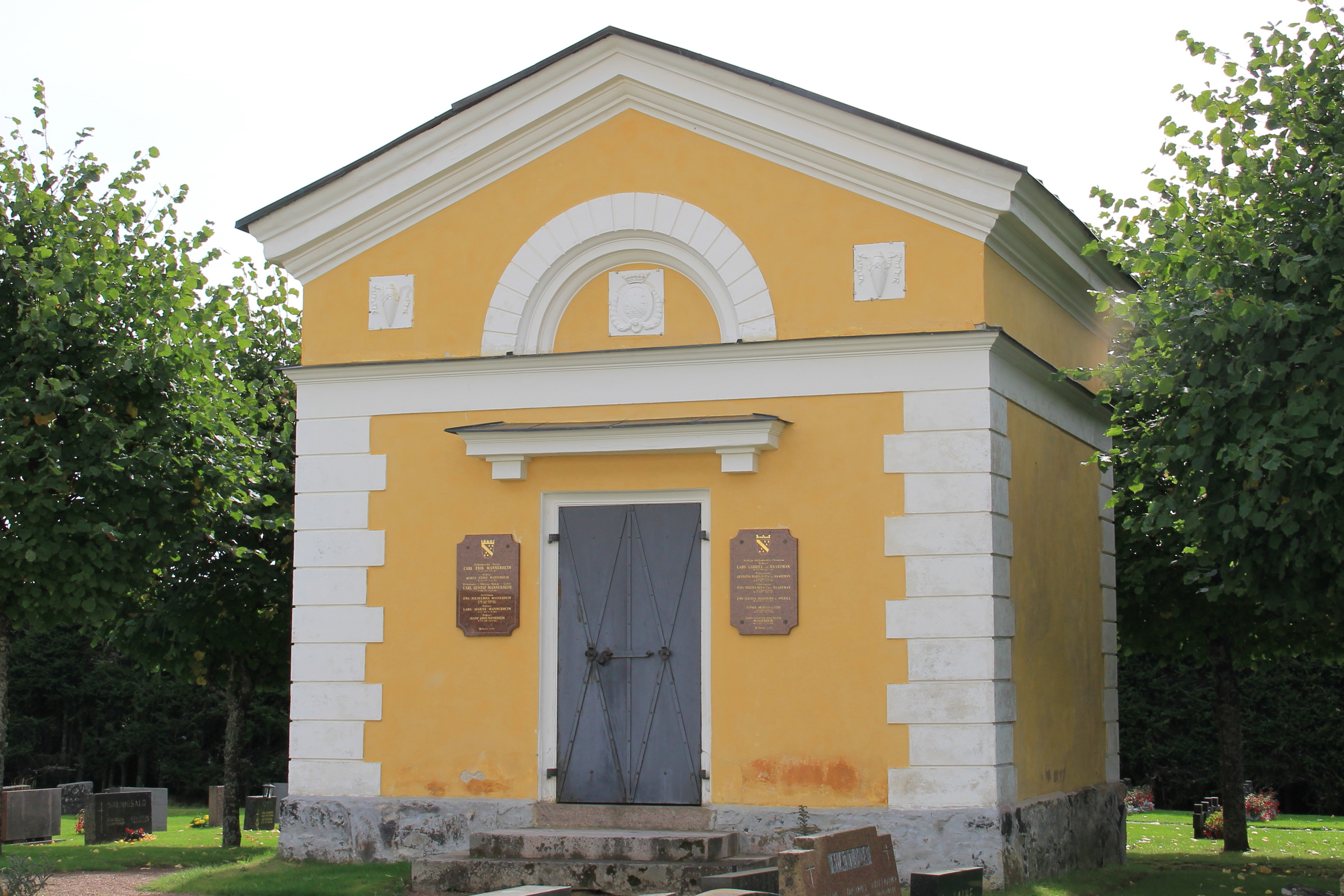
Tomb of the Mannerheim family in Askainen, Finland.

== See also ==
- List of mausolea
- List of necropoleis
- List of tombs and mausoleums
- Cemetery
- Columbarium
- Grave
- Morgue
- Cadaver monument
