= Mausoleum O. G. Khouw =

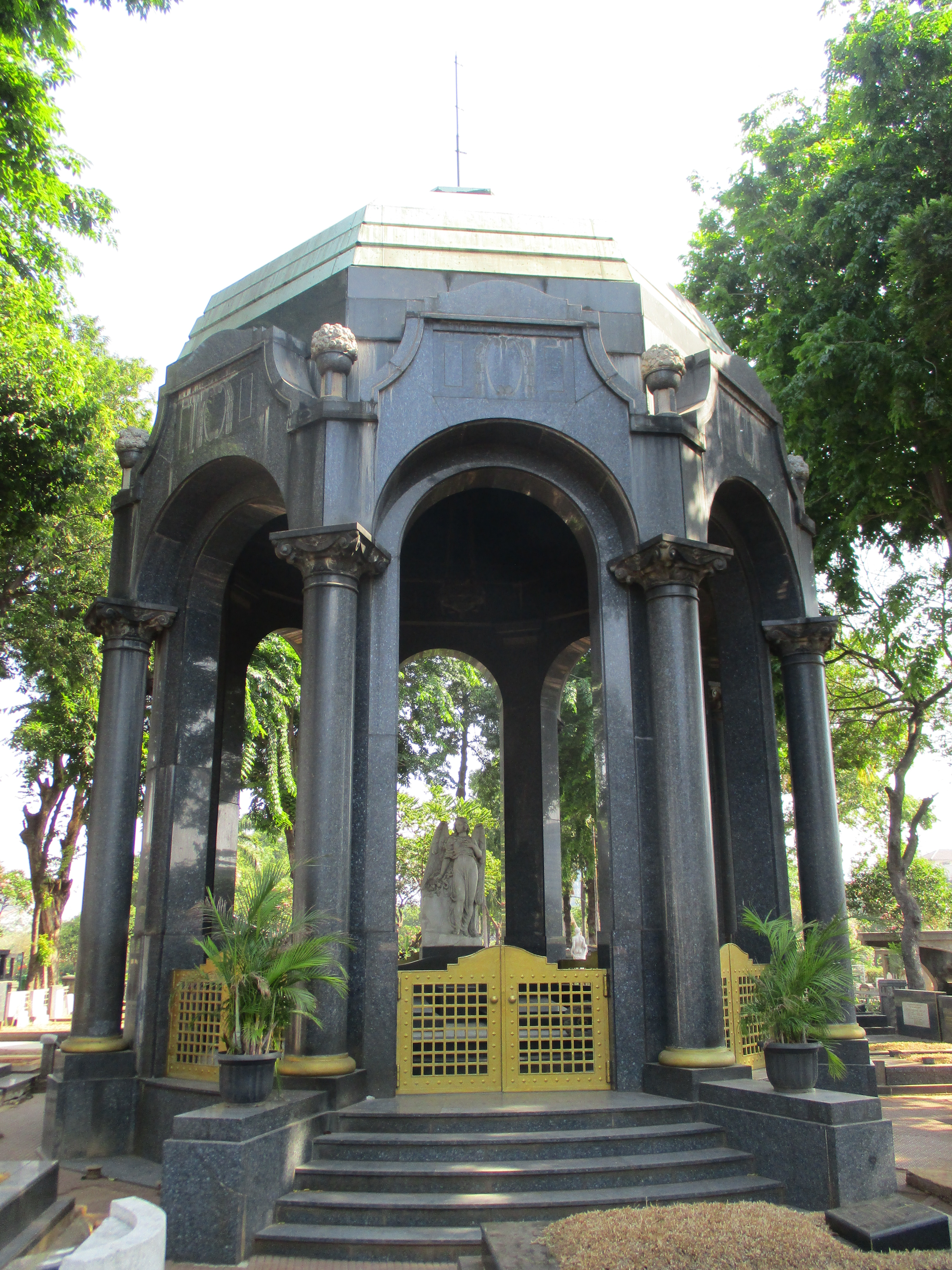
- O.G Khouw Mausoleum, inside the Petamburan Public Cemetery
- Alternative names: Mausoleum Familie O. G. Khouw, Mausoleum Oen Giok Khouw

General information
- Type: Mausoleum
- Architectural style: Art Deco
- Location: Jakarta, Indonesia, TPU Petamburan, Central Jakarta, Jakarta, Indonesia
- Estimated completion: 1927

Design and construction
- Architect: G. Racina
- Developer: Ai Marmi Italiani

The Mausoleum O. G. Khouw is a mausoleum and a historic site and tourist attraction in Jakarta, Indonesia. It is the final resting place of Oen Giok Khouw (1874–1927), a prominent philanthropist and scion of the Khouw family of Tamboen at the turn of the century. His widow, Lim Sha Nio (1879–1957), was also later interred there. Today, the mausoleum is located inside the Petamburan Public Cemetery complex.

The Mausoleum of O.G. Khouw is a representative of an architectural style rarely found in Indonesia, especially the city of Jakarta. The Mausoleum is also considered the grandest mausoleum in Southeast Asia.

== History ==
=== Background ===
Khouw Oen GIok Sia (Born: Batavia, 13 March 1874 - Died: Ragaz, Switzerland, 1 June 1927), or better known as Oen Giok Khouw or O. G. Khouw, was a Dutch citizen and a landlord and philanthropist of Chinese Peranakan descent.

As a form of respect for his generosity, the idea to build a Mausoleum; a majestic tomb monument, was emerged from his wife, Lim Sha Nio.

=== Cost and Inauguration ===
The mausoleum was designed in the Art Deco style by Giuseppe Racina, an Italian architect and contractor living in nineteenth-century Surabaya, Dutch East Indies. The tomb also has a crypt which has a relief of O.G. Khouw and his widow, Lim Sha Nio. His company, Ai Marmi Italiani, also constructed the mausoleum. When the mausoleum was completed and inaugurated on September 4, 1932, its astronomical cost from f 500,000 (around US$250,000 at the time; or US$4.5 million in today's money) to f 2.000.000 (or IDR 3 billion), which caused a sensation among the press of colonial Indonesia and the Netherlands. One commentator noted that Khouw's mausoleum was considerably more expensive than the burial memorial of American billionaire, William Rockefeller Jr. (1841 – 1922), in Sleepy Hollow, New York.

The inauguration of the Mausoleum was attended by 4000 people, including council members from the Volksraad and consular representatives. In addition, the citizens of the city of Batavia also flocked to visit the mausoleum because it was opened to the public from September 5 - October 2, 1932. The visiting time at that time was from 08:00-11:30.

=== Current condition ===
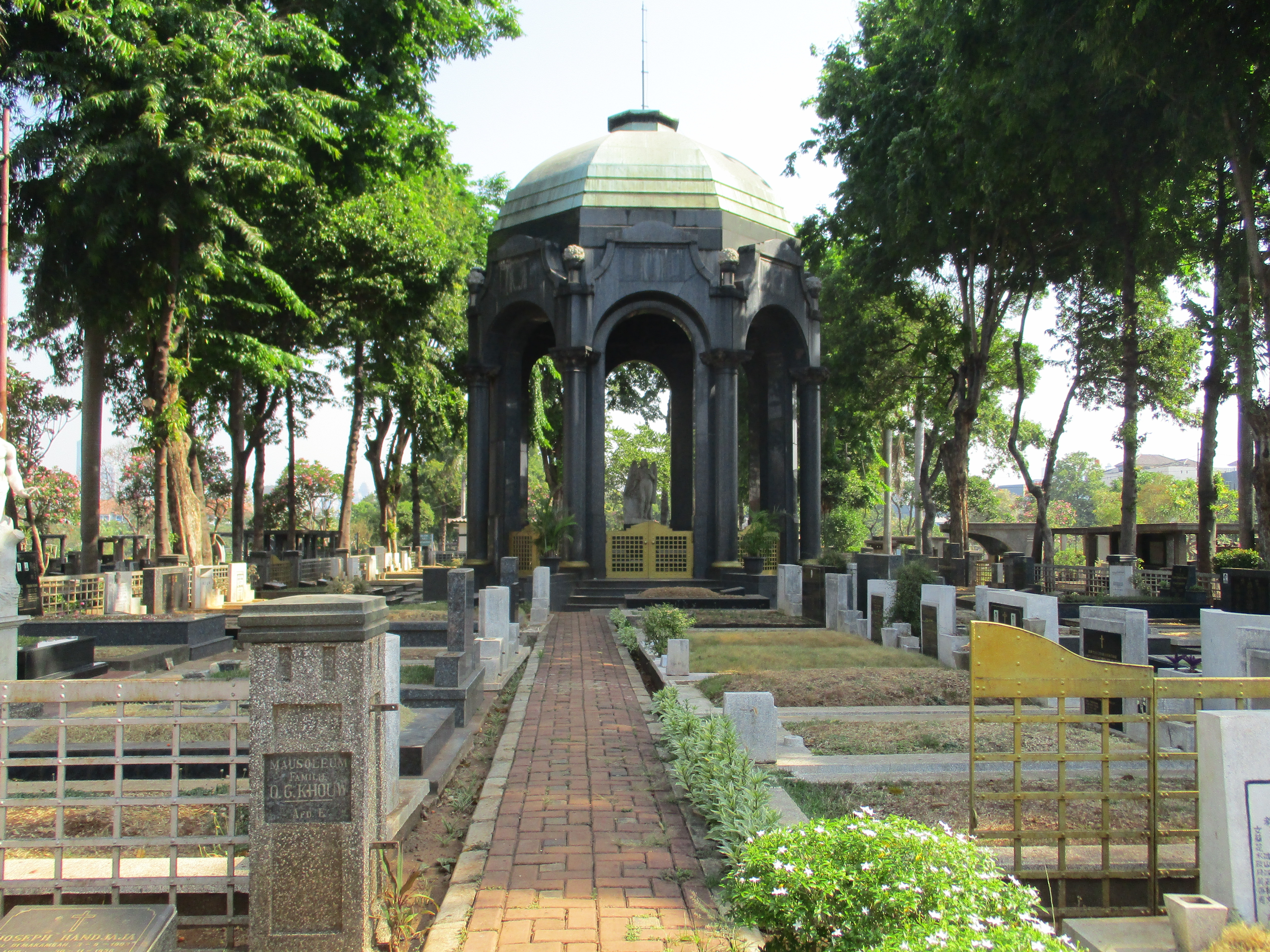
The front view of the mausoleum seen from afar.

After decades of neglect, the mausoleum attracted the attention of heritage lovers in Jakarta in recent years, who now maintain the site in good order. This mausoleum is also the center of attention for visitors and pilgrims to the Petamburan TPU because it is located near the entrance of the Petamburan Public Cemetery.

According to a survey conducted by the Jakarta Provincial Government Cultural Heritage Expert Team, the tombs around the mausoleum began to appear from the 1970s to 2022.

== Architecture ==
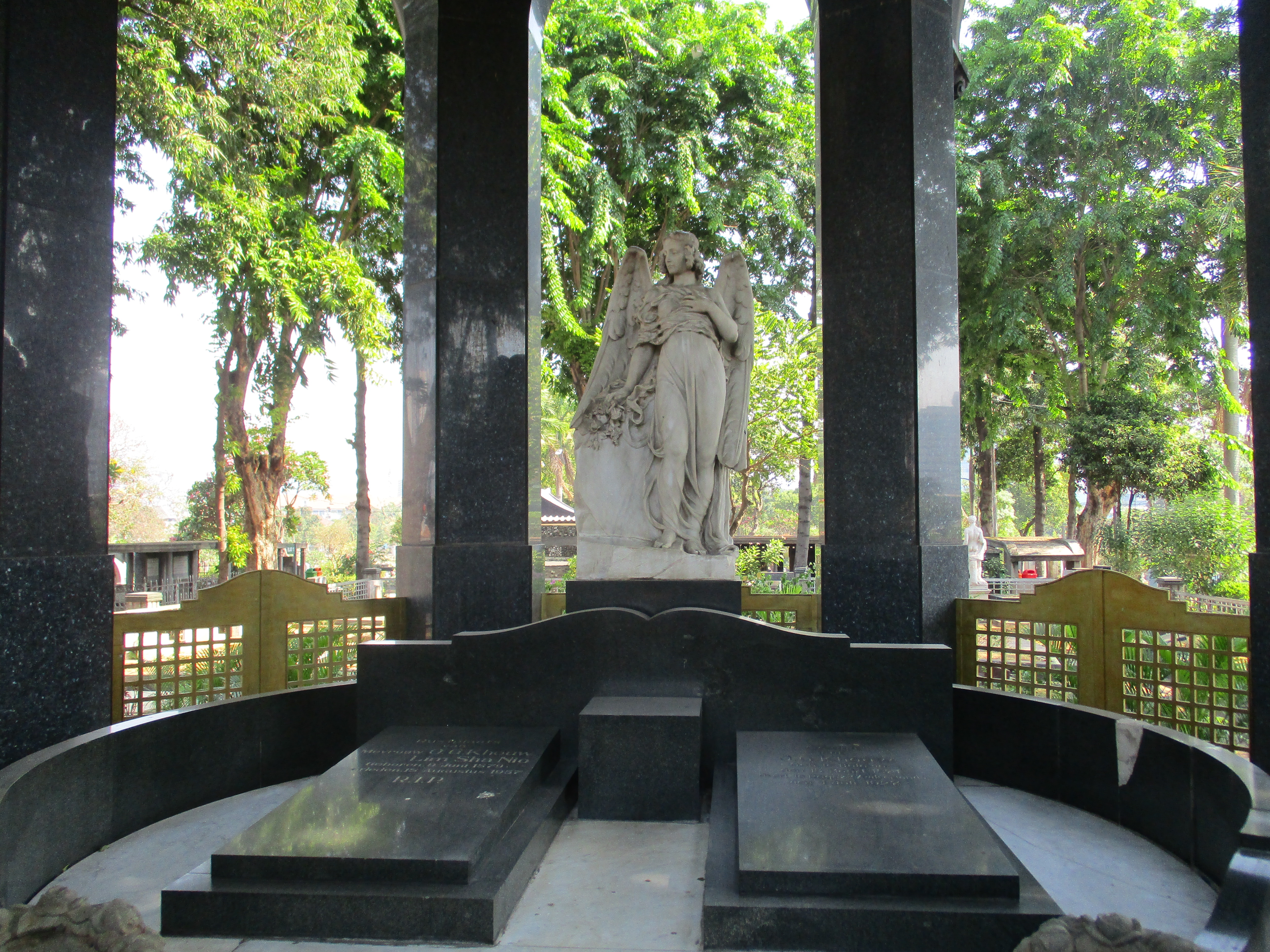
The tomb and the tombstone of O.G. Khouw and his wife, Lim Sha Nio.

Mausoleum O.G. Khouw has an Art Deco architectural style designed by the Italian architect, Giussepe Racina who once lived in Surabaya in the early 20th century. This mausoleum has a shape like a black dome, which is made of granite. In addition, there are sculptures made of large blocks of marble imported directly from Italy.

Formerly, this Mausoleum had a teak wood door with a brass handle which protected access to the tomb. However, due to the time and vandalism, the door was eventually removed and replaced by iron bars. Entering the Mausoleum, a small circular room with minimal lighting with marble walls can be seen. On one side is the marble face of O.G Khouw and his wife Lim Sha Nio. Unfortunately, the couple had no children, so there is no one to maintain the continuity of this Mausoleum.

== Other facts ==
Lim Sha Nio (widow of O.G. Khouw) died 20 years after her husband's death (in 1957 to be exact). However, the tombstone and relief of Lim Sha Nio's face in the basement of the mausoleum had already been prepared.
