= List of papal tombs =

List of papal tombs may refer to:

- List of extant papal tombs
- List of non-extant papal tombs
