= Nizami Mausoleum =

Memorial to poet Nizami Ganjavi in Azerbaijan

Coordinates: 40°41′02″N 46°25′58″E

- Nizami Məqbərəsi
- Mausoleum in 2026
- Interactive map of Nizami Mausoleum
- Location: Ganja, Azerbaijan
- Type: Mausoleum
- Completion date: 1991
- Dedicated to: Nizami Ganjavi

The Nizami Mausoleum (Azerbaijani: Nizami məqbərəsi), built in honor of the 12th-century Persian poet Nizami Ganjavi, stands just outside the city of Ganja, Azerbaijan. The mausoleum was originally built in 1947 in place of an old collapsed mausoleum, and rebuilt in its present form in 1991.

== History ==
The tomb of Nizami has been a place of devoted pilgrimage for many centuries. According to historian Vasily Bartold, the mausoleum was first mentioned in historical chronicles in 1606. The Safavid court chronicler Iskander Beg Munshi reported that toward the end of February 1606, Shah Abbas I reached Ganja and camped near the tomb of Sheikh Nizami, where on 24 March he celebrated the holiday of Novruz.

During the Russo-Persian War in 1826, a decisive battle between Russian and Persian forces took place near the tomb of Nizami. The Russian forces commanded by General Ivan Paskevich defeated the Persian army and forced it to retreat. Russian envoy to Persia, Aleksandr Griboyedov, recorded in his diary a conversation with writer and historian Abbasgulu Bakikhanov, a member of the Russian diplomatic mission, in which Bakikhanov informed him that the Battle of Elisabethpol had occurred in the vicinity of the tomb of Nizami.

=== Collapse ===
According to Bakikhanov, by the 1840s the tomb of Nizami had collapsed, and former vezir of Karabakh khanate Mirza Adigozal bey was rebuilding it.

In 1873 Shah of Persia Naser al-Din Qajar, on the way home from his first tour in Europe, passed by the tomb of Nizami. He mentioned in his diary the tomb of Shaykh Nizami by the side of the road at about half a league or more from Ganja, and described it as "a very wretched brick building".

By the turn of the 20th century, the mausoleum became almost completely ruined. In 1925, the grave of the poet was excavated, and his remains exhumed for reburial at the center of Ganja. However, the leadership of Soviet Azerbaijan ordered the reburial of the poet at the same location and the erection of a temporary monument.

In 1940, in connection with construction of a new mausoleum, an archaeological investigation revealed the remains of an ancient mausoleum deep under the ground, dating to the 13th century. The remains of an overground structure were a 19th-century restoration.

=== Reconstruction ===
In 1947, a new mausoleum, designed by A. Sarkisov and I. Vakhutin, was constructed from limestone. Later, the Soviet government constructed an aluminium production plant in the vicinity of the mausoleum. The hazardous emissions from the plant seriously damaged the building, and it collapsed by the late 1980s.

The mausoleum was rebuilt in its present form after Republic of Azerbaijan gained its independence following the fall of the Soviet Union in 1991.

== Building ==
It is a tall cylindrical building surrounded by gardens. On one side, there are metal statues commemorating Nizami's epic poems. The mausoleum was constructed from solid granite blocks, delivered from Ukraine. The architect was Farman Imamguliyev, and the statues were created by the sculptor Gorkhmaz Sujaddinov.

== Gallery ==
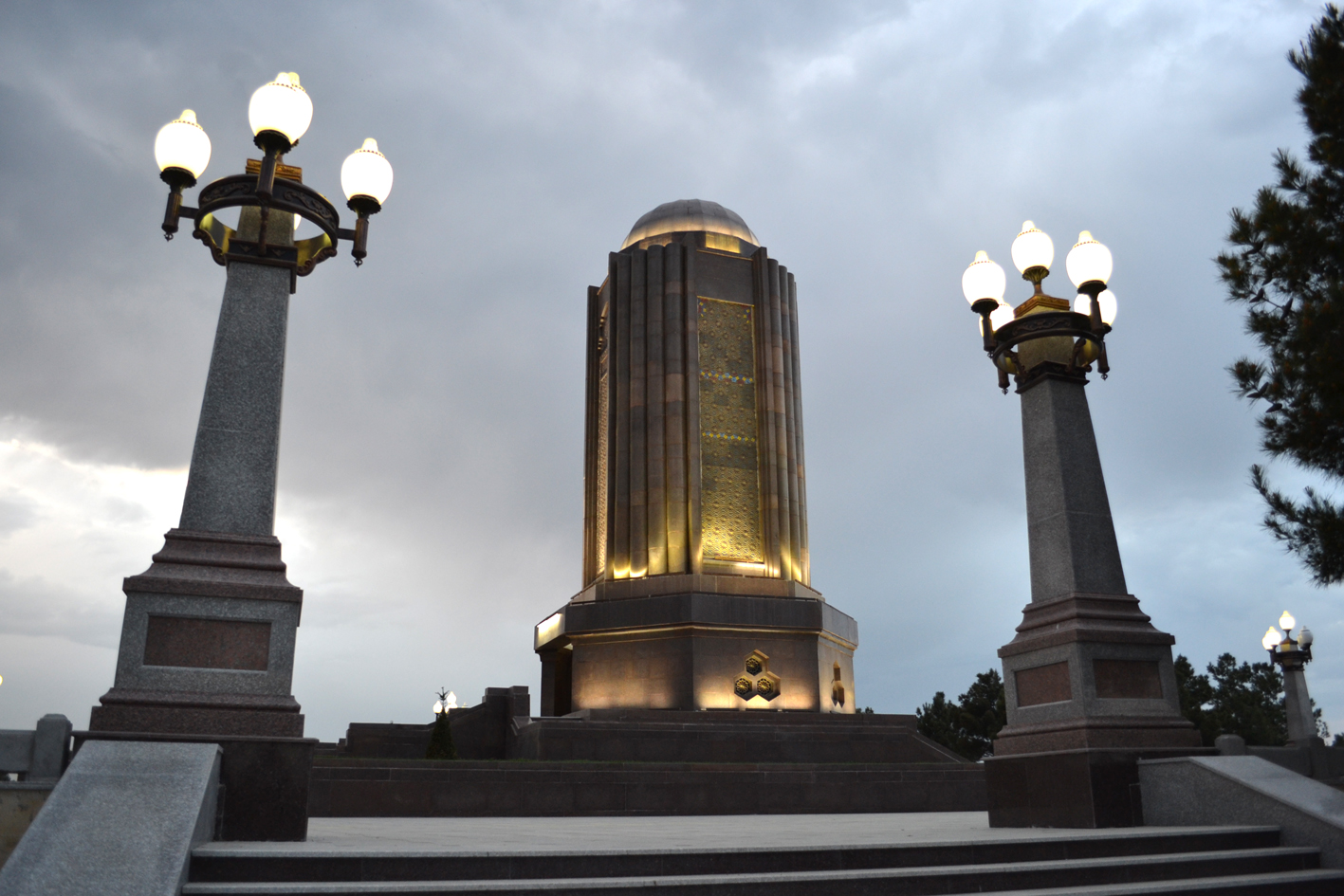

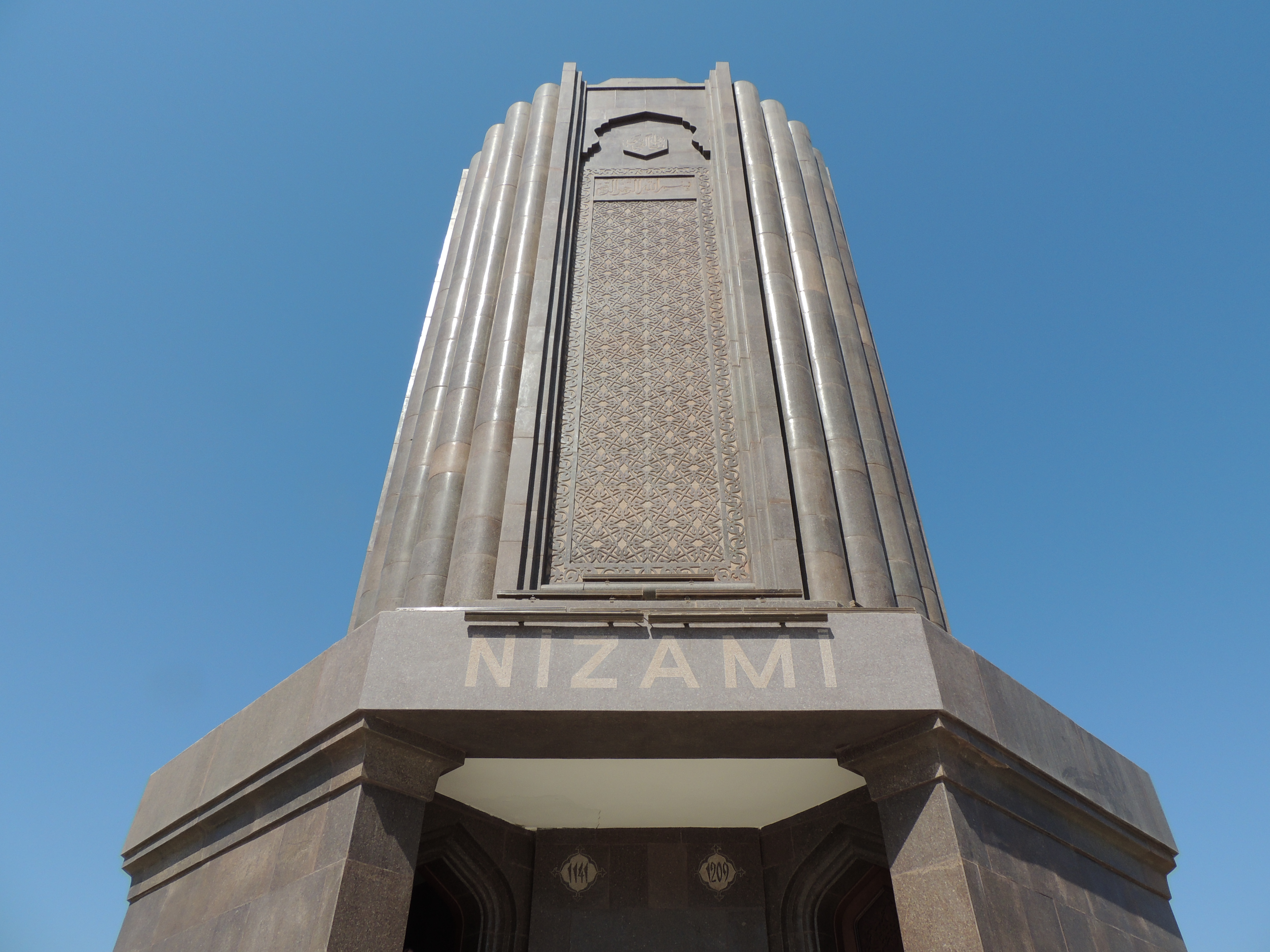

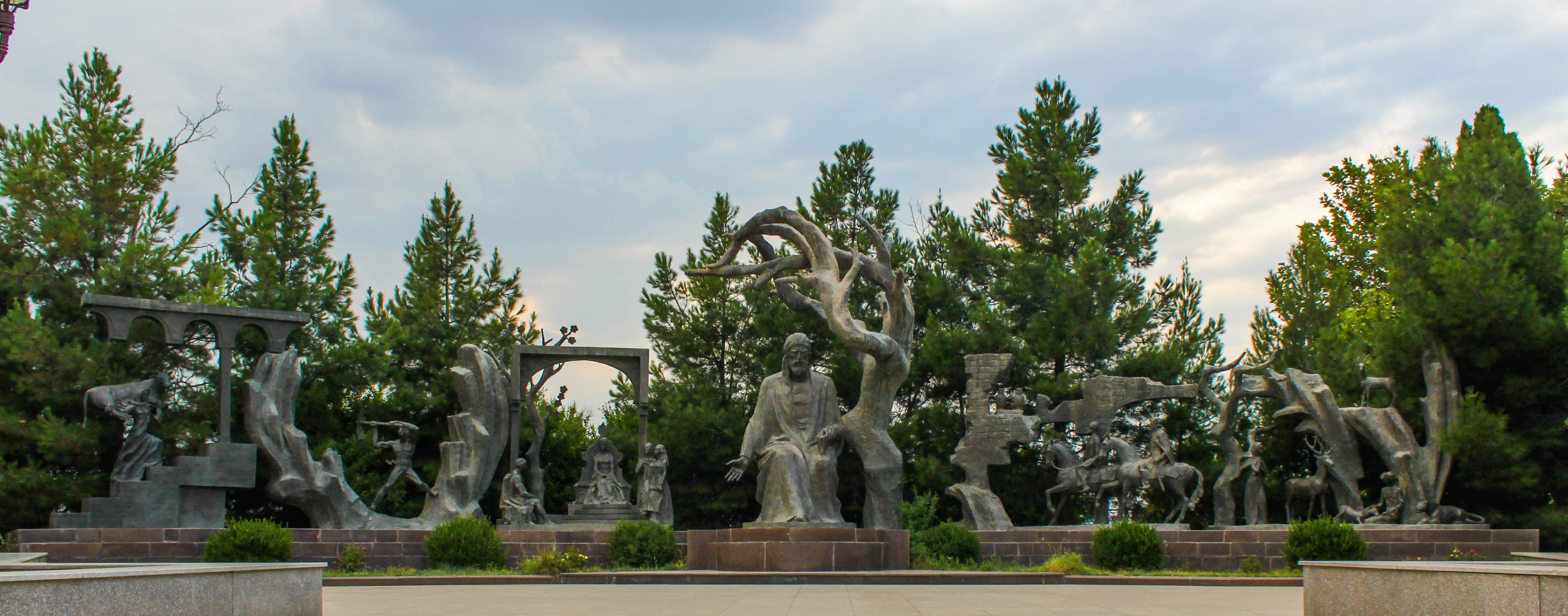

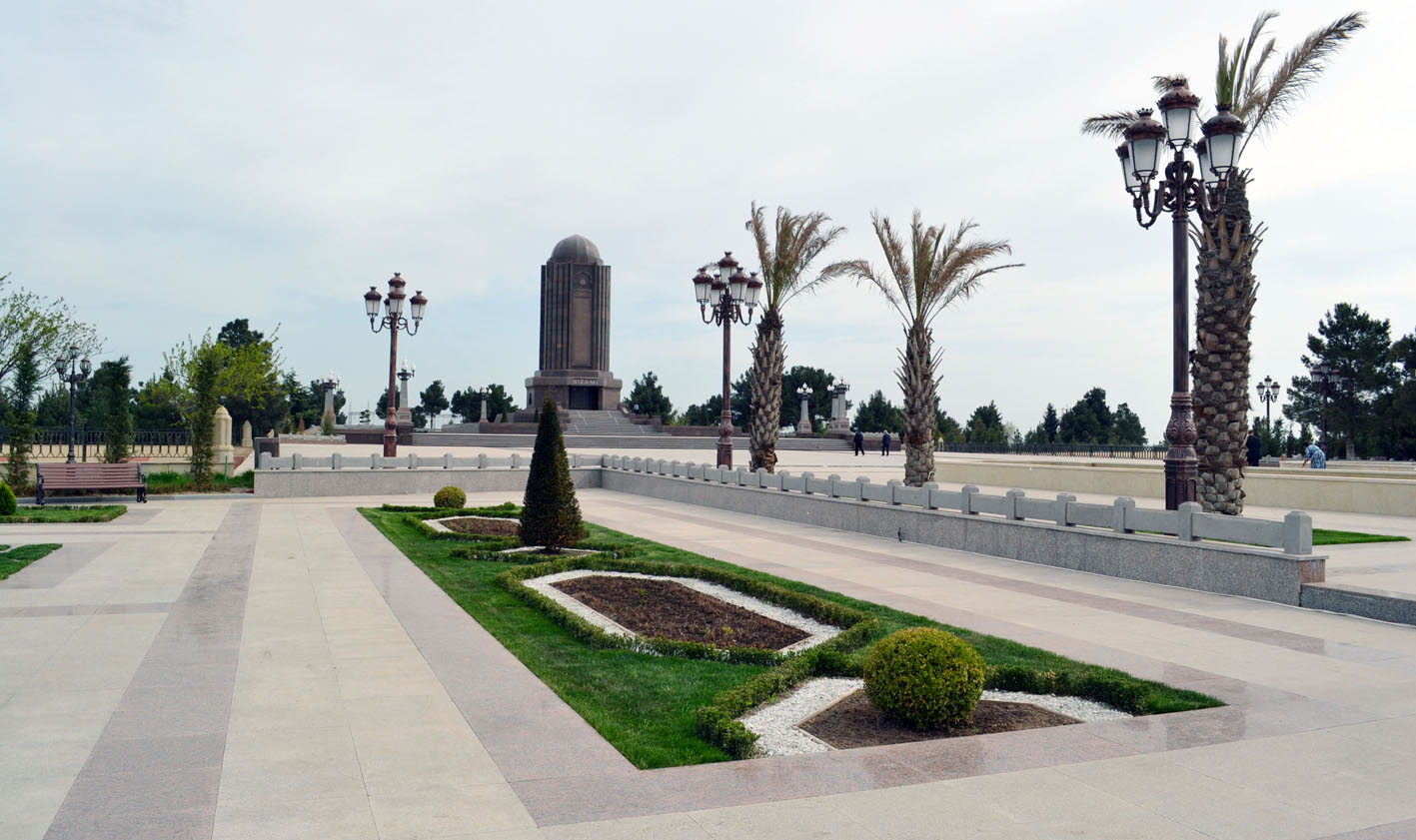

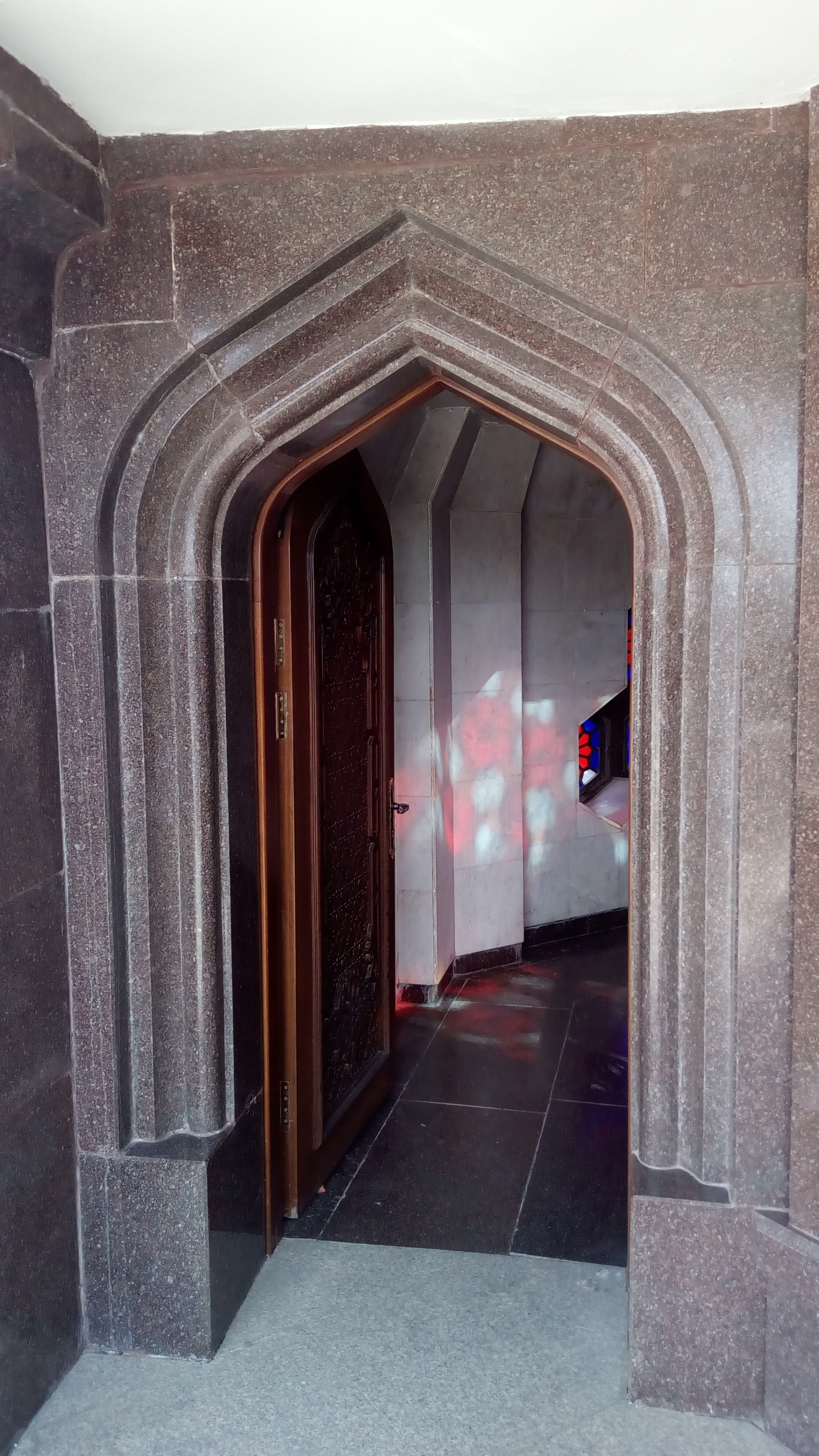

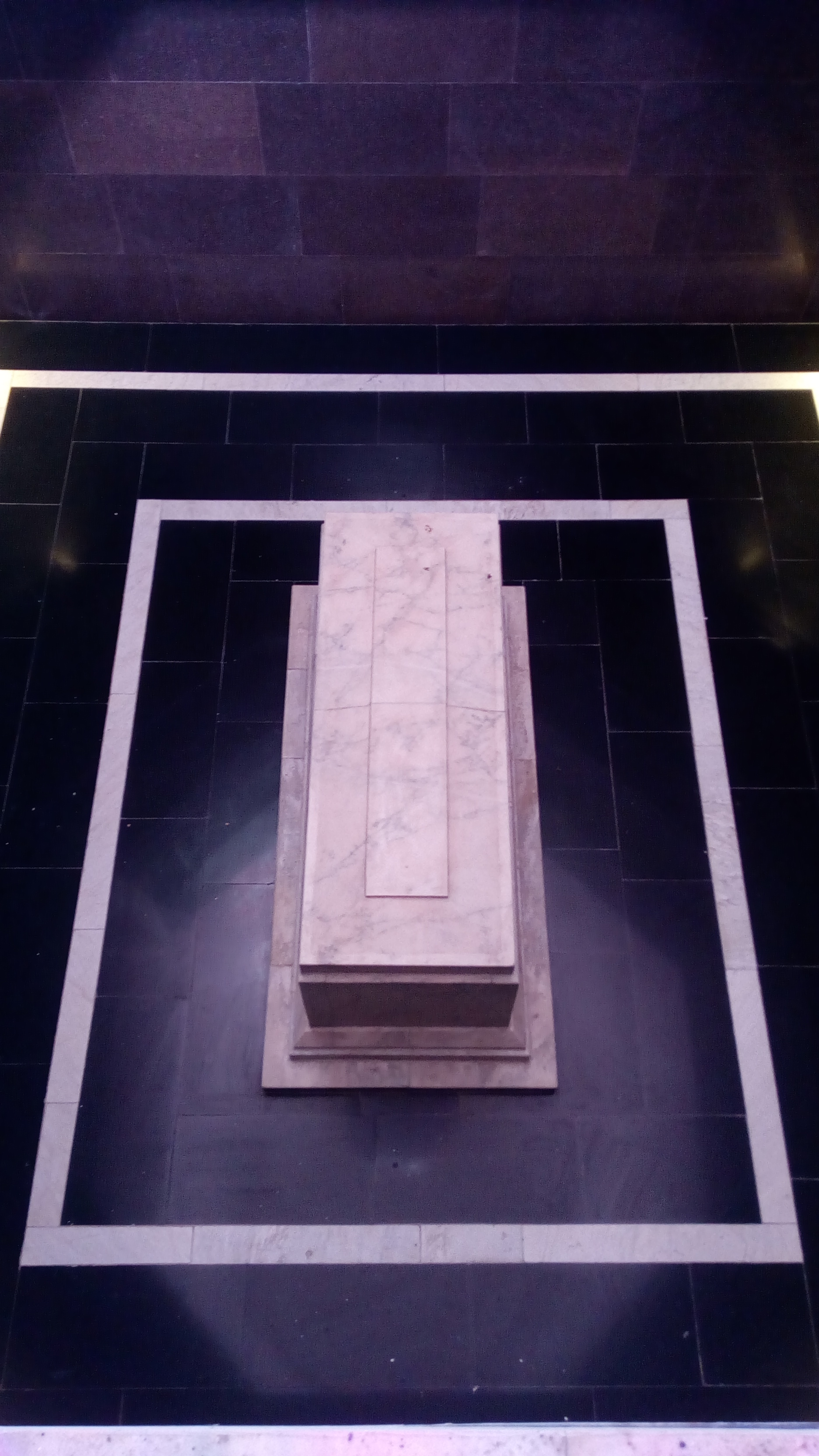

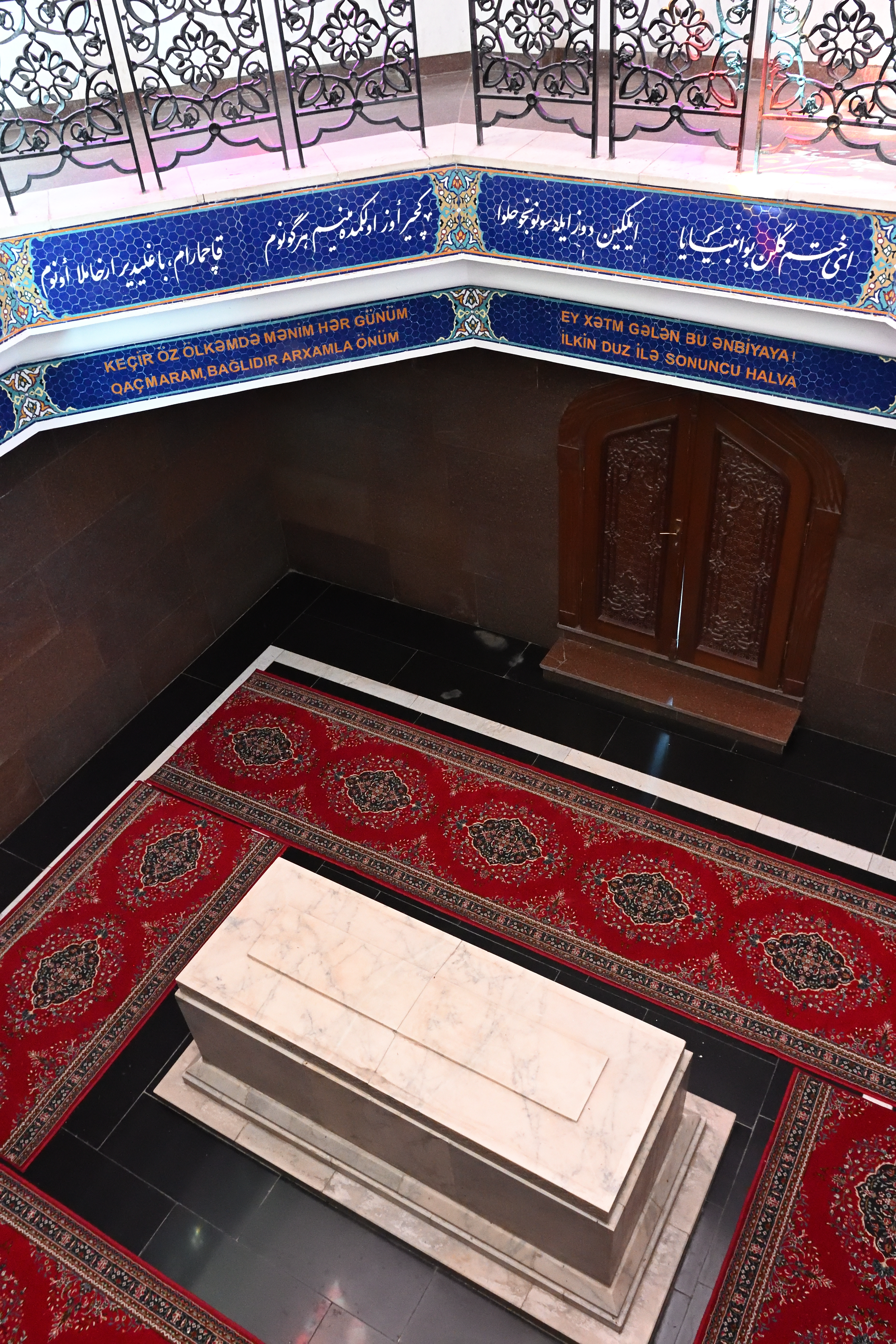

== See also ==
- List of mausoleums
