= Shrine of Shah Jamal =

Tomb of Sufi saint in Lahore, Pakistan

Coordinates: 31.52822°N 74.32900°E

Tomb of Shah Jamal
- شاه جمال درگاه
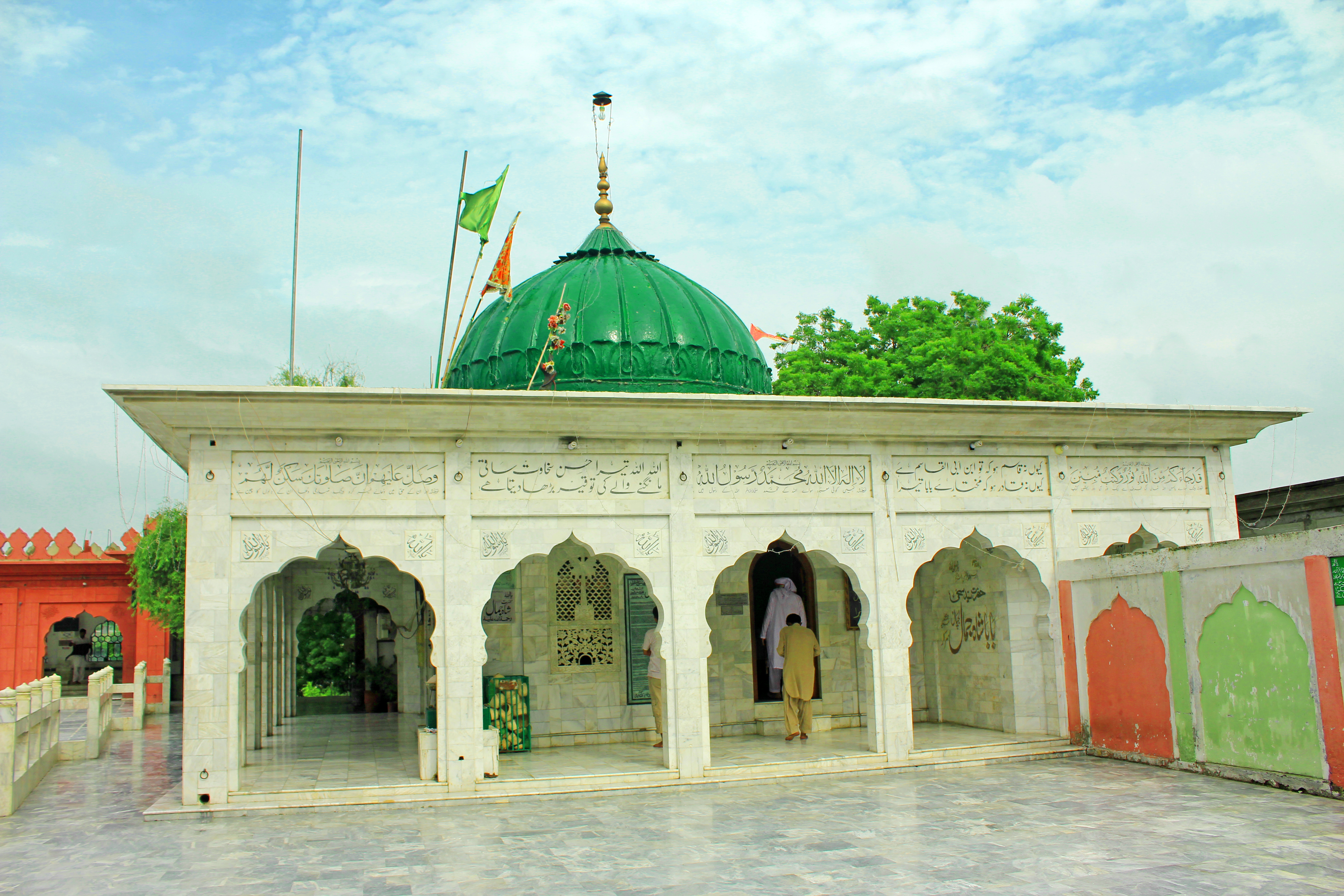
- The Tomb of Baba Shah Jamal is one of Lahore's most popular Sufi shrines

Religion
- Affiliation: Islam
- Province: Punjab

Location
- Location: Lahore
- Country: Pakistan
- Interactive map of Tomb of Shah Jamal

Architecture
- Type: Mosque and Sufi mausoleum
- Style: Modern

Specifications
- Dome: 1
- Minaret: 4

The Tomb of Shah Jamal (Urdu: شاه جمال درگاه) is the tomb of Sufi Saint Baba Shah Jamal. It is located in Lahore, Punjab, Pakistan. It can be located opposite Forman Christian (FC) College, near Muslim Town. There is a mosque built around the tomb which incorporates a graveyard.

== Traditions ==
At the foot of the stairs leading up to the tomb, there is a regular gathering of pilgrims, who come every Thursday night and Friday morning, following a tradition that has been going on for hundreds of years. Dhol is played with devotees (dervish or fakir) dancing in a trance also known as dhamaal. The drummer Pappu Sain was the central attraction and performed on the dhol.

This performance, every Thursday night/ Friday morning, is attended by people from all walks of life—students, government officials, musicians both domestic and international, models, common folk. It is encouraged that people wear simple, plain clothes and come covered, out of respect for the shrine.

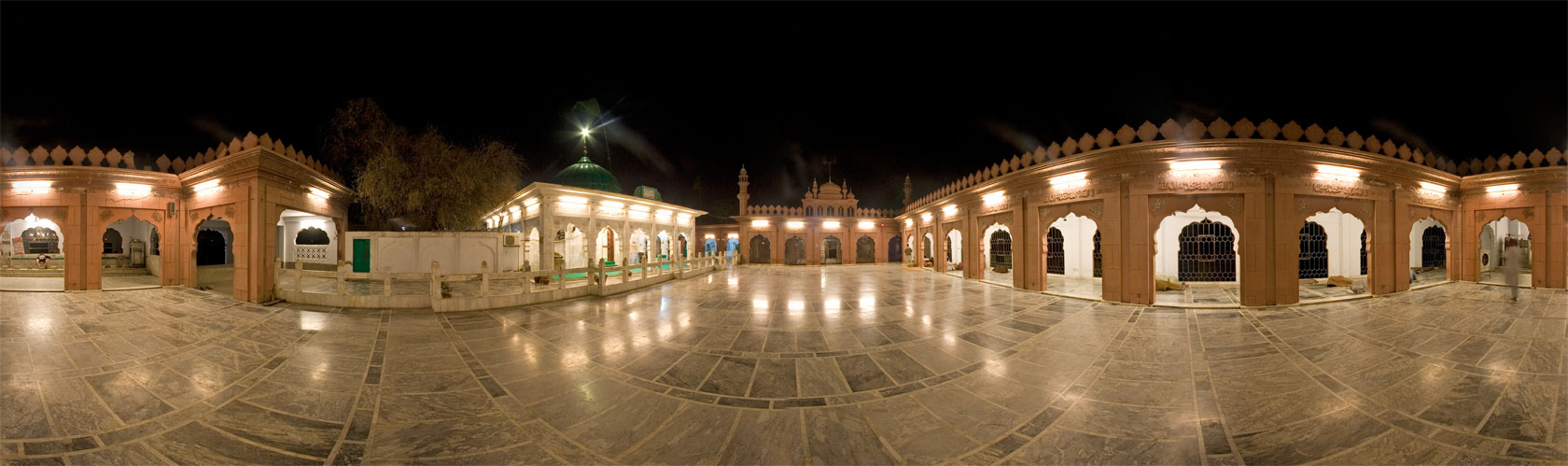
The shrine complex at night.

== Annual urs festival ==
The annual urs festival is conducted every year on the 3rd, 4th and 5th days of the Islamic month of Rabi' al-Thani. In 2006, 300,000 people attended the 366th annual URS (anniversary celebrations) of Shah Jamal (1588-1649). The present custodian (Sajjada Nasheen) is Dr Pir Syed Ali Hussain Shah Naqvi.

== Gallery ==
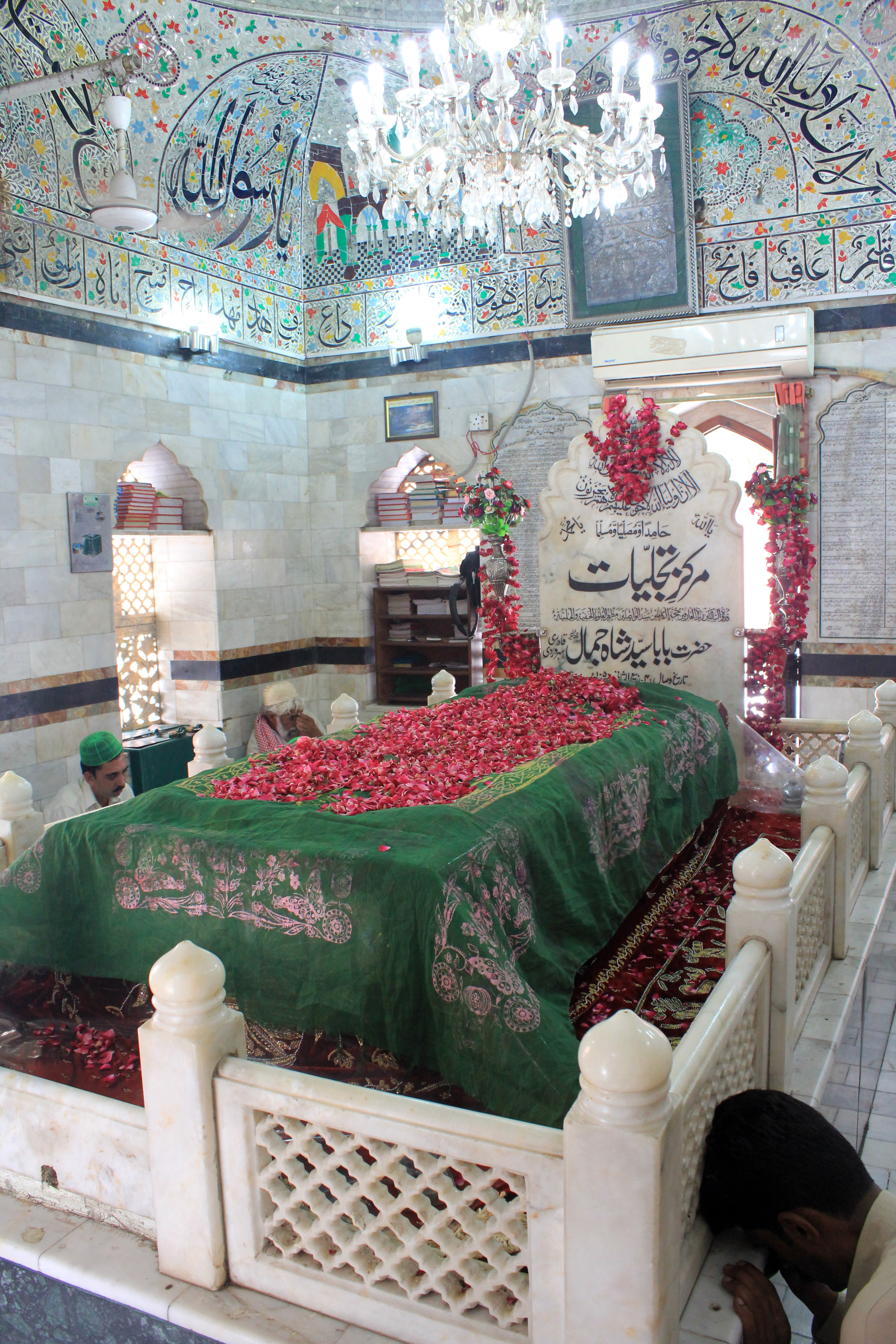
The grave of Baba Shah Jamal

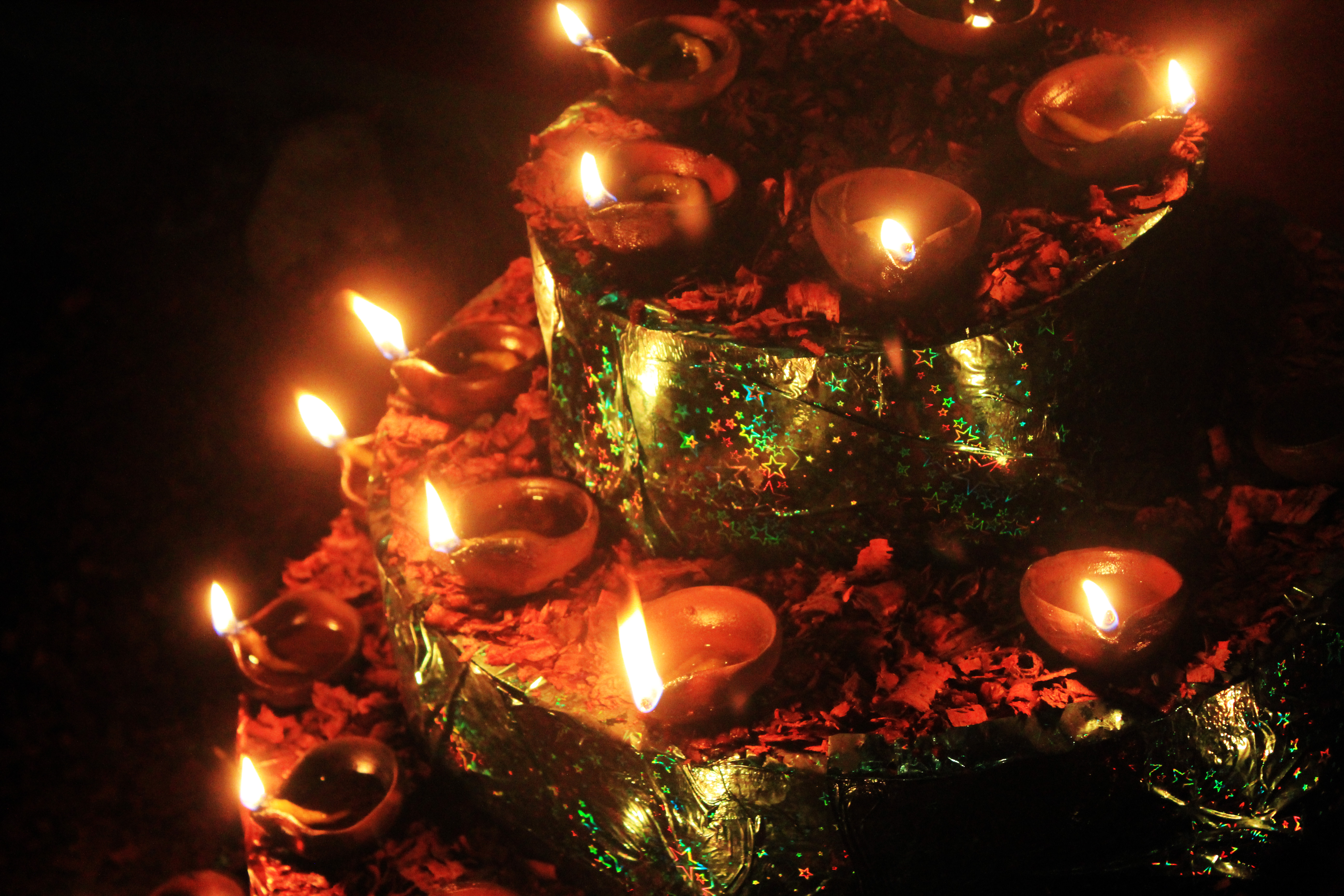
Oil lamps are burnt during the annual urs festival

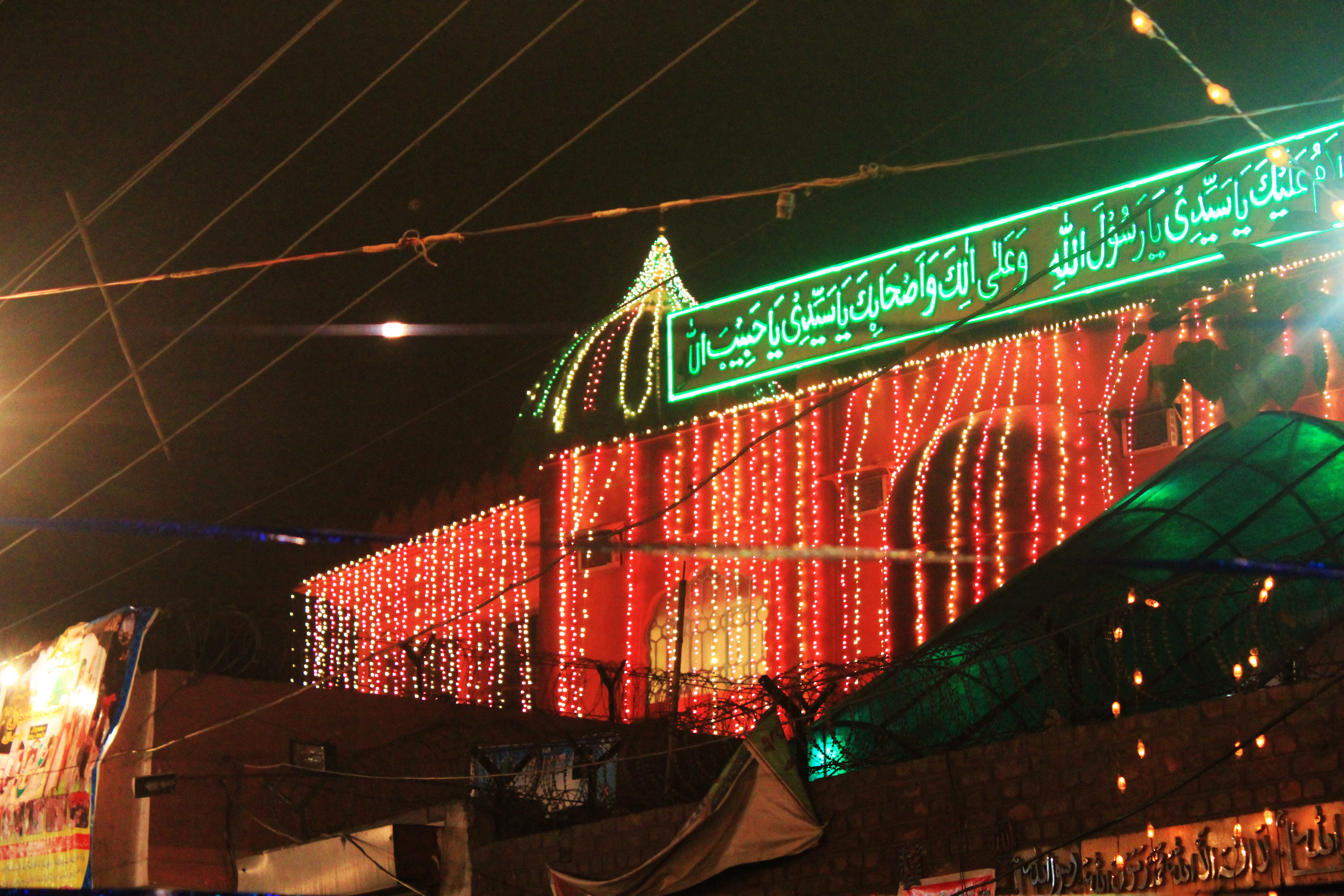
The shrine is decorated for the annual urs festival

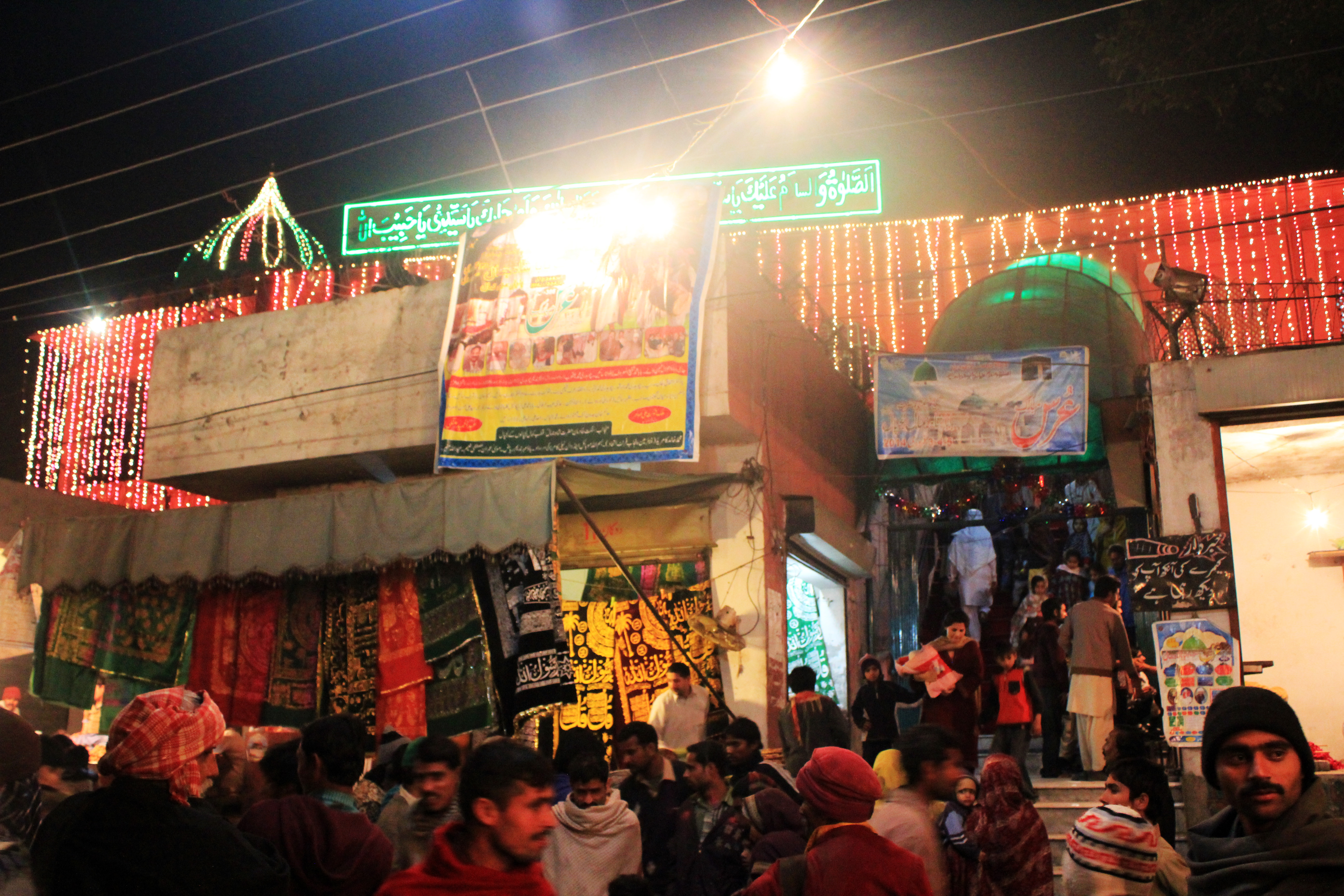

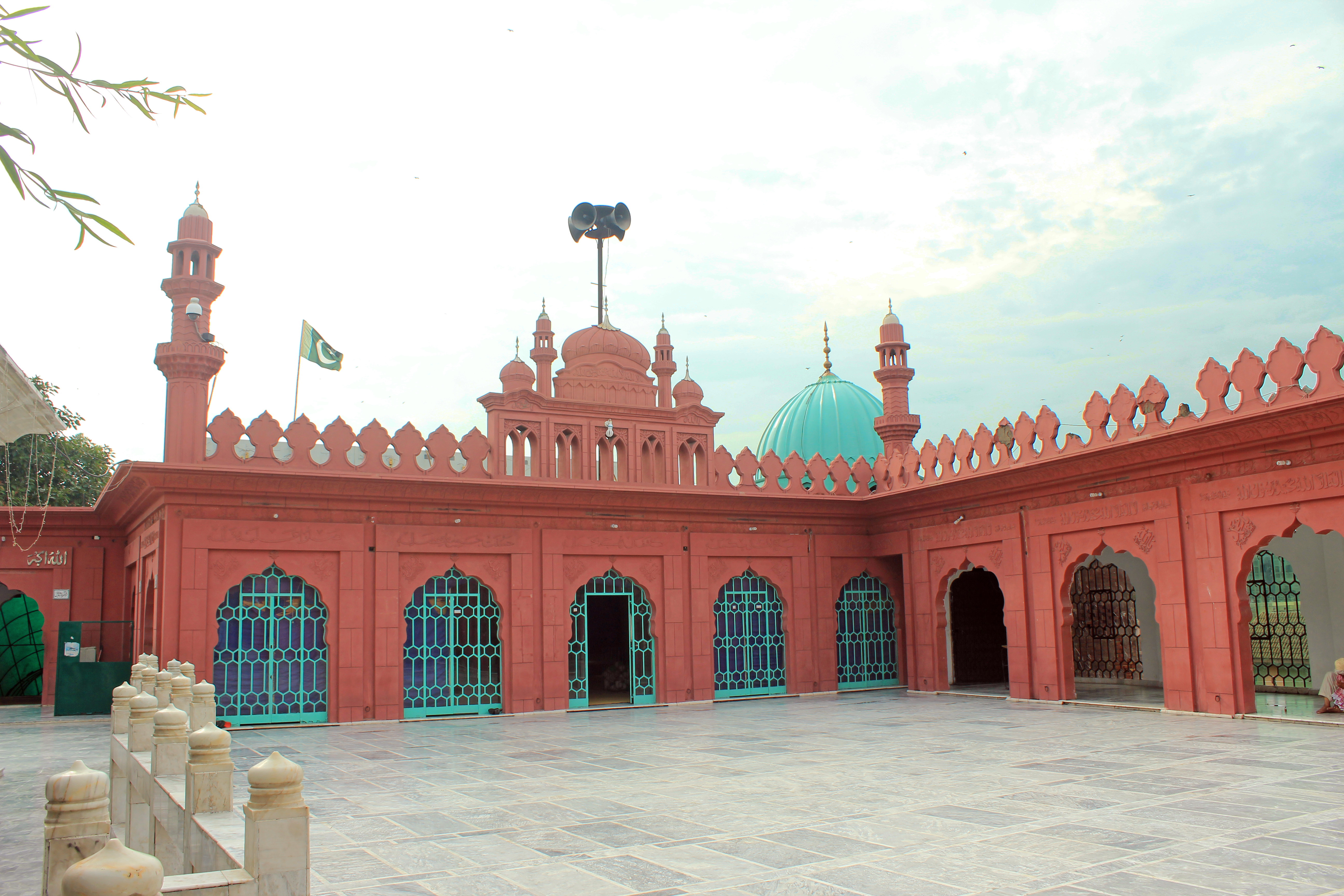
The shrine complex includes a small mosque

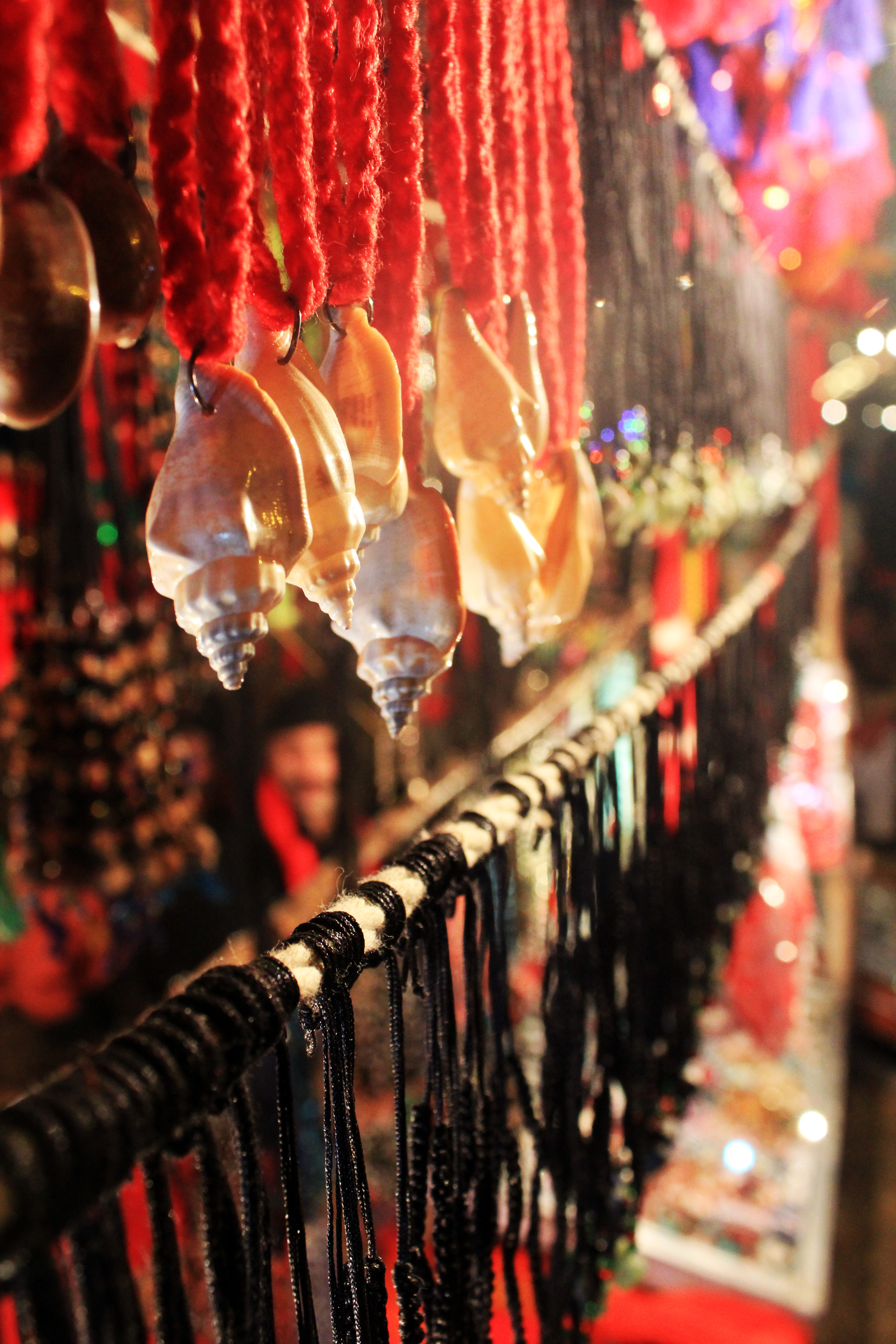
Amulets at the shrine

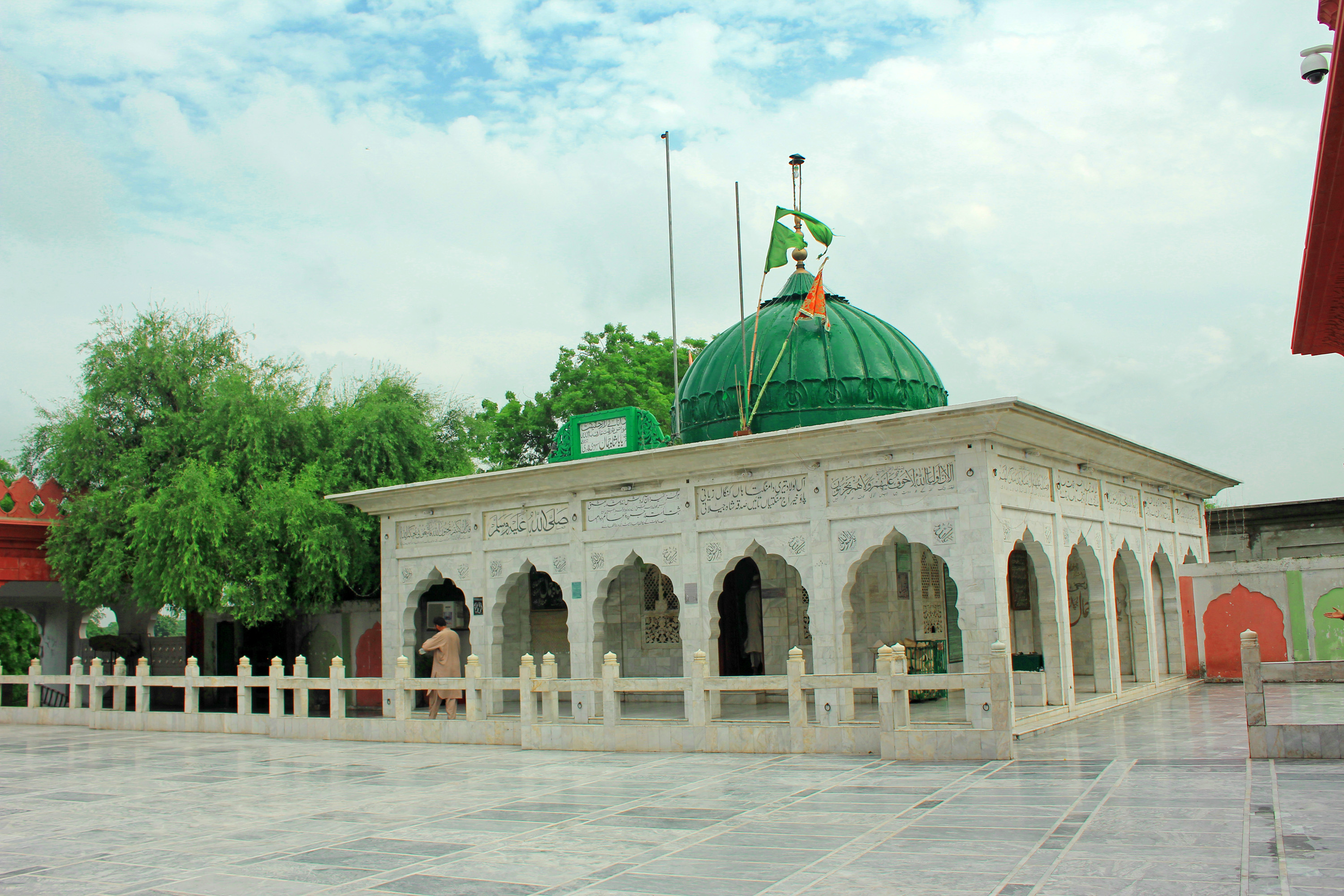
Compound of Shah Jamal Shrine which is part of the mosque.
