= Rani =

Title for a female ruler in the Indian subcontinent

- Pronunciation: Ranī

Origin
- Origin: Sanskrit

Other names
- Alternative spelling: Ranee, Raani
- Variant forms: Maharani, Raji/Rajee

Rani (Sanskrit: राणी, romanized: Rāṇī) is a female title, equivalent to queen, for royal or princely rulers in the Indian subcontinent and Southeast Asia. It translates to 'queen' in English. It is also a Sanskrit Hindu feminine given name. The term applies equally to a queen regnant as well as a wife of a Raja/Rai or Rana

== Notable people named Rani ==
- Rani (Pakistani actress) (born December 8, 1946 – died May 27, 1993), Pakistani actress and model
- Rani Bhabani (born 1716 – died 1795), Indian philanthropist and zamindar
- Rani Chandra (born October 12, 1976), Indian actress and winner of the Miss Kerala pageant
- Rani Chatterjee (born November 3, 1984), Indian actress, dancer and presenter
- Rani Chitralekha Bhonsle (born February 26, 1941), Indian political and social worker
- Rani Gaidinliu (born January 26, 1915 – died February 17, 1993), Indian activist, spiritual and political leader
- Rani Hamid (born 1944), Bangladeshi chess player
- Rani Kamalesvaran (born 1971), an Australian singer, popular in the late 1990s
- Rani Karnaa (born 1939), Indian dancer
- Rani Khedira (born January 27, 1994), German footballer
- Rani Mukerji (born March 21, 1978), Indian actress
- Rani Mundiasti (born October 4, 1984), Indonesian badminton player
- Anita Rani Nazran (born 25 October 1977), English radio and television presenter
- Rani Price (born January 29, 1974), English television presenter
- Rani Rampal (born December 4, 1994), Indian field hockey player
- Rani Rashmoni (born 1793 – died 1861), Indian activist, businesswoman, philanthropist, zamindars and founder of the Dakshineswar Kali Temple
- Rani Sharone (born 1978), American bassist and guitarist
- Rani Shiromani, Indian Revolutionary and Tribal Queen
- Rani Taj (born October 3, 1993), British-Pakistani dhol player
- Rani Maria Vattalil (born January 29, 1954 – died February 25, 1995), Indian catholic religious, activist and missionary social worker
- Rani Vijaya Devi (born August 28, 1922 – died December 8, 2005), Indian princess and musician
- Rani Yahya (born September 12, 1984), Brazilian mixed martial artist and Brazilian jiu-jitsu practitioner

== Notable people named Ranee ==
- Ranee Brylinski (born 1957), American mathematician
- Ranee Campen, Thai-British actress
- Ranee Lee (born 1942), Canadian jazz vocalist and musician
- Ranee Narah (born 1965), Indian politician

== Notable people surnamed Rani ==
- Devika Rani (born March 30, 1908 – died March 9, 1994), Indian actress, singer and textile designer
- Krishna Rani (born 2001), Bangladeshi footballer
- Pooja Rani (born February 17, 1991), Indian boxer

== Fictional characters ==
- The Rani, from the British science-fiction television series Doctor Who.
- Rani Chandra, from 2007's British science fiction television The Sarah Jane Adventures.
- Rani, from the Disney franchise Disney Fairies.
- Rani Kapoor, from the Australian soap opera Neighbours.
- The Rani of Cooch Naheen, from Salman Rushdie's novel, Midnight's Children.
- Rani, the leader of the Night Pride and love interest of Kion in The Lion Guard.

== See also ==
- Prabhu, Sanskrit for "prince".
- Queen regnant
- Rani, Rajasthan
- Rani dialect of Polish
- Rani people, historical tribe of the island of Rügen, Germany
