= Baba Shah Jamal =

South Asian Sufi Saint (1588–1671)

Syed Shah Jamal Uddin Naqvi Bukhari (Urdu:سید شاہ جمال الدین نقوی بخاری; 1588–1671) also known as Baba Shah Jamal was a Sufi saint. He is also known as Hussaini Syed.

== Ancestry ==
Syed Shah Jamal was descendant of Makhdoom Syed Sadruddin Rajan Qattaal, who was a son of Makhdoom Syed Sultan Ahmad Kabir Bin Makhdoom Syed Jalaluddin Surkh-Posh Bukhari. Syed Shah Jamal belonged to the school of Qadriyya, Suhrawardiyya and Chishtiyya sufi orders. Baba Syed Shah Jamal's descendants mostly live in Kotli Shah Saleem, Shakargarh. His grandson Syed Shah Saleem Bin Baba Syed Shah Moosa Bin Shah Jamal's Tomb is situated in Kotli Shah Saleem village.

== Life ==
He lived in Lahore's neighbourhood of Ichhra at the time of Mughal emperor Akbar the Great. The emperor, along with the council of his advisers, introduced the Din-i-Ilahi ("Divine Faith") a syncretic religion intended to merge the best elements of the religions of his empire (primarily Hinduism and Islam; elements were also taken from Christianity, Jainism, and Zoroastrianism) and thereby reconcile the sectarian differences that divided his subjects. Syed Shah Jamal fought against Akbar’s Din-i-Ilahi and brought the people back to orthodox Islam.

== Shrine ==
Jamal died in 1671. His shrine is located near Muslim Town in Shah Jamal Lahore, opposite to Forman Christian (FC) College. Festivities take place there every Thursday. His Urs is conducted annually on the 3rd, 4th, and 5th of Rabi' al-Thani, and is attended by hundreds of thousands of devotees. A characteristic part of the rituals was the late Pappu Sain, who used to play the dhol at the shrine.

== Khalifa Akbar & Sajjada Nasheen ==
His Khalifa Akbar and Sajjada Nasheen Gaddi Nasheen is Pir Dr Syed Ali Hussain Shah Naqvi al Bukhari Hussaini. who is a descendant and the Trustee and successor of Baba Shah Jamal through the Silsila tul Zahab (Silsila-e-Zahab) or Golden Chain. He holds regular Khatam Khawajgan and issues Fatwas.
