= Rani Taj =

Percussion instrument player

Shahanara Taj
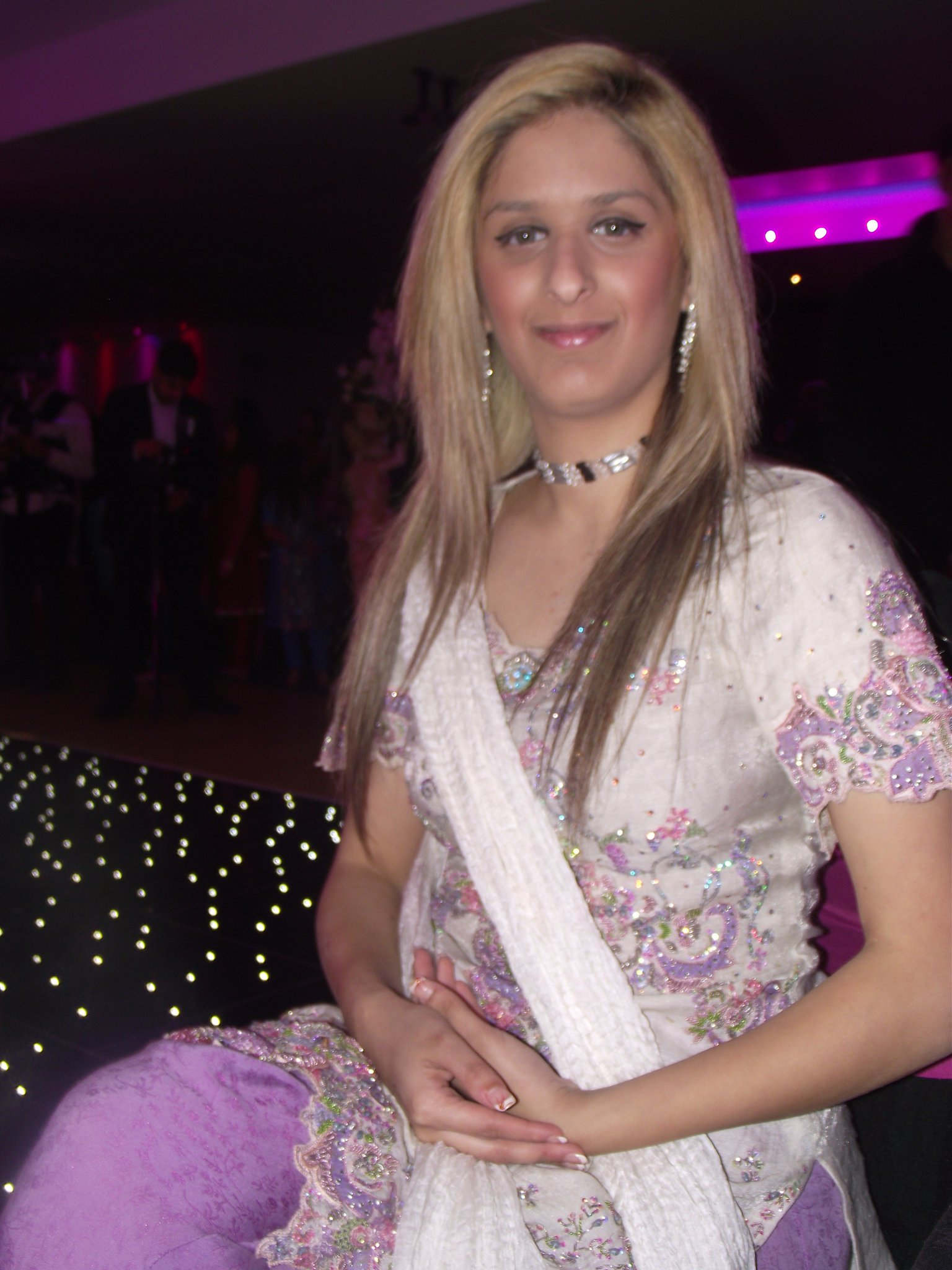

Background information
- Also known as: Rani Taj
- Born: Shahanara Taj; 3 October 1993; Birmingham (UK)
- Genres: Bhangra, hip-hop, R'n'B, folk
- Occupation: International Dhol Player
- Instruments: Dhol, Viola
- Years active: 2009 – present
- Label: None
- Partner: works with Dhol Blasters/Azaad Dhol Group
- Website: ranitajinternational.com

Rani Taj (Urdu: رانی تاج) (born 3 October 1993) is a British Pakistani dhol player from Birmingham, United Kingdom.

Although already well known in the Midlands, she rose to international fame in 2010 when she appeared in a viral video playing live in the street along with a recording of Rihanna's song "Rude Boy".

== Early life ==
The younger of two children, from very early on her mother always called her 'Rani.' The nickname not only stuck but automatically became her stage name.

In an interview with the BBC Asian Network, she states that both of her parents were born in Mirpur, Pakistan. During the construction of The Mangla Dam, like most other British Pakistanis, her family were also displaced from their home. One of those was Rani's maternal grandfather who left for Birmingham to look for work in the 1960s. After establishing himself he sent for his wife and children. Rani's mother was four years old when she joined her father in Britain along with her own mother and siblings. Rani's father joined her mother in Britain after they married in 1990. Rani Taj was born in Birmingham in 1993.

== Musical influences ==
Although, Rani played the dhol since the age of nine, her first instrument was the viola, which she picked up when she was only six whilst at primary school. Towards the end of her primary school career she attended a Vaisakhi Mela, where she saw the Dhol Blasters playing dhol. She immediately fell in love with the Dhol and asked her mother to buy her one so she could learn to play it.

Subsequently, after leaving school she decided to receive professional training. She spent the first couple of years being taught by Gurcharan Mall of the Dhol Blasters and was later also taught by Harjit Singh of the Azaad Dhol Group. Gurcharan Mall had been a dholak player with the group Apna Sangeet and Harjit Singh had been a tabla player with the Azaad Group. Both groups were pioneers in their own right and were part of the first generation of bhangra music to hit the Midlands. As part of the Dhol Blasters Rani also learned to dance bhangra. To gain further experience and provide a service, Rani started to play at all kinds of public events such as festivals, parties and weddings. She initially just wanted to be a regular dhol player like many others but this all changed after her YouTube video went viral.

== Notable sessions ==
In May 2010, dhol player Rani Taj gained widespread attention after a video of her performing in Stoke-on-Trent, Staffordshire, was uploaded to YouTube by a friend. Dressed in traditional Punjabi attire, she was recorded playing a dhol alongside an impromptu mix of Tinie Tempah's single "Pass Out".

The video went viral globally, drawing praise for her skill and technique on the dhol—a double-sided barrel drum traditionally played by men in South Asian folk music. Her performances have contributed to challenging gender roles within the traditionally male-dominated domain of professional dhol playing.

== Tours ==
Rani continues to be a role model to young people across the world and pursues her passion for the Dhol. She has also spent tireless hours playing dhol for charitable causes such as the flood relief in Pakistan and the 2011 Tōhoku earthquake and tsunami. After her YouTube video went viral, she was asked to perform at many venues all over the world including at weddings, charity events and nightclubs. To date, she has played Dhol in New York, Dublin, Hong Kong, Norway, Pakistan and all over Britain. Rani Taj performed at New York in live studio session. She performed along with DJ Rekha and Zuzuka Poderosa in Bhangraween 2011. She also appeared as a guest in a BBC Asian Network program with Noreen Khan

Since 2011 Rani Taj has spent a lot of time with the Sufi dhol players of Pakistan, namely Gunga and Mittu Sain. She is not only fascinated by the 'Qalandari' style of dhol playing but has played alongside them in various Melas and Darbars all over Pakistan. These include the darbars of Baba Shah Jamal, in Lahore, Shabir Shah in Lahore, Baba Lal Shah in Murree, Lal Shahbaz Qalandar in Sindh, Heera Lal Qalandar Mela in Gujar Khan and Daata Mela at Daata Darbar in Lahore.

== Dholis got talent ==
At the United Kingdom's biggest dhol competition held in Smethwick, near Birmingham and organised by Gurcharan Mall, she was invited to become one of the judges of the tournament. Not only was she the only female judge in the final she was also the youngest judge on the senior panel that day.
