= Muslim Town, Lahore =

Muslim Town مسلم ٹاؤن
- Union Council
- Country: Pakistan
- Province: Punjab
- City: Lahore
- Administrative town: Samanabad
- Union council: 216

Government
  - Type: Union Council

Muslim Town (Punjabi, Urdu: u:مسلم ٹاؤن) is a neighbourhood and union council (UC 115) located in Samanabad Tehsil of Lahore, Punjab, Pakistan. It is located on the bank of the Nahr.

== History ==
Muslim Town was founded in 1915 by Dr. Syed Muhammad Hussain (1878-1939), son of Syed Alim Shah. He was a graduate of Lahore Medical School and the Chief Chemical Examiner of Punjab as well as a renowned physician and philanthropist. During the early 20th century, Model Town was an exclusive Hindu locality of Lahore. Muslims could not buy property in that neighborhood and in response to this prejudice, Dr. Muhammad Hussain bought large tracts of agricultural land along the Nahr starting from Shah Jamal to Multan Road. He then hired professionals to plan a residential neighborhood, that was initially named Islamabad. However, in the pre-Pakistan era, Hindus and Sikhs were a dominant force in Lahore. They had planned Model Town, a very exclusive Hindu-Sikh locality in the suburbs of Lahore. To combat this state of affairs, on suggestion of his best friend, Allama Muhammad Iqbal, Dr. Syed Muhammad Hussain decided to rename the locality as "Muslim Town", to emphasize its Muslim character in response to the exclusivity of Model Town as a non Muslim locality.

Dr. Hussain, initially built a house for himself on 80 kanals of this land at #7 Muslim Town and donated plots of varied sizes ranging from 10 marlas to 12 kanals to his numerous relatives, friends, family retainers and household help. Some of his famous friends and early settlers included the renowned artist Ustad Allah Baksh, Abdul Majeed Salik (writer), Maulana Ghulam Rasool Mehr and the renowned Faqir family. Dr Muhammad Hussain constructed a large Mosque on 12 lanals in the memory of his mother for Muslim Town residents and a 2 kanal mosque in front of his house for family use. He also allocated land for a graveyard for his own descendants in Shah Jamal and another graveyard in Muslim Town for the benefit of general public. The Shah Jamal graveyard is under the exclusive custodianship of his great-granddaughter, Dr. Maimoona Asad Raza (PhD) who is also the custodian and Chairperson Board of Directors of all philanthropic institutions donated by Dr Syed Muhammad Hussain and her father Syed Asad Hussain including Government Syed Muhammad Hussain General Hospital and Sanatorium Samli Murree, Govt. Syed Altaf Hussain Eye Hospital in Khanpur Distt Rahimyarkhan. Dr Maimoona financially supports innumerable Philanthropic institutions, hospitals, schools, mosques built by her family, gives scholarships to deserving students, supports countless needy families on monthly basis. Dr. Muhammad Hussain's thousands of kanals of agricultural land surrounding Old Muslim Town was later acquired by (Lahore Municipal Authorities) L.D.A.Lahore Development Authority as part of Shah Jamal, Gulberg and New Muslim Town Schemes according to the rules prevalent in 1950-60 and the family received negligible compensation. The family lost heart and moved out of Old Muslim Town to other parts of Lahore, Pakistan and abroad.

When Dr Hussain's nephew Syed Nazir Hussian contacted tuberculosis, Syed Muhammad Hussain left no stone unturned to get best available medical care for him. However, he realized that most tuberculosis sanatoriums were being run by Hindu philanthropists there was apparent reluctance towards admission of Muslim patients. Dr Muhammad Hussain decided to build a Tuberculosis Sanatorium in Samli, Murree Hills Pakistan. It was that inaugurated by Lord & Lady Linlithgow, Viceroy of India. Dr Hussain ran it free of cost for Muslims and donated it to Red Cross before his death with the condition that first preference will be given to Muslim Tuberculosis patients.After partition it became the largest Sanatorium open to all Pakistanis, that was now a free Muslim country. Recently Govt of Punjab, after taking due legal permissions and signatures of Dr Maimoona Asad Raza, is in the process of adding extensive wards to cater all diseases within the Sanatorium's extensive land holding and with permission of Dr Maimoona, has named it Govt Syed Mohammad Hussian General Hospital Muree.

Dr. Muhammed Hussain's daughter, Safia Begum started an English School for Muslim Children in her 12 kanal house in Muslim Town and hired Mrs. Lewis, an English Lady as its Principal. She became the Headmistress in 1930s imparting modern education to the young until the time when the school had to be closed around partition in 1947. There is a Safia Street and a Safia Park housing estate within Muslim Town named after her memory. She built "Syed Imtiaz Hussain Ward" in memory of her son Syed Imtiaz Hussain in Syed Muhammad Hussain T B Sanatorium Samli. Herdaughter in law Begum Sarawat Imtiaz was the first ever female in West Pakistan to take the oath as Lambardar in 1959. This was cited as a milestone for women empowerment in Pakistan and the Muslim World. Presently her daughter Begum Arshia Azhar is Lambardar of said village i.e. Chak 43/12L. Her eldest daughter Syeda Nuzhat Imtiaz Mashhadi is currently looking after the family Ghoripal and an active political PTI personality. She was one of the Founder members and Senior VP of women wing and General secretary of PTI women wing. D Chichawatni, District Sahiwal. Dr Hussain's Grand Daughter Dr. Shahida Jaffery (PhD.) was the first Vice Chancellor of Sardar Bahadur Khan Women University in Baluchistan.

== Divisions and areas ==
Muslim Town is divided into two major parts Old Muslim Town and New Muslim Town. Old Muslim Town is much less developed and is mainly made up of small 150 sq.ft houses, on the other hand New Muslim Town consists mainly of larger houses ranging between 800 and 2000 sq.ft. Old Muslim Town has one of the highest number of hostels per square meter in Lahore. The total area of Muslim Town 165,000 square meters, New Muslim Town is divided into three main blocks A block (Housing), B block (Industrial), and C block (semi-industrial.) The largest Mosque is the Jamia-Masjid-e-Bilal located between B and C block. There is also a police station in A block, however crime rate is generally low.

== See also ==
- Muslim Town Flyover
