= Caucasian dhol =

Musical instrument

A Caucasian dhol (Armenian: դհոլ, Azerbaijani: nağara, Chechen: вота пондар, romanized: vota pondar, Georgian: დოლი, romanized: doli, Russian: доули, romanized: douli) is a cylindrical drum used in the Caucasus. This drum has traditionally been used by various Caucasian warriors in battles, and today is used in national folk music.

== Construction ==
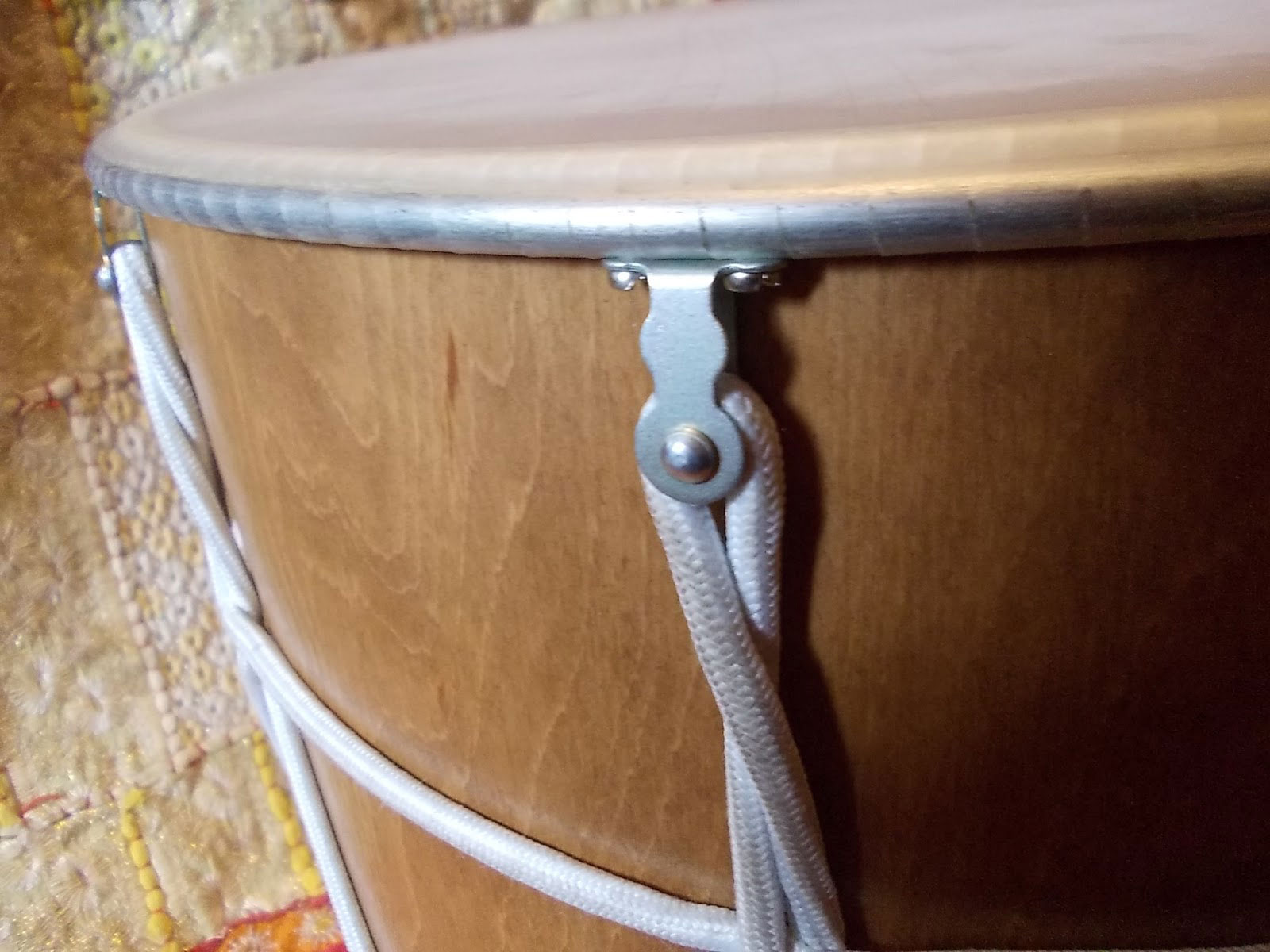
Caucasian Dhol drum

The Сaucasian dhol is a double-sided barrel drum, the shell made from wood or acrylic plastic, and the head from thin leather or synthetic plastic film. The traditional preference is a walnut wood shell and goat skin heads. The skin or plastic film is be spanned on a strong iron round rod, strong during the tuning up of the drum heads the rod should not be bent, the round rod is optimal for touch hands. Adjustments are made by hemp or synthetic rope.

== Playing ==
The Сaucasian dhol is mostly played as an accompanying instrument with the Garmon, Zurna and Clarinet. There are two playing variants, one with hands and the second with two wooden sticks. Usually the sticks are made of dogwood as a heavy type of wood is preferred.

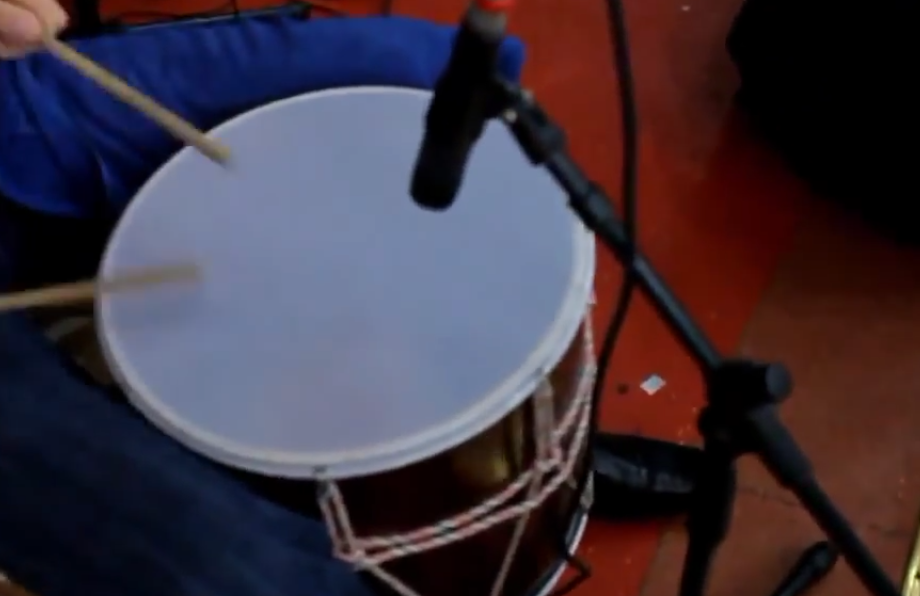
Caucasian drum - wooden sticks playing

== Regional forms and traditions ==
=== Armenia ===
In Armenia, the drum is called Dhol, and is made from natural thin leather skins or plastic film heads. The shell is wooden or acrylic plastic. The Armenian dhol was traditionally played with a wand and a club, each one hitting a different side of the drum, or more rarely with the bare hands. Nowadays, bare hands are preferred.

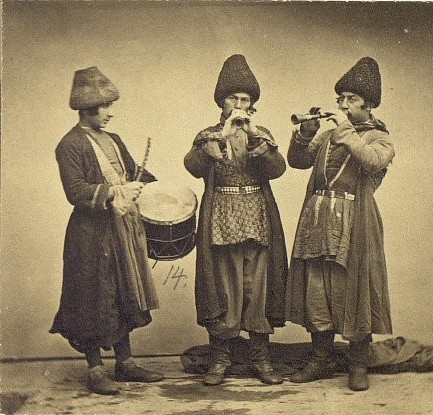
Armenian musicians from Tbilisi playing two Zurnas and a Dhol, late 19th century.

=== Chechnya and Ingushetia ===
In Chechnya and Ingushetia it's called Fuott or Wuott. It is made from cylindrical wooden shell and acoustic membrane from natural leather skin, traditionally played with the bare hands.

=== Georgia ===
In Georgia it is called Dholi or Doli. Georgian dhols mostly use natural thick leather skin heads and a wooden shell. The playing is almost entirely done with the hands.

=== Azerbaijan ===
In Azerbaijan, it is called the Nağara, played with sticks in Northwestern Azerbaijan. It is made up of wood and has a plastic head commonly.

=== Southern Russia ===
In Southern Russia it is called Doul, and is almost identical to the Armenian variant.
