= Pappu Sain =

Pakistani musician (died 2021)

Pappu Sain (Urdu: پپو سائیں; born 1956 – died 7 November 2021) was a sufi dhol player from Pakistan. He performed every Thursday evening at the tomb of Shah Jamal in Ichhra, Lahore.

His band was known as Qalandar Bass. Pappu Sain was accompanied by his son Qalandar Baksh and others. He died of liver cancer in Lahore in November 2021.
