= Dhol =

Double-headed Indian drum

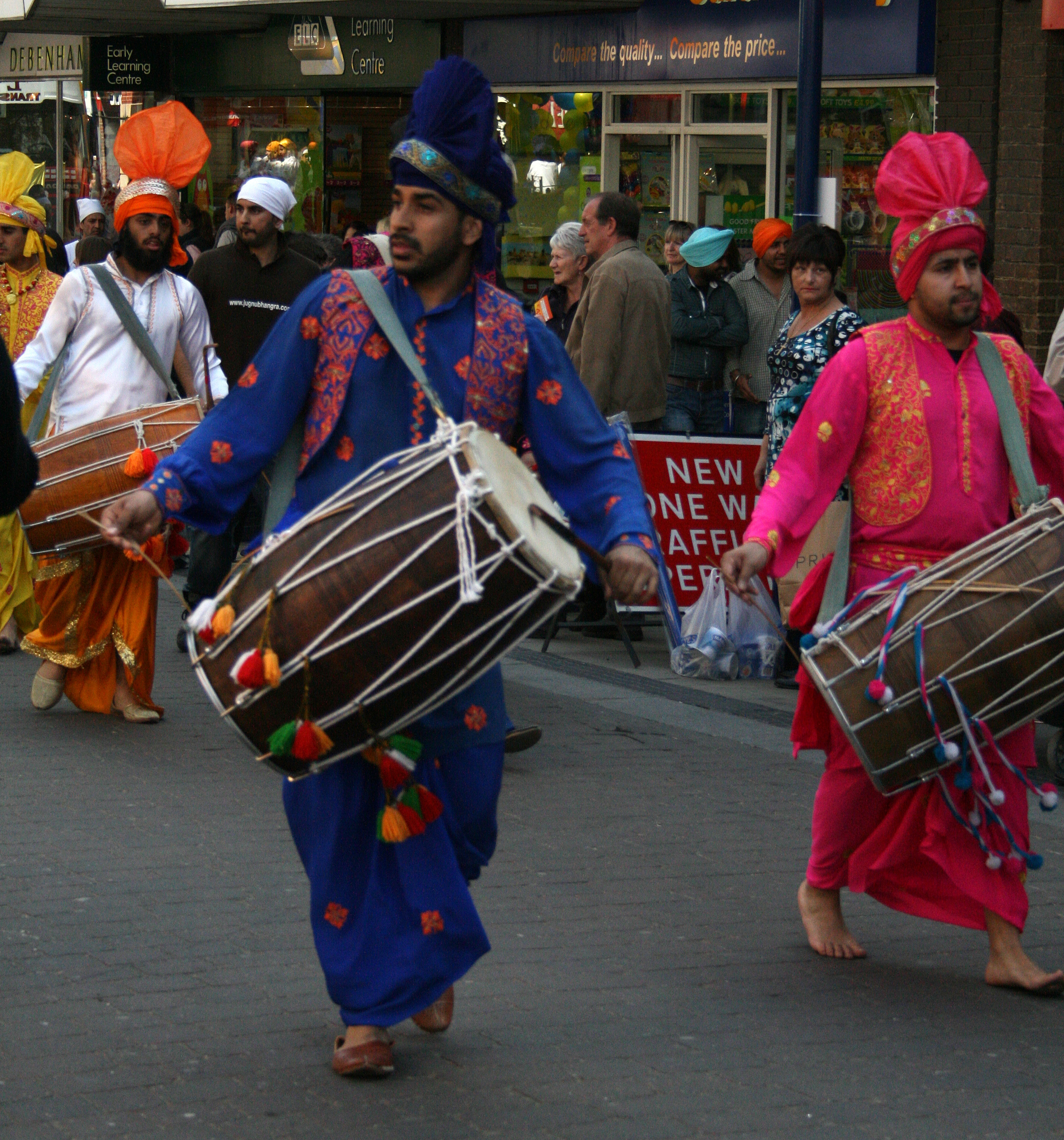
- Classification: Membranophone

Related instruments
- Dholki

More articles or information
- Garba, Bhangra, Music of Punjab, Bihu Dance

A dhol

Dhol (Hindi pronunciation: [ɖʰoːl]) can refer to any one of a number of similar types of double-headed drum widely used, with regional variations, throughout the Indian subcontinent. Its range of distribution in Indian subcontinent primarily includes northern areas such as the Jammu, Himachal, Punjab, Haryana, Delhi, Kashmir, Sindh, Assam Valley, Uttarakhand, West Bengal, Odisha, Gujarat, Maharashtra, Konkan, Goa, Karnataka, Rajasthan, Bihar, Jharkhand and Uttar Pradesh. A related instrument is the dholak or dholki. Dhols are amongst other events used in Indian wedding ceremony processions such as Baraat or Varyatra.

Someone who plays the dhol is known as dholi.

== Etymology ==
The word Dhol is derived from Sanskrit word ḍhola, a term for drum in Sanskrit language.

== Construction ==
The dhol is a double-sided barrel drum played mostly as an accompanying instrument in regional music forms. In Qawwali music, the term dhol is used to describe a similar, but smaller drum with a smaller tabla, as a replacement for the left-hand tabla drum. The typical sizes of the drum vary slightly from region to region. In Punjab, the dhol remains large and bulky to produce the preferred loud bass. In other regions, dhols can be found in varying shapes and sizes, and made with different woods and materials (fiberglass, steel, plastic). The drum consists of a wooden barrel with animal hide or synthetic skin stretched over its open ends, covering them completely. These skins can be stretched or loosened with a tightening mechanism made up of either interwoven ropes, or nuts and bolts. Tightening or loosening the skins subtly alters the pitch of the drum sound. The stretched skin on one of the ends is thicker and produces a deep, low-frequency (higher bass) sound and the other thinner one produces a higher-frequency sound. Dhols with synthetic, or plastic, treble skins are common.

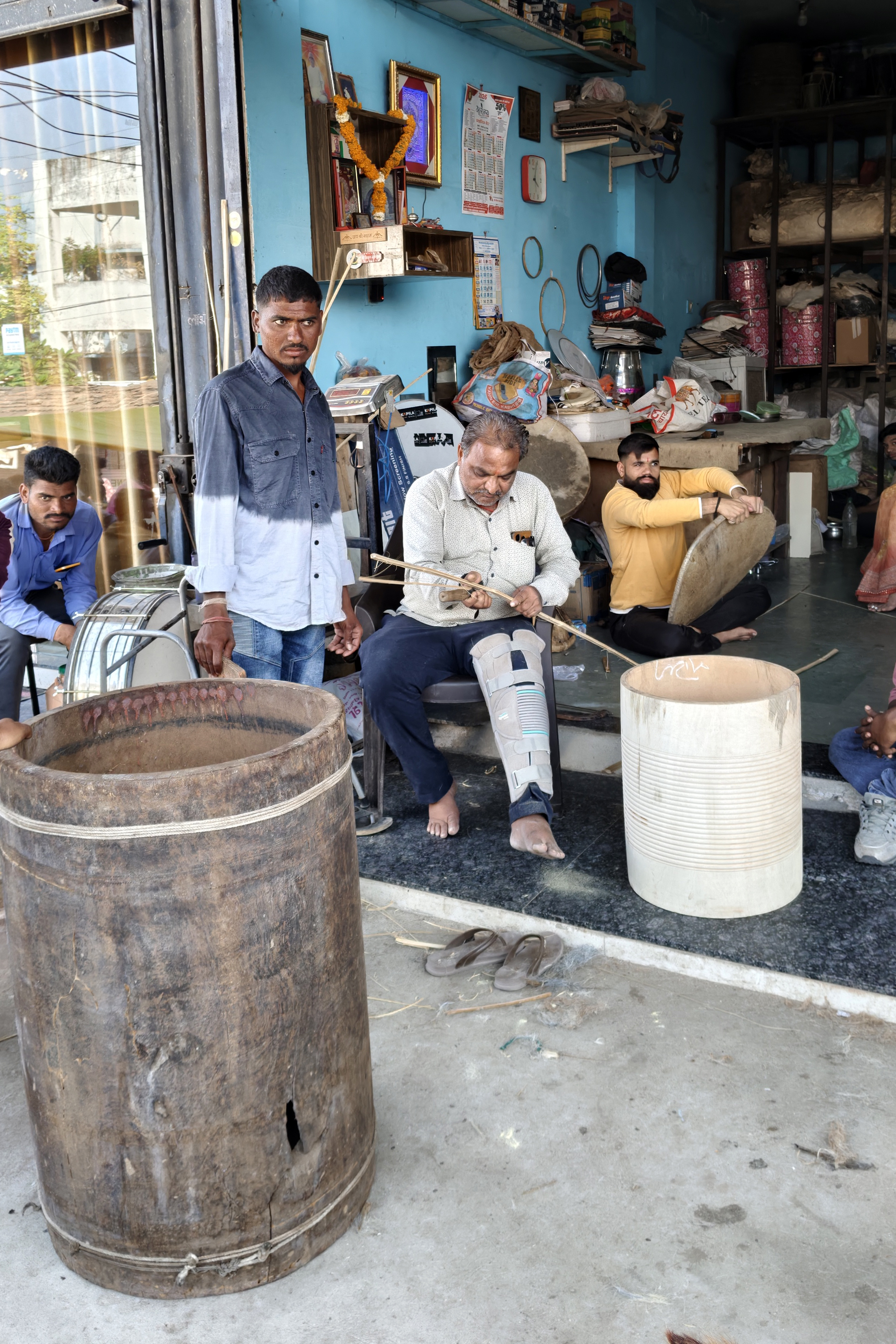
Traditional Bhil community Dhol making process in Jhabua, Madhya Pradesh, India

== Playing ==
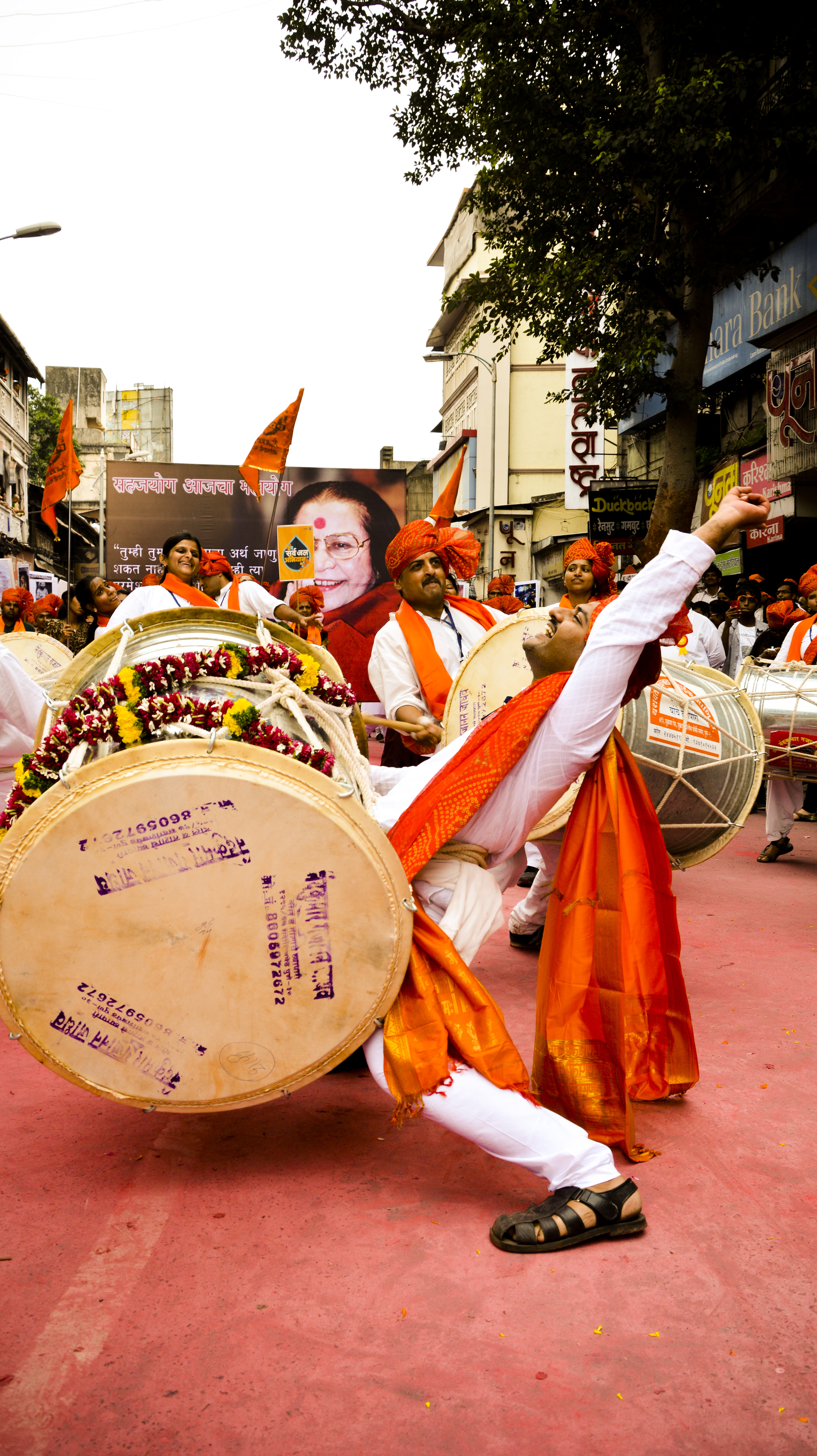
A dhol player in Pune, India

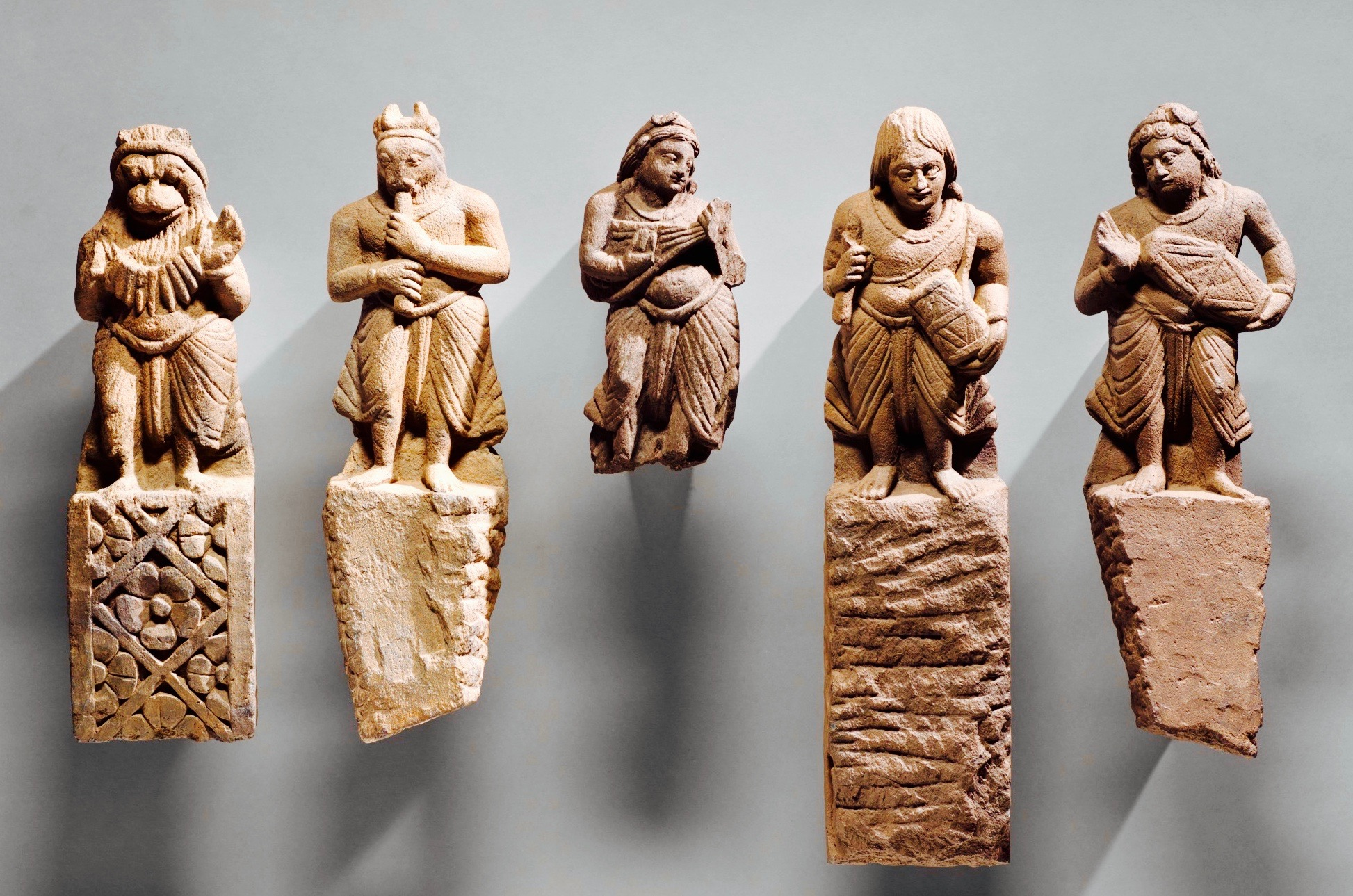
Gandhara musicians playing dhol

The dhol is played using two wooden sticks, usually made out of wood, cane, or also known as wickers cane. The stick used to play the bass side of the instrument is known as the dagga in Punjabi. Traditionally the Dhol player would go and look for a branch from a hardwood tree known as Tali (oak or mahogany) that was naturally curved at that angle and use this as the Dagga (Bass Stick). The reason for the bend stick is because of the goat skin. This is thin like 80-100gsm paper, so the stick has to be bent to avoid piercing the skin. The bass stick or Dagga is the thicker of the two and is bent in an eighth- or quarter-circular arc on the end that strikes the instrument. The other stick, known as the teeli, is much thinner and flexible and used to play the higher note end of the instrument.

The dhol is slung over the shoulder or, more rarely, around the neck of the player with a strap usually made up of woven cotton. The surface of the wooden barrel is in some cases decorated with engraved patterns and sometimes paint.

In the pre-Partition era, dozens of rhythms were played on the Punjabi dhol, which corresponded to specific functions. However, with the decline or disappearance of some cultural practices, recent generations of dhol players have become unfamiliar with many of these. At the same time, the growth of folkloric staged bhangra dance in Punjab inspired the creation of many new rhythms particular to that dance.

Some of the most common dhol rhythms are bhangra (originating with the old, community bhangra dance), dhamaal (associated with Sufi devotional dance), and kaharva, a dance and song rhythm. The staged "bhangra" dance, originating in the 1950s, gave special prominence to kaharva, for the performance of actions called luddi. In the 1970s, many more actions were added to staged bhangra to go with the kaharva rhythm, which started to become one of the most prominent rhythms associated with the dance. At the same time, this type of rhythm would be played on the dholki drum to accompany Punjabi songs. So when, in the 1990s, Punjabi pop songs began to evoke bhangra dance, they used the kaharva rhythm. It is known now by various names. Some dhol players call it kaharva, its technical name, while other players call it luddi to refer to the dance of that name. With the style of dhol-playing that developed in the U.K., the name chaal was adopted, probably in reference to the "chaal" (movements) it accompanies in modern bhangra. Johnny Kalsi is a UK Dhol player that established a syllabus to teach the art of playing this instrument. Although there is no official syllabus or phrasing for the learning process, he took the notation of the North Indian tabla to visualise the beats.

The introduction of electronic devices such as tape recorders has led to a decline in the importance of dhol players in celebratory events. Nevertheless, dhol music still figures in the studio recordings of present-day raas, garba and bhangra music artists.

== History ==
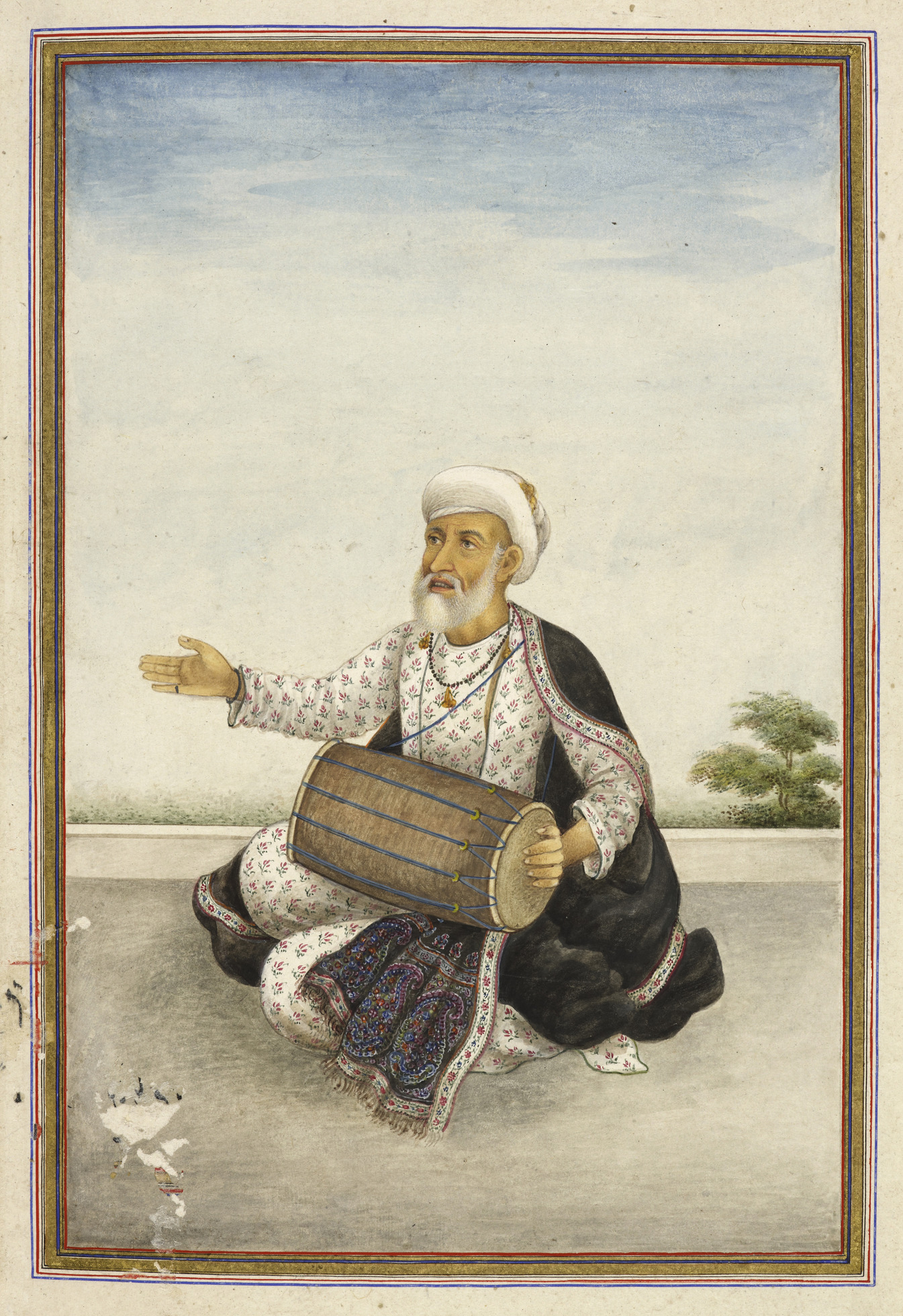
A man depicted playing dhol

Shail Vyas claims several percussion instruments such as the Dhol maybe came from the influence of some clay-made instruments that are similar to the Dhol, which are found in Indus Valley Civilisation. Dhol is depicted in earliest ancient Indian sculptural arts as one of the chief percussion instruments for ancient Indian music along with tabla. Ain-i-Akbari, describes the use of Dhol in the orchestra of the Mughal emperor Akbar the Great. The Indo-Aryan word "dhol" appears in print around 1800 in the treatise Sangitasara.

== Regional forms and traditions ==
=== The Punjab region ===
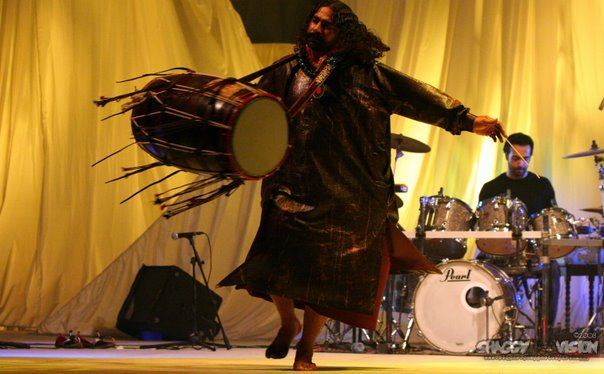
Sufi dhol player Pappu Saeen, from Pakistan

The Punjabi dhol is used in the Punjab region of Pakistan and northern India. In Pakistan, the dhol is mostly played in the Punjab region; however, it is also used throughout the country ranging from as far south as Karachi and as far north as Khyber Pakhtunkhwa. In India it is found in the states of Punjab, Himachal Pradesh, Haryana, and Delhi. The beats of dhol have been an element in the ceremonies of the great Sufi mystics and their followers. The patterns of dhol have been developed to catalyze the mind of the devotee who is seeking spiritual trance.

=== Assam ===
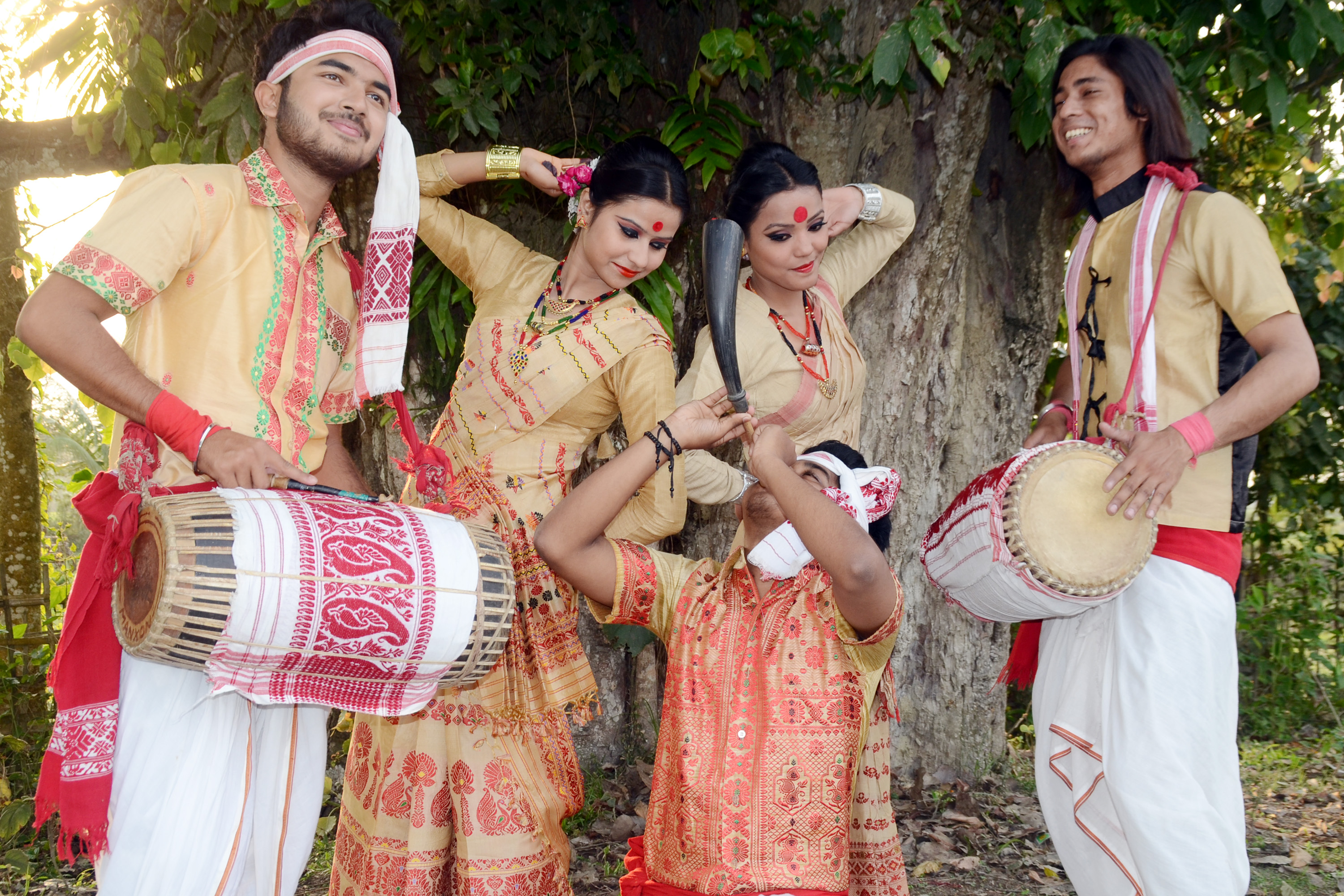
Men playing Assamese dhol during Bihu, Assam, India

In Assam, the dhol is widely used in Rongali Bihu (Bohag Bihu), the Assamese new year celebrations in the month of April. Celebrated in mid-April every year (usually on 14 or 13 April according to the Assamese traditional calendar), the dhol is an important and a quintessential instrument used in Bihu dance. The origin of the Dhol in Assam dates back to at least the 14th century when it was referred in Assamese Buranjis as being played by the indigenous people. This shows that the origin of Dhol in Assam was much older than the rest of India, and the name was probably due to sanskritisation. The people of the Valley reckon that the beats of the dhol are enchanting for people even at a long distance. Played by using a bamboo stick with bare hands, the Assamese dhol is made up of a wooden barrel with the ends covered primarily with animal hide (unlike the rest of the Indian subcontinent, where it could be a synthetic skin as well), that can either be stretched or loosened by tightening the interwoven straps. The dhol player is termed Dhulia and the expert in dhol is termed Ojah (Assamese: ওজা).

The Khol a kind of dhol also has an aspect of symbolism in Assamese culture, and one considers it to be a "devo badyo" (Assamese: দেৱ বাদ্য) or an instrument of god believed to be brought to Earth by the Pandavas.

=== Goa ===
Dhol (which is always accompanied by tasha, cymbals, etc.) is an important part of Goan shigmo celebrations. It also is an important part of Goan temple music; the temple dhol was traditionally played by a specific caste.

=== Gujarat ===
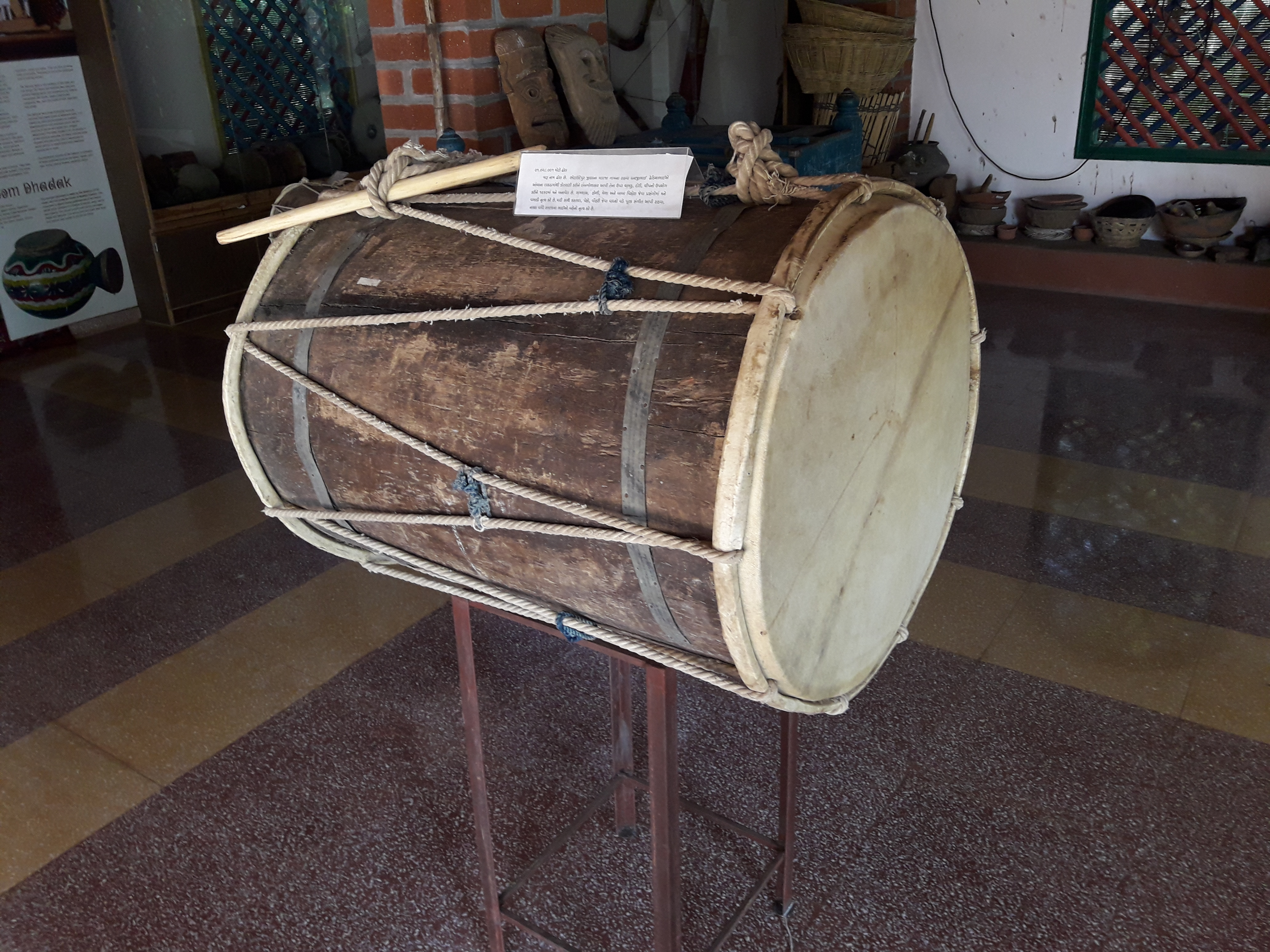
Dhol of Adivasi people of Gujarat, India

The dhol was used by Gujaratis during celebrations such as Navaratri to accompany garba. Garba are the folk songs which describe the grace of the divine mother. It is one of the important musical instruments in Gujarat.

=== Maharashtra ===
In Maharashtra, dhol is a primary instrument used in Ganesh festivals. In the city of Pune, locals come together to form dhol pathaks (troupes). Pune supposedly has the largest number of dhols in India. In the city of Nagpur, there are many troupes that play dhol on festivals and other occasions. Here dhol is referred to as 'Sandhal'. Dhol is made up of two stretched membranes tied by a strong string. One side of the dhol is played by wooden stick called "tiparu", on that side black coloured ink paste stick in the centre. This membrane is called the "dhum". In technical language, it is called base. Another side of dhol is called "thapi" or "chati". In technical language, it is called as tremer, this side of membrane is only played by palm. Boll of the dhol is "Taa", "Dhin" and "Dha". "Taa" for the "Thapi" side, "Dhin" for the "Dhum" side and "Dha" for both sides played together.

=== Karnataka ===
Called Dhollu in Kannada, the folk dance is known as Dollu Kunitha -Kunitha meaning dance. The folk art is mainly preserved and performed by the people of the Kuruba community of Karnataka.

=== Uttarakhand ===
In the Garhwal region, specific musical caste groups like the auji, das or dholi have historically played the dhol and damau, the two folk instruments of the region, at special occasions or religious festivals according to the Dhol Sagar, an ancient treatise that was transmitted orally and by practical teaching.

=== Bengal ===
The "dhak" (Bengali: ঢাক) is a huge membranophone instrument from Bangladesh and West Bengal. The shapes differ from almost cylindrical to the barrel. The manner of stretching the hide over the mouths and lacing also varies. It is suspended from the neck, tied to the waist and kept on the lap or the ground, and usually played with wooden sticks. The left side is coated to give it a heavier sound.

Drum beats are an integral part of Durga Puja. It is mostly played by the Bengali Hindu community.

=== Pashtun areas ===
The dhol is the main musical instrument in the Pashtun dance known as attan. The Afghan and Iranian Dohol is not the same drum on the Indian subcontinent.

=== Caucasus ===
Caucasian dhol is called dhol in Armenia, dholi or doli in Georgia and Abkhazia, and doul in North Caucasus.

=== In global culture ===
It has become popular in other parts of the world due to Indian diaspora and diaspora from the Indian subcontinent. Dhol has been a popular musical instrument in formal and informal dance performances for decades.

== See also ==
- Dholak
- Dohol
- Khol
- Davul
- Nagara
- Dhak
- Chenda
- Caucasian Dhol
- Indian musical instruments
- Attan
- Bhangra (music)
- Music of Punjab
- Bihu
- Bihu dance
- Garba
- Pappu Saeen
- Rani Taj
