= Bahria Town Rawalpindi =

Residential area in Rawalpindi, Pakistan

Bahria Town بحریہ ٹاؤن
- Gated community
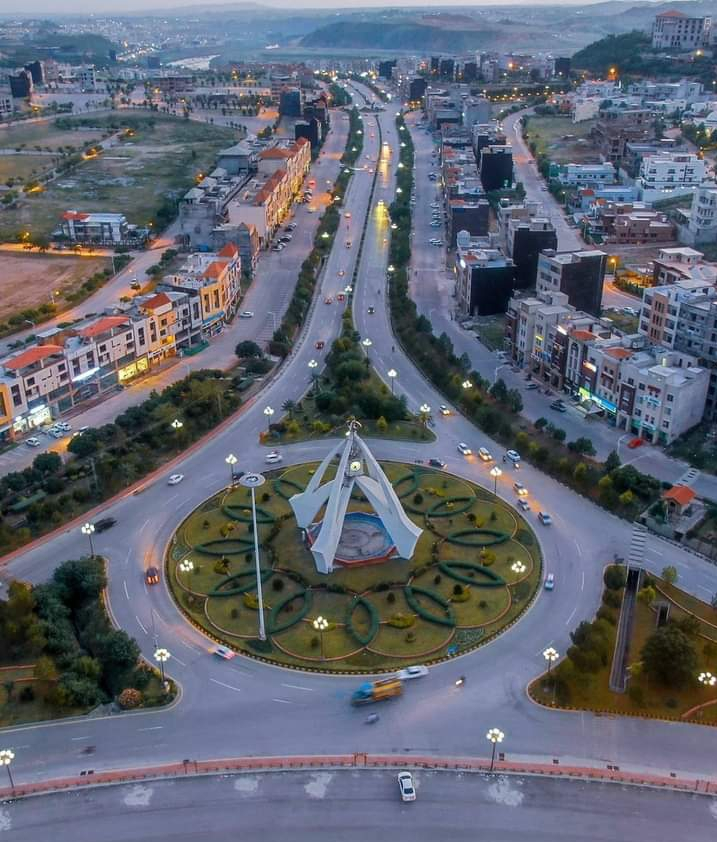
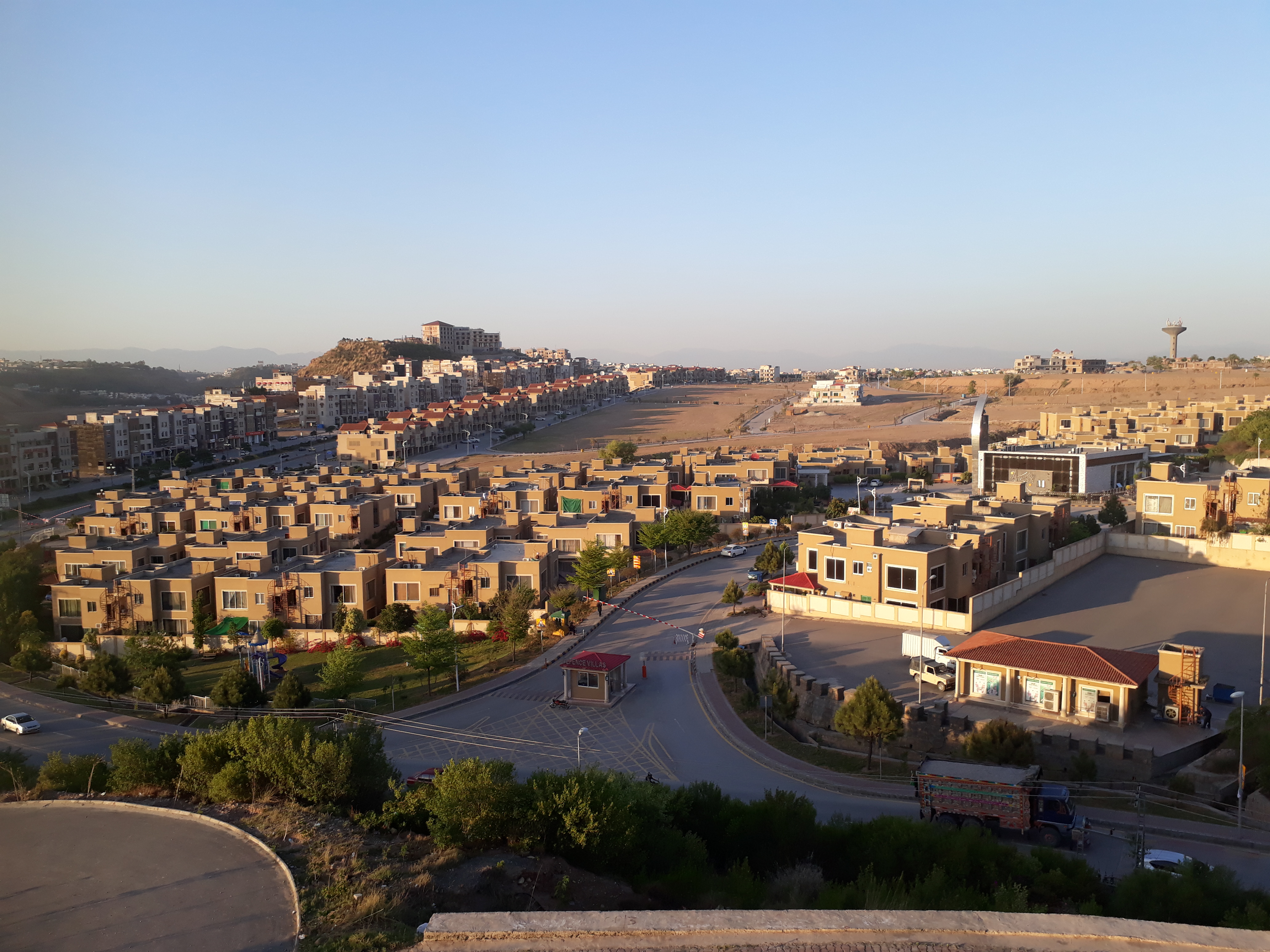
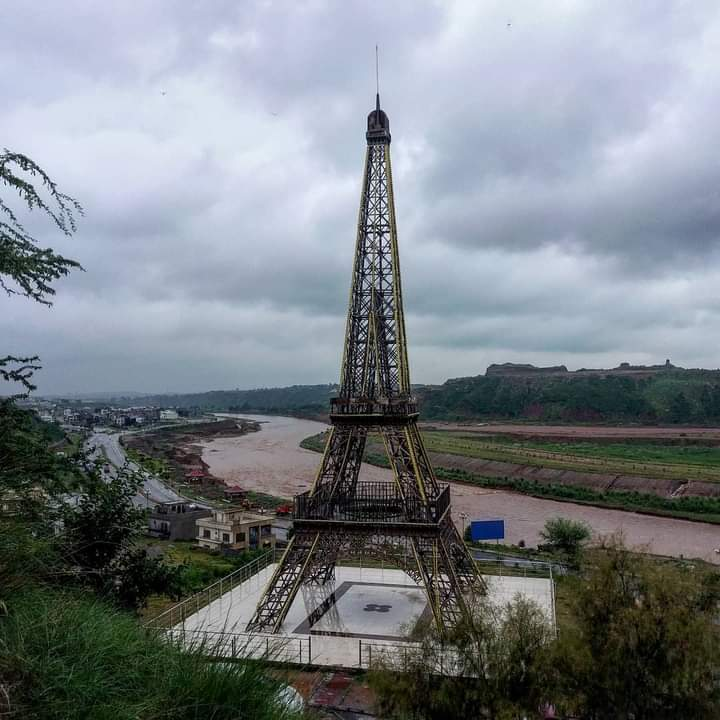
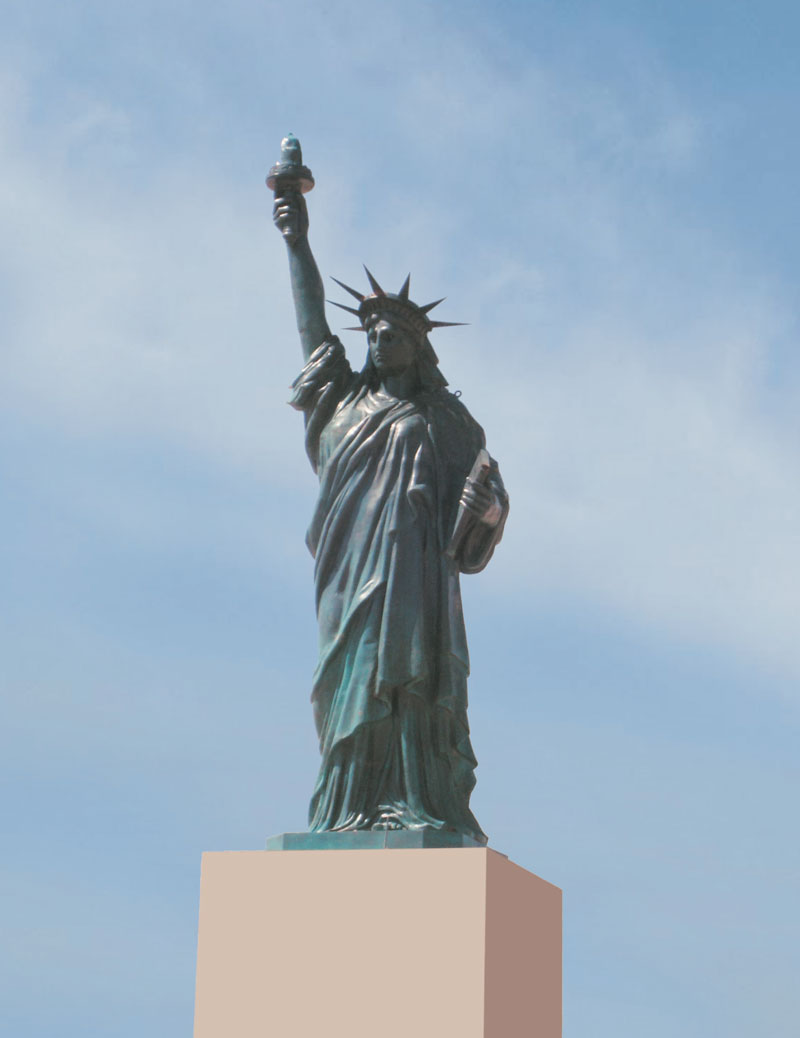
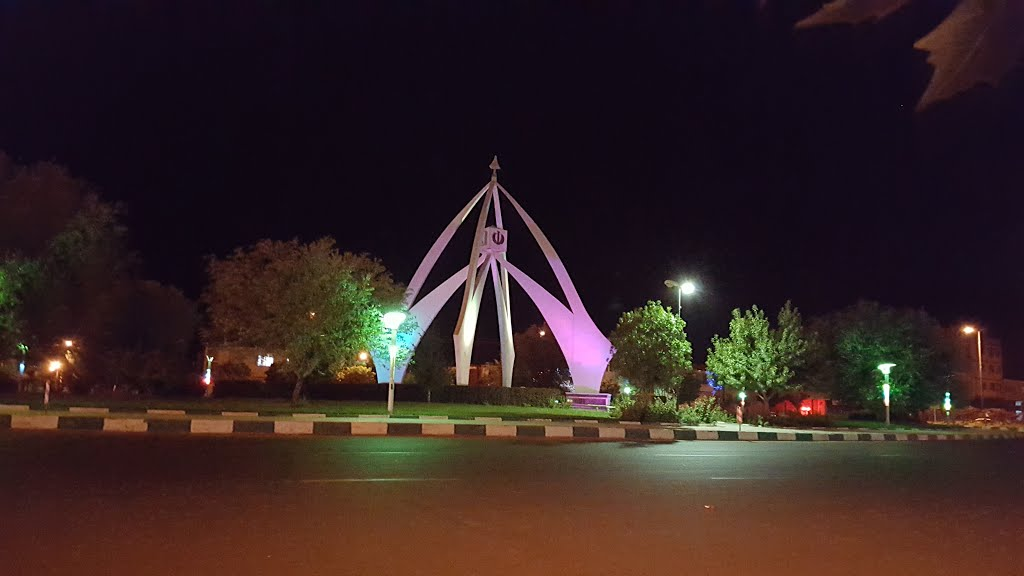
- Country: Pakistan
- Territory: Islamabad–Rawalpindi metropolitan area
- City: Rawalpindi; Islamabad

Bahria Town Rawalpindi (Urdu: بحریہ ٹاؤن راولپنڈی) is a privately owned gated community located within the Islamabad–Rawalpindi metropolitan area near the capital city of Islamabad, Pakistan. The suburb was developed and is owned by Malik Riaz and his Bahria Town company.

The gated community, housing over 100,000 people, is developed as a series of phased projects. Unlike typical housing societies in Pakistan, it features its own independent power supply, generating and distributing electricity to residents through the Bahria Town Electric Supply Company.

It is the oldest and first project of Malik Riaz. It was originally known as "Bahria Town Islamabad" due to its partial location in the capital territory, however with the subsequent launch of "Bahria Enclave" in Islamabad, it is now simply called Bahria Town.
