= Grand Jamia Mosque, Lahore =

Mosque in Lahore, Punjab, Pakistan

Grand Jamia Mosque
- گرینڈ جامع مسجد
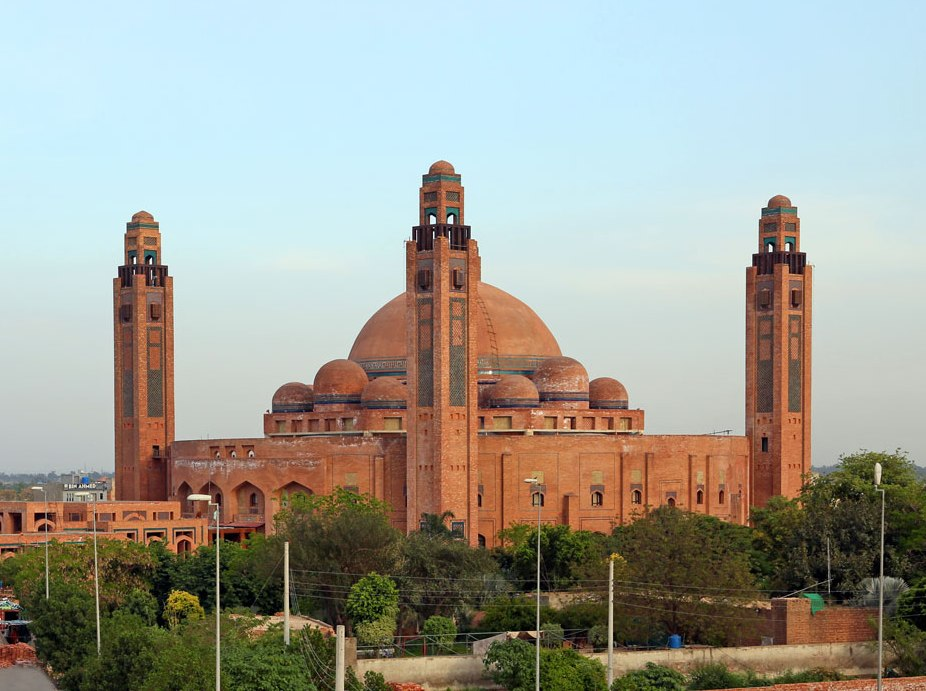

- Location within Lahore

Religion
- Affiliation: Sunni Islam
- Ownership: Malik Riaz
- Leadership: Tahir Mehmood Ashrafi
- Year consecrated: 2014

Location
- Location: Bahria Town, Lahore, Pakistan
- Coordinates: 31.368100°N 74.185787°E

Architecture
- Architect: Nayyar Ali Dada
- Type: mosque
- Style: Islamic, Mughal revival
- Founder: Malik Riaz
- Funded by: Malik Riaz
- Construction cost: Rs. 4 billion (US$14 million)

Specifications
- Capacity: 70,000 worshipers
- Dome: 21
- Minaret: 4
- Minaret height: 165 feet

Website
- Grand Jamia Masjid.com

Grand Jamia Mosque Lahore (Urdu: گرینڈ جامع مسجد) is a mosque located in Bahria Town, Lahore, Pakistan. With a capacity of 70,000 worshippers, it is the third largest mosque in Pakistan and the fourteenth largest mosque in the world.

Designed by Nayyar Ali Dada, it was inaugurated on Eid al-Adha on 6 October 2014. It can accommodate 25,000 worshipers indoors, while the courtyard and corridor leading to the main halls of worship can accommodate a total of 70,000. The architecture is influenced by Badshahi Masjid, Wazir Khan Mosque and Sheikh Zayed Grand Mosque, with construction costs of over 4 billion rupees (or approximately $39 million).

The structure comprises four minarets, each 165 ft tall, and a grand dome, which is surrounded by 20 smaller domes. The exterior is surfaced with 4 million handmade Multani tiles. The interior is decorated with custom-made carpets imported from Turkey and over 50 chandeliers imported from Iran. One of the floors consists of an Islamic heritage museum displaying rare Quranic collections, an Islamic library and also an Islamic art gallery with various antique artifacts. Over four million Multani handcrafted mosaic tiles cover the surface area of the mosque.

== Design ==
The base of the entire structure is elevated 20 feet above the ground, with the rooftop elevating to 80 feet and the Grand Dome placed in the center surrounded by 20 smaller domes. Marking the extremities of the entire structure are the towering minarets standing 165 feet tall. The mosque includes 6 arched shape wooden doors and then dazzles you with views of white chandeliers, tile-mosaic and frescos of extraordinary beauty. The Center Dome is the crown jewel of this magnificent piece of craftsmanship, rising 40 ft. in height and spreading 50 ft.

The indigenous Architecture is woven in entirely local materials, reflecting the true essence of Indo-Islamic architecture with a rich blend of modern elements. The main structure is created from "Brick Gutka" made of special "Multani Mitti" to avoid saltpeter commonly found in Lahore Bricks. The brick structure has been extensively decorated with vibrant colored glazed tile mosaic art, displayed in geometrical shapes and floral patterns. It was designed to be an architectural wonder that incorporated both modern and classic Islamic artistic styles. Greek and Italian white marble covers the exterior, while Islamic calligraphy decorates the inside. 4.5 million handmade ceramic tiles were hand placed by the craftsmen, which alone took 4 years. The octagonal shaped minarets stand majestically tall at 165 ft. and are a beautiful exhibit of craftsmanship. The base of each minaret has 4 arch shaped wooden doors decorated with extensive mosaic art in vibrant colors that ascend all the way to the top of the structure. Each minaret has wooden balconies made from "Sheesham" and the rooftops are cupola shaped canopies.

The landscaped courtyard has been designed in the typical "Charbagh" style, which is a Persian-style garden layout seen in many great mosques of the Sub-Continent. The quad shaped garden is divided into four sections, through four walkways with a beautiful water fountain in the center.

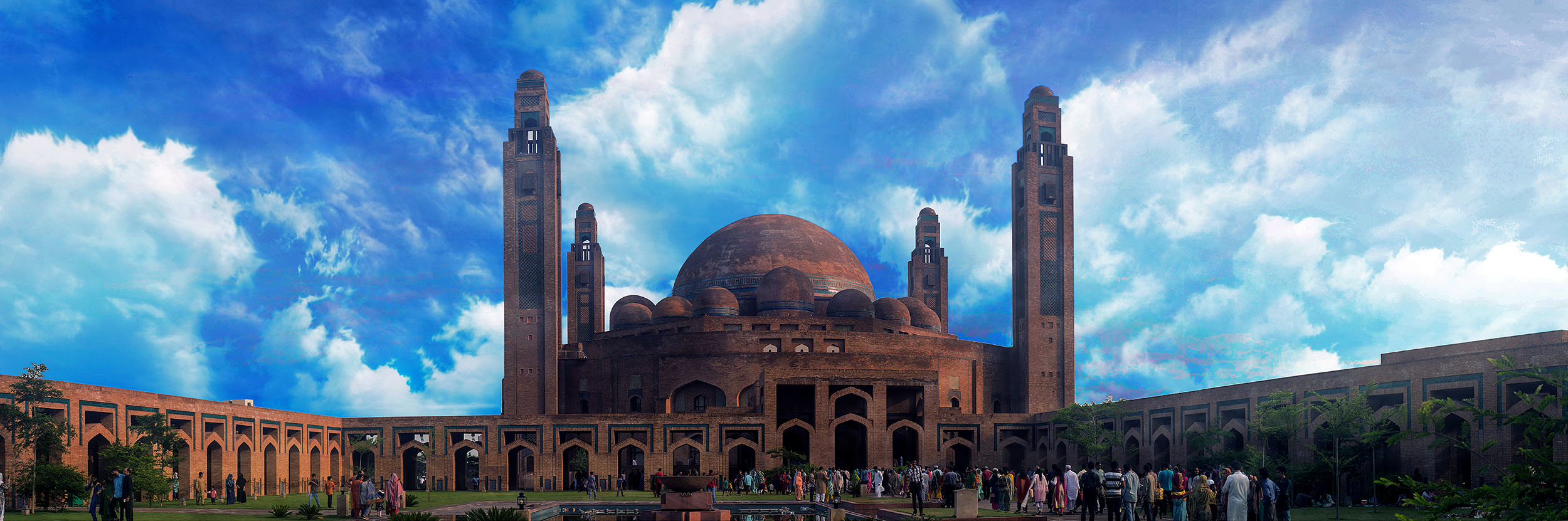
Panorama of the Bahria Grand Mosque

== Gallery ==
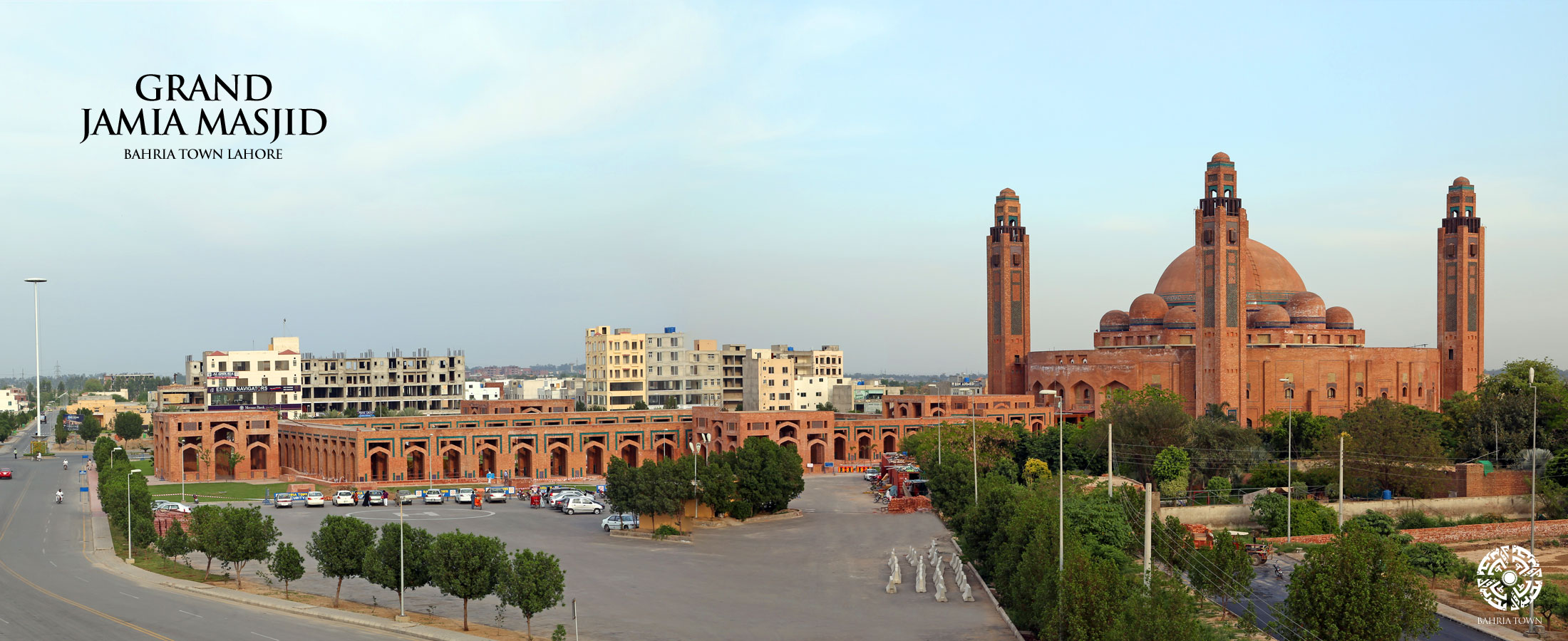
A view of Bahria Grand Mosque

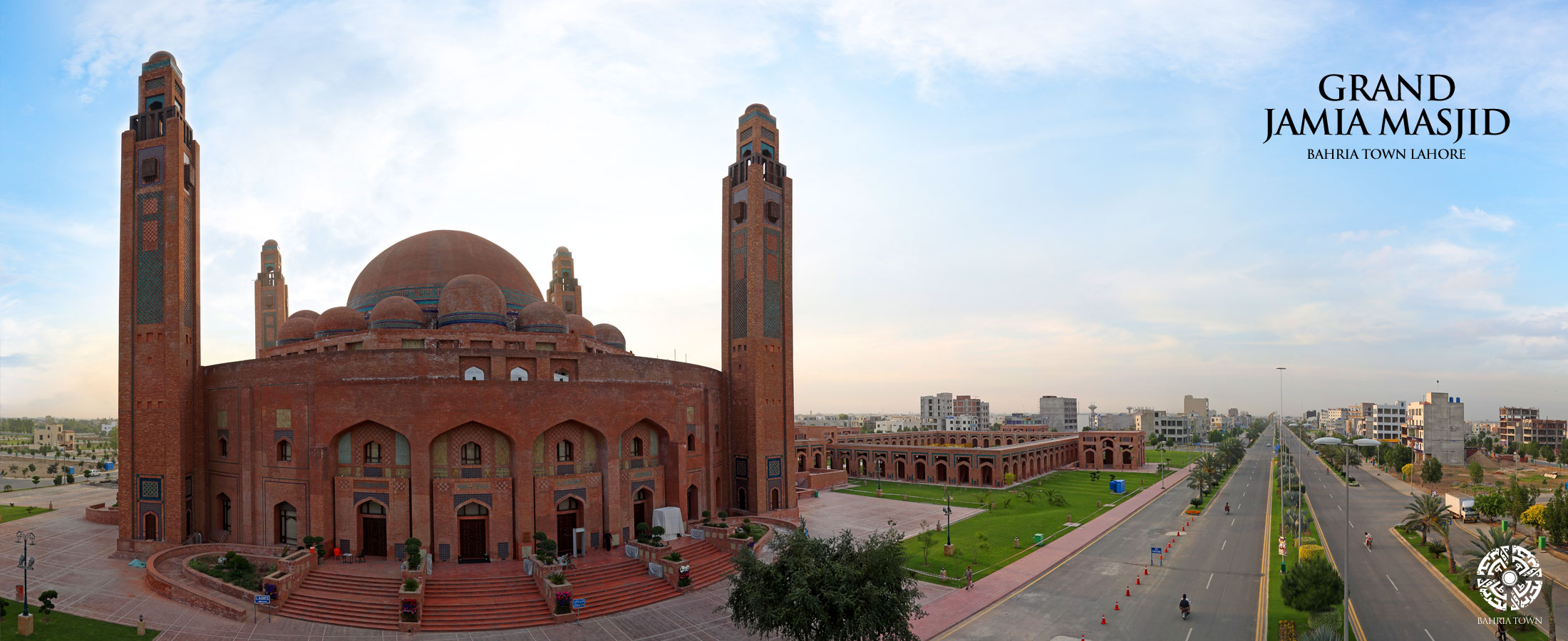
Back view of the Bahria Grand Mosque

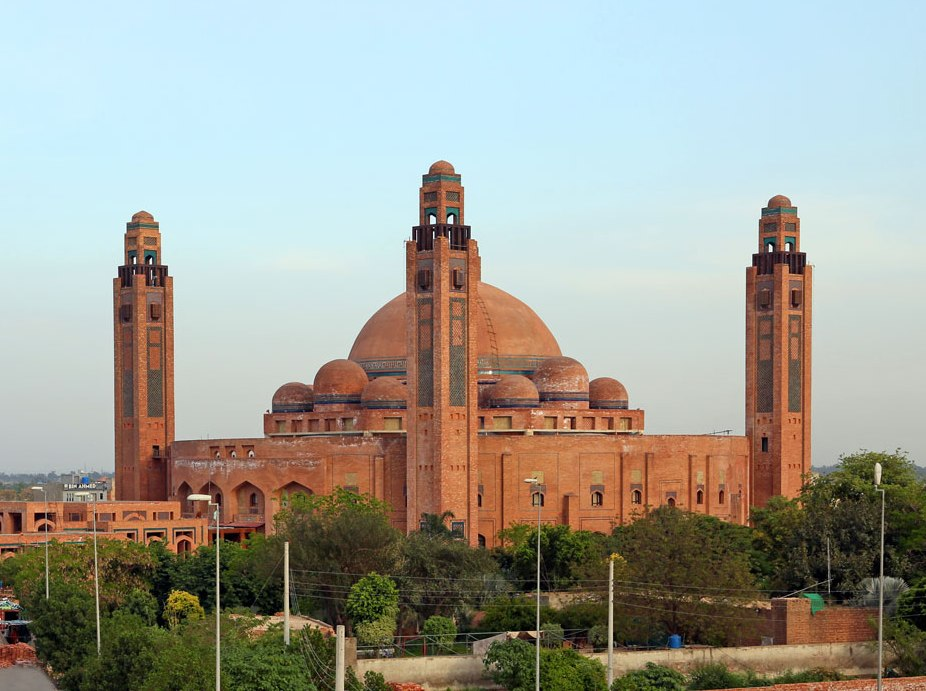
Bahria Grand Mosque is Pakistan's third largest mosque.

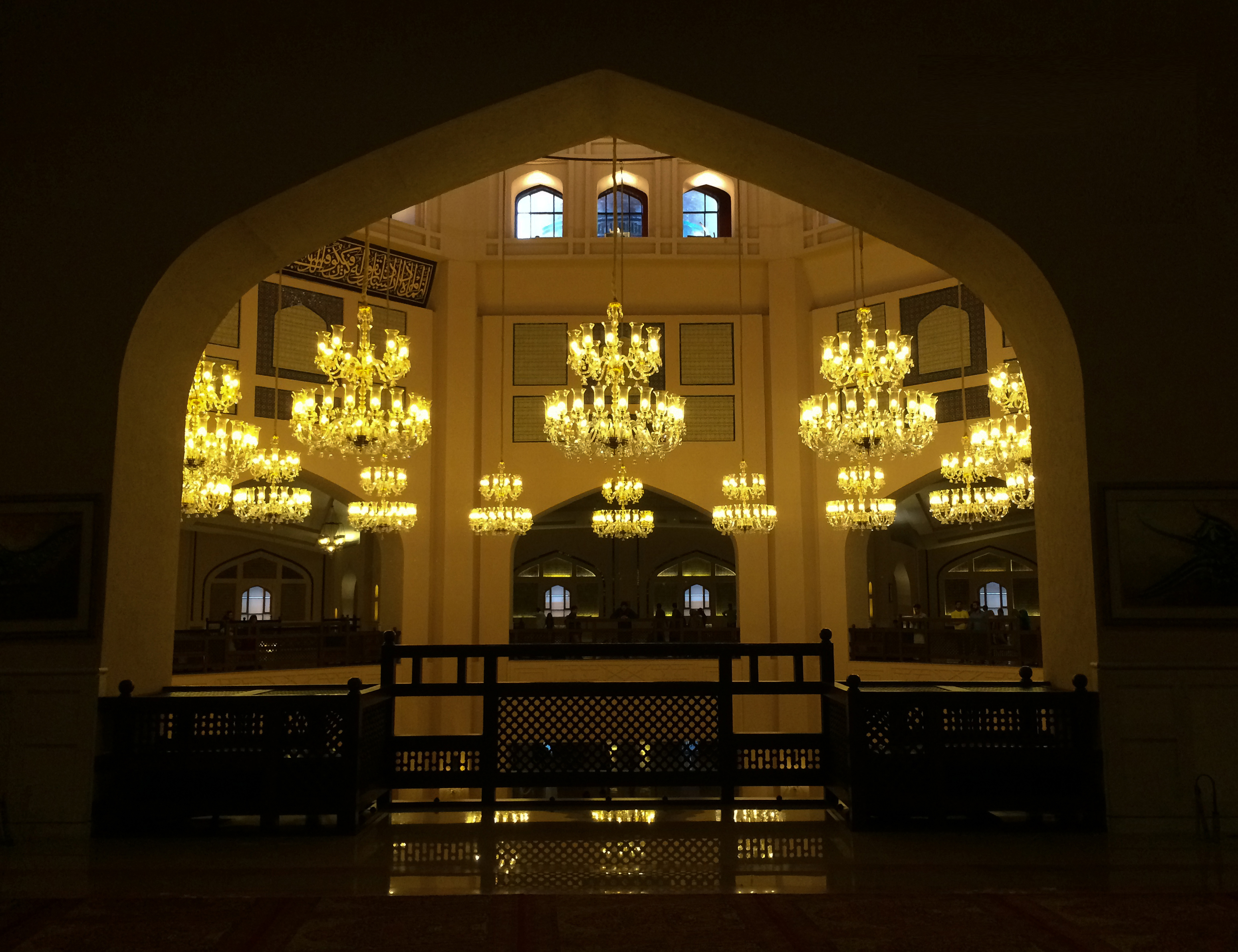
The interior of the mosque.

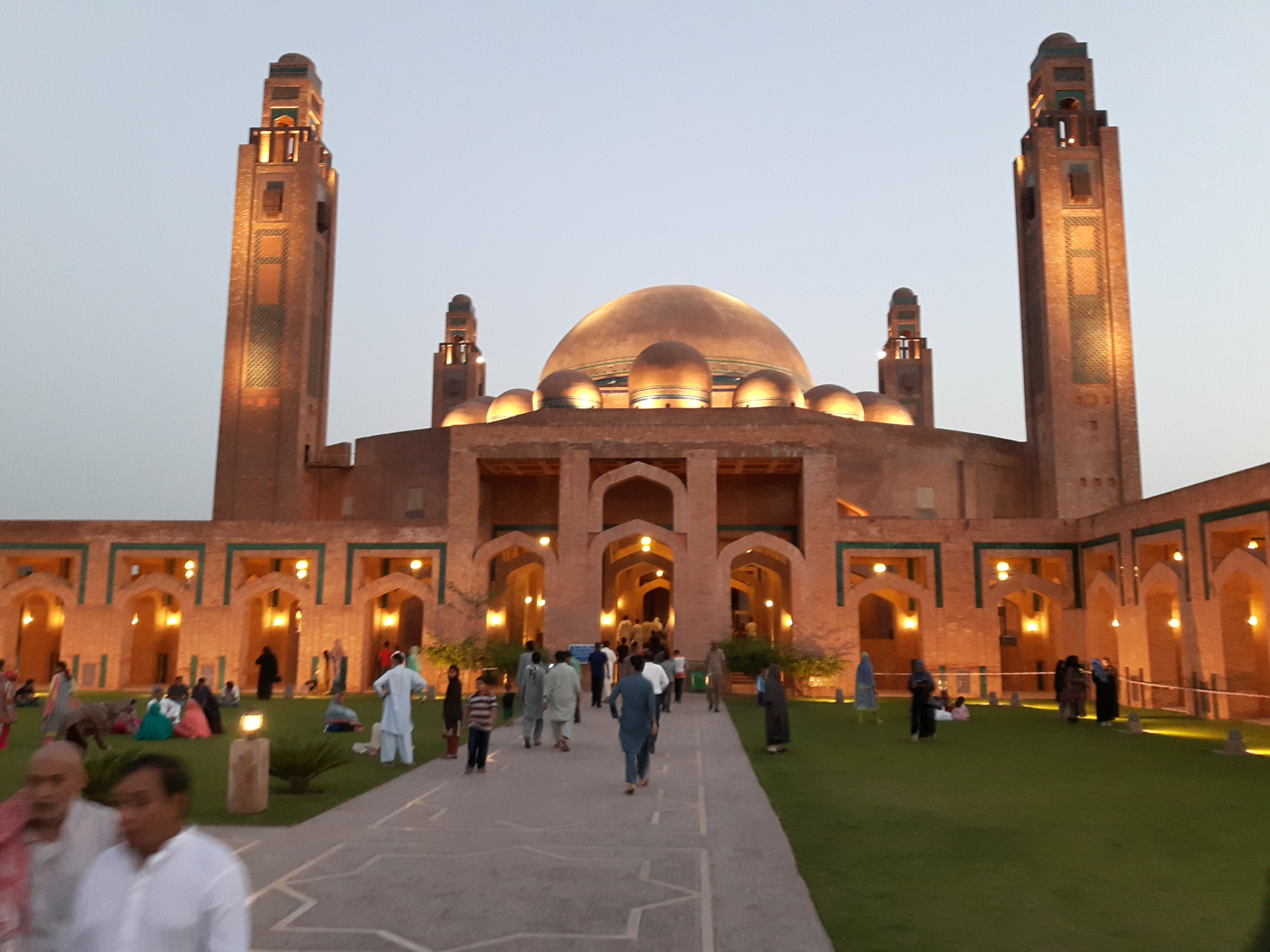
The courtyard and corridor leading to the main halls of the mosque.

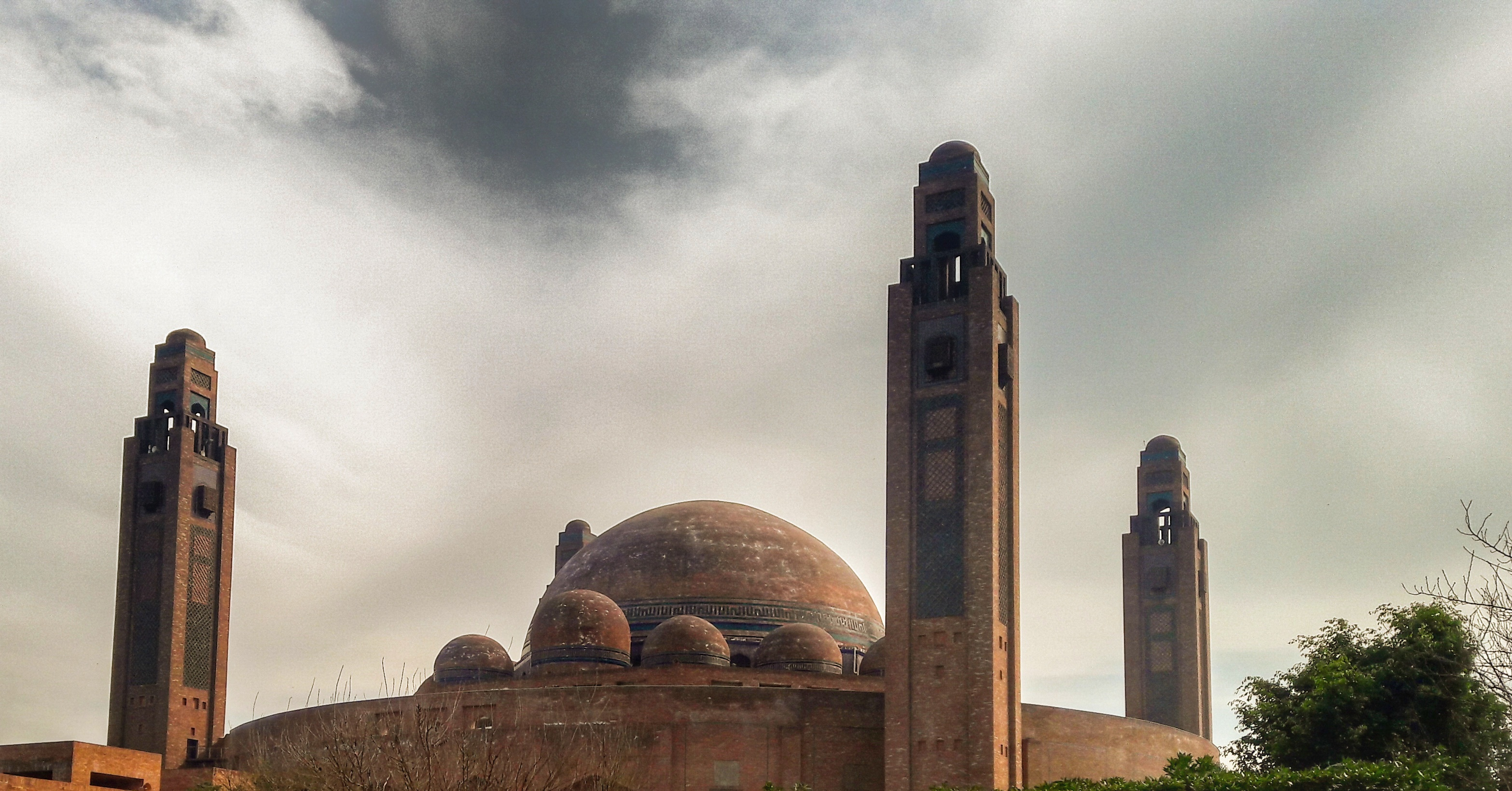
A photo of the mosque captured in the morning.

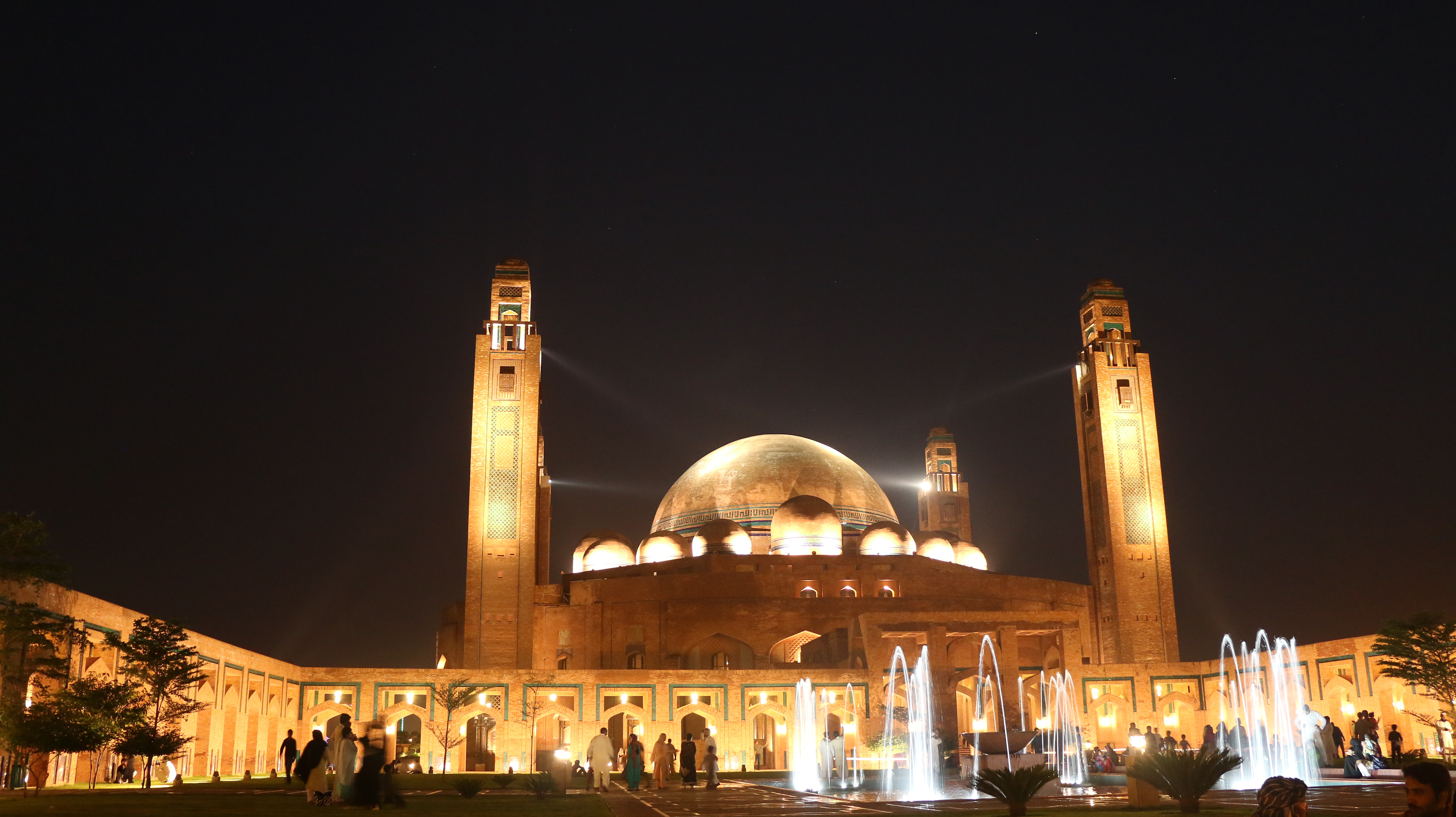
View of the mosque at night.

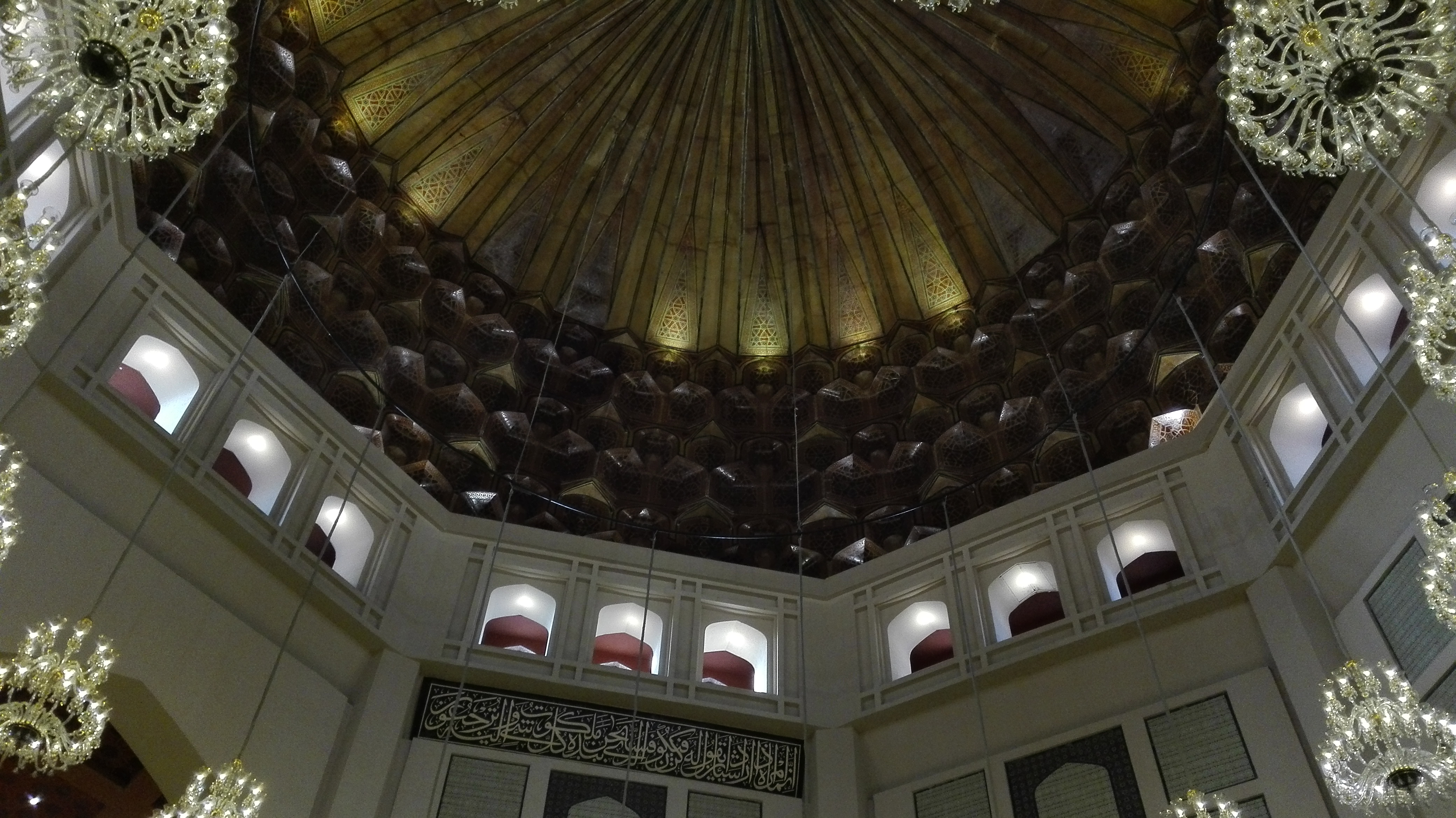
Inside up view of the mosque

== Location Update ==
In 2017, Lahore Development Authority announced Lahore Ring Road extension passing through Bahria Town Lahore in close proximity of the Grand mosque. The project was completed in 2022 and Ring Road's elevated structure is 200 meters away from the mosque.

== See also ==
- Architecture of Lahore
- Wazir Khan Mosque
- Grand Jamia Mosque, Karachi
