= Bahria Town =

Pakistani real-estate development company

Bahria Town (Private) Limited
- Type: Private Limited
- Industry: Real estate, Gated community, Hospitality
- Founded: January 14, 1997; 29 years ago
- Founder: Malik Riaz
- Headquarters: Rawalpindi, Punjab, Pakistan
- Key people: Shaheryar Ahmed Malik Riaz (chairman); Faiz Mohiuddin Malik Riaz (CEO)
- Products: Town; Commercial area Land lot House; Villa; Restaurants; Hotel; Golf clubs Hospitals
- Number of employees: 160,000 (2017)
- Website: bahriatown.com

Bahria Town (Private) Limited (Urdu: بحریہ ٹاؤن) is an Islamabad-based privately employee-owned real-estate development company that owns, develops, and manages properties across Pakistan.

It established its first gated community in Rawalpindi/Islamabad. Its second gated community opened in Lahore. In 2015, it launched Bahria Town Karachi, the largest of its gated communities, while the Bahria Enclave Islamabad (launched in 2013) is the smallest of them. Most of these communities are large towns in their own right; its oldest community in the Southern Rawalpindi/Islamabad area spans over 16,000 hectares (40,000 acres). The under-construction Bahria Town Karachi spans over 16,000 hectares (40,000 acres), making it the largest privately owned residential community in the country.

The companies subsidiaries include the Mall of Lahore and the under-construction Mall of Islamabad, a chain of cinemas under the brand Cine Gold, a chain of supermarkets under the banner of Green Valley Hypermarket and skyscrapers including the Bahria Icon Tower, which is the tallest building in Pakistan. The group is also the developer of Grand Jamia Mosque, Lahore, which is the seventh largest in the world and is constructing the third largest mosque in Karachi. The under-construction Rafi Cricket Stadium, when completed, will also be the largest in the country. In November 2016, Bahria entered into a contract with Hyatt to develop four properties across Pakistan, including two golf resorts, worth a combined $600 million. The properties would be owned by Bahria.

ACE International Academy is also a project of Bahria Town. Bahria projects usually house upper-middle and high-income Pakistanis; these communities have private security, the ability to restrict access to non-residents and are energy independent from the national grid. Bahria gated communities are home to private schools, including those operated by the company, private hospitals, hotels, and commercial avenues. Bahria has been featured by several international news agencies.

== Communities ==
=== Bahria Town Rawalpindi ===
Bahria Town Rawalpindi is the oldest and first project of Malik Riaz. Bahria Town Rawalpindi is mostly located in Rawalpindi, it is sometimes referred to as Bahria Town Islamabad because of it partially being in the Islamabad Capital Territory.

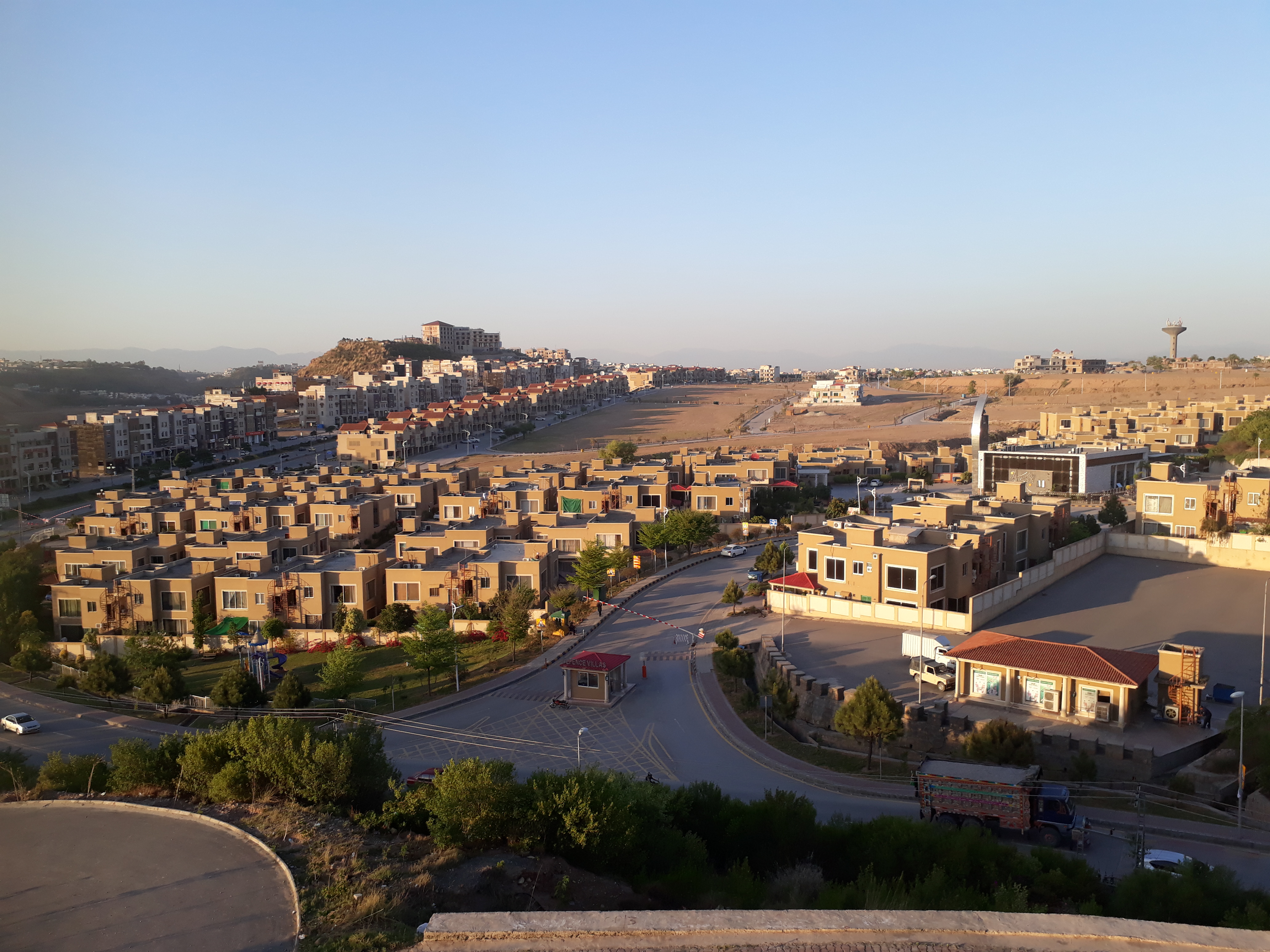
The gated community in Rawalpindi known as Bahria Town Rawalpindi

The original gated community has over 100,000 people and has series of projects. It is divided into various phases and smaller projects. Unlike other housing societies in Pakistan, Bahria produces its own electricity and sells it to its residents through the Bahria Town Electric Supply Company. Bahria Town projects in Rawalpindi and Lahore were running respectively 12 and 9 megawatts of generation units of their own. Bahria Town also has constructed 3 grid stations with its own resources and also provides underground lines to its residents.

=== Bahria Enclave Islamabad ===
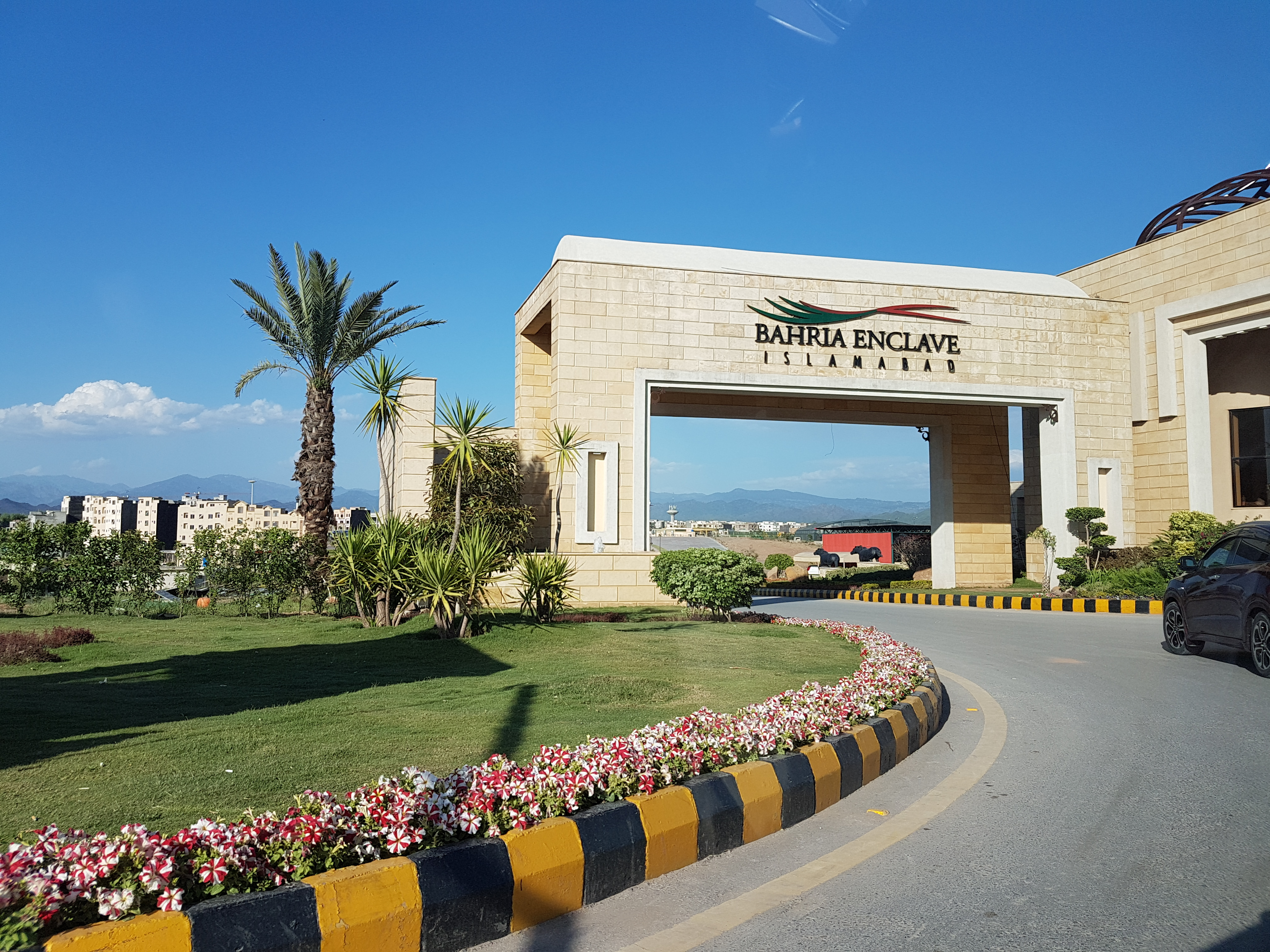
Bahria Enclave

Bahria Enclave is a housing scheme launched by Bahria Town in July 2011. It is located approximately 8 km from Chak Shahzad, the Park Road, and the Kuri Road, with access from Srinagar Highway, Lehtrar Road, and Islamabad Highway. On January 31, 2012, Capital Development Authority approved the plan for development of Jinnah Avenue in Zone-IV. The construction project of four-lane road would link main Kuri Road to Kuri Model Village and was awarded to Bahria Town.

=== Bahria Town Lahore ===
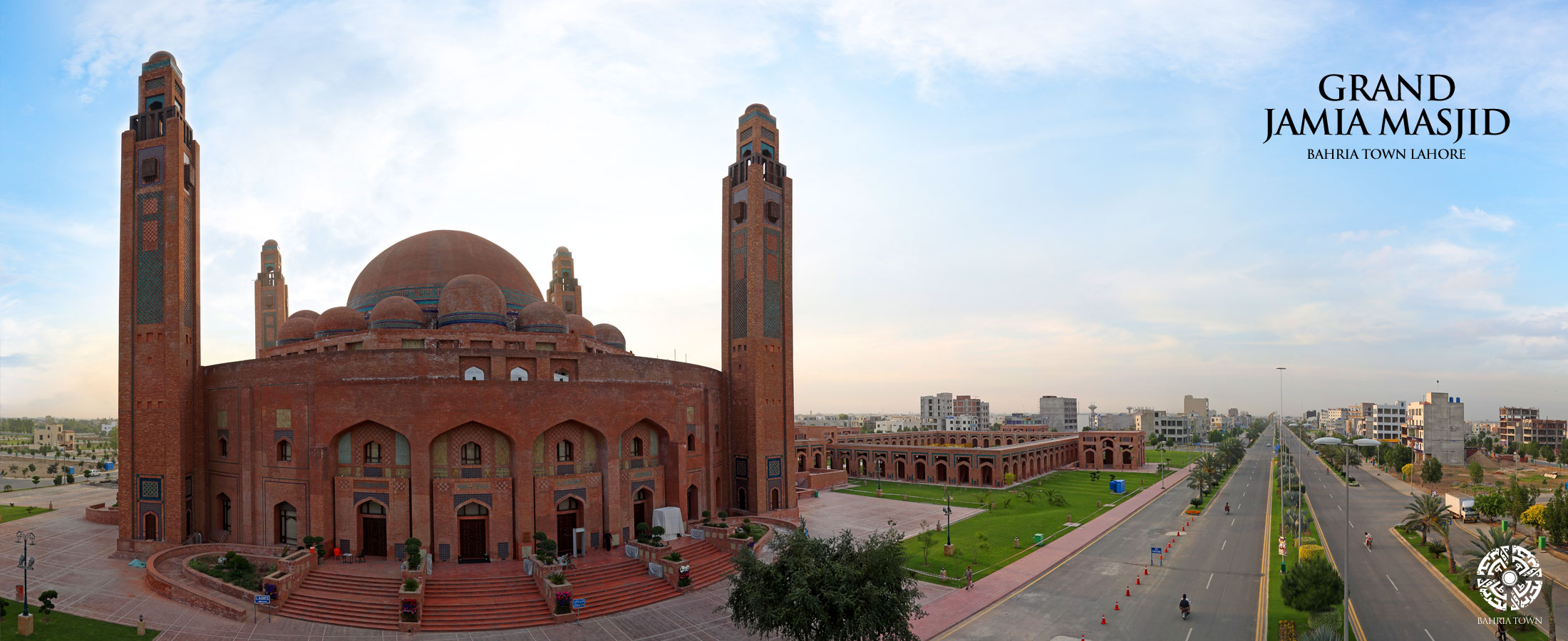
Grand Jamia Masjid, Bahria Town Lahore

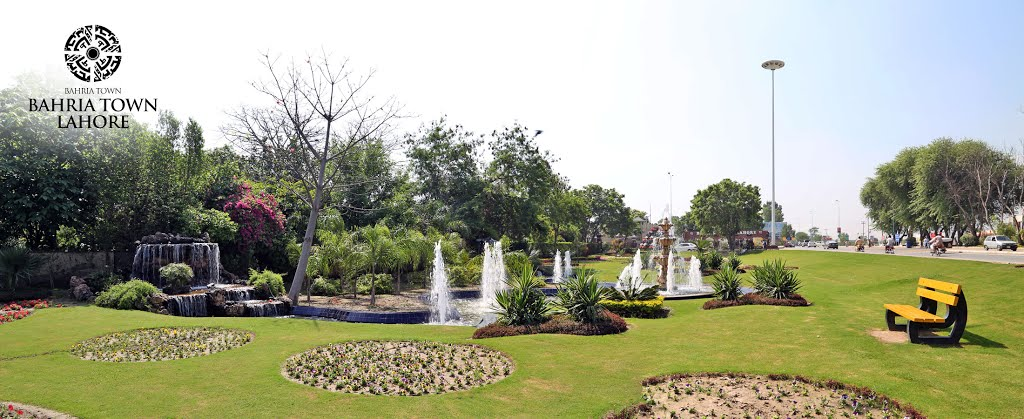
Bahria Town entrance at Canal Bank Road, Lahore

Bahria Town Lahore is a flagship gated community in Lahore. The community is home to the Grand Jamia Mosque, Lahore which is the seventh largest mosque in the world which has a total capacity of 70,000 people.

=== Bahria Town Karachi ===
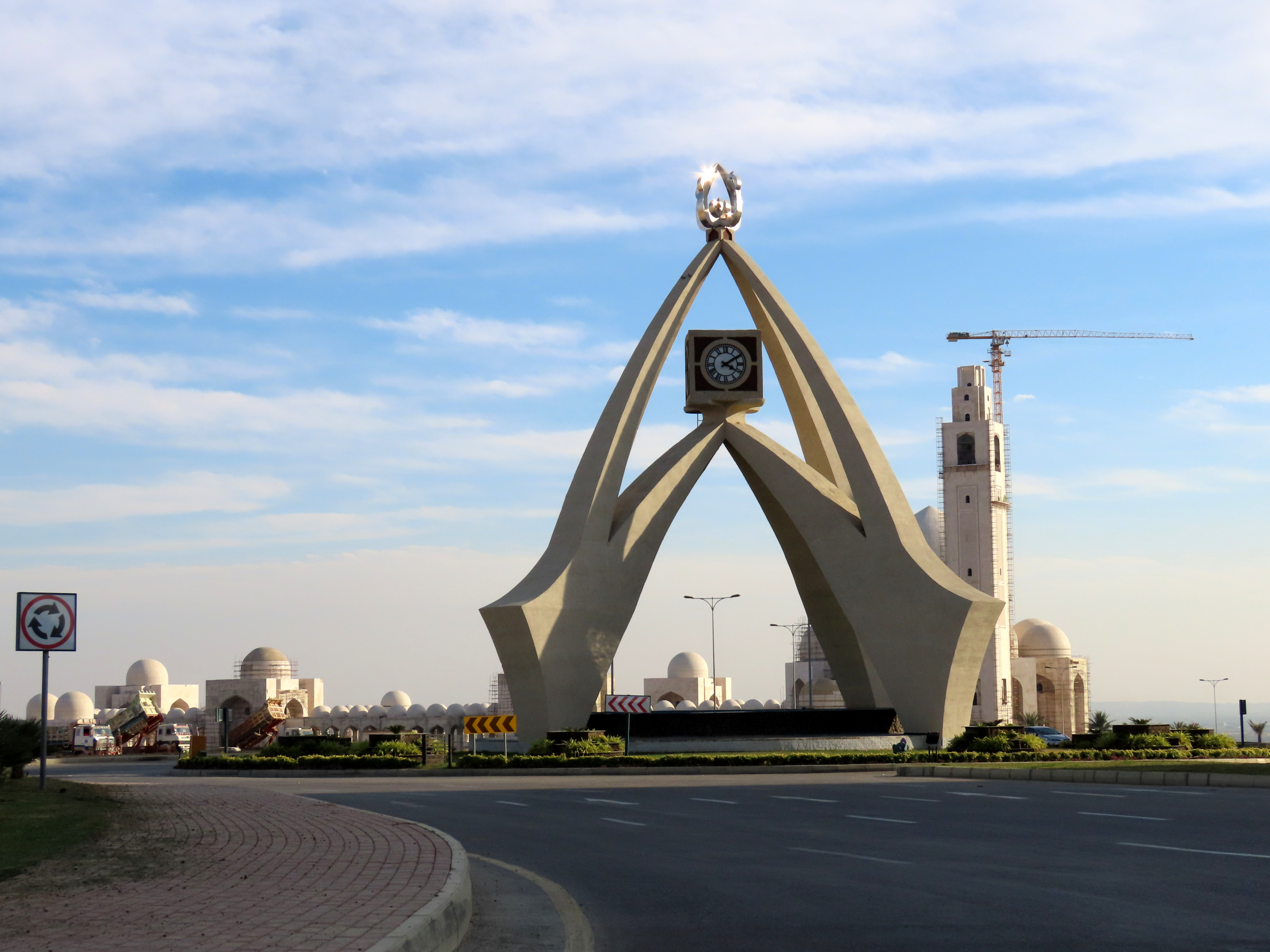
Allah Roundabout in Bahria Town Karachi

Bahria Town Karachi is a privately developed, gated community located northeast of Karachi, Pakistan, along the M-9 Motorway. Covering an area of 46,000 acres (72 sq mi; 19,000 ha), it is one of the largest private real estate developments in Pakistan, undertaken by the Bahria Town Group since 2014.

=== Bahria Town Nawabshah (Shaheed Benazirabad) ===
Bahria Town Nawabshah (Urdu: بحریہ ٹاؤن نوابشاہ) is a currently constructed privately owned gated community of Benazirabad, Sindh, Pakistan.

The location of Bahria Town Nawabshah is to be located at Qazi Abdullah Road, on the bank of Rohri Canal, Nawabshah.

== Shopping malls ==
Shopping Malls	Information
Mall of Lahore	60,000 m^{2} (650,000 sq ft) commercial space, houses over 70 stores
Mall of Islamabad	Under-construction mixed-use high rise 25-story tower in Blue Area, Islamabad
Mall of Karachi	Located within the Bahria Icon Tower in Karachi.

== Skyscrapers ==
Name	Height	Details	Timeline
Bahria Icon Tower	300 m (980 ft) (62 floors)		Tallest building in Pakistan, based on a 1.45-hectare plot in Clifton. Topped out
Opal 225, Karachi	45 floors	Mixed use development, include apartments, office spaces, shopping mall and a five star hotel, Le Meridian Karachi. Services by RWDI.	End of 2019
Hoshang Pearl, Karachi	130 meters tall (31 floors)	Residential tower.	2019
Mall of Islamabad	25 floor	Mixed-use high rise 25-story tower in Blue Area, Islamabad.	Topped out
Bahria Town Tower, Karachi	84 m (275 ft) (24 floors)	Mixed-use, includes shopping mall and apartments.	Complete in 2017

== Hospitality ==
On November 14, 2016, Hyatt Hotels Corporation and Bahria Town Group entered into an agreement in Abu Dhabi to develop four properties in Pakistan worth over $600 million. All properties are under construction as of 2016.

Property	Details
Grand Hyatt Islamabad	400 guestrooms with 18-hole golf course located within Bahria Golf City designed by Beame Architectural Partnership.
Hyatt Regency Karachi	200 guestrooms golf resort with Pakistan's first night-lit 36-hole golf located within Bahria Town Karachi
Hyatt Regency Lahore	220 guestrooms hotel under-construction in Lahore.
Hyatt Regency Islamabad	165-bed hotel in Bahria Town Islamabad with 11,000 square feet of flexible meeting and event space.

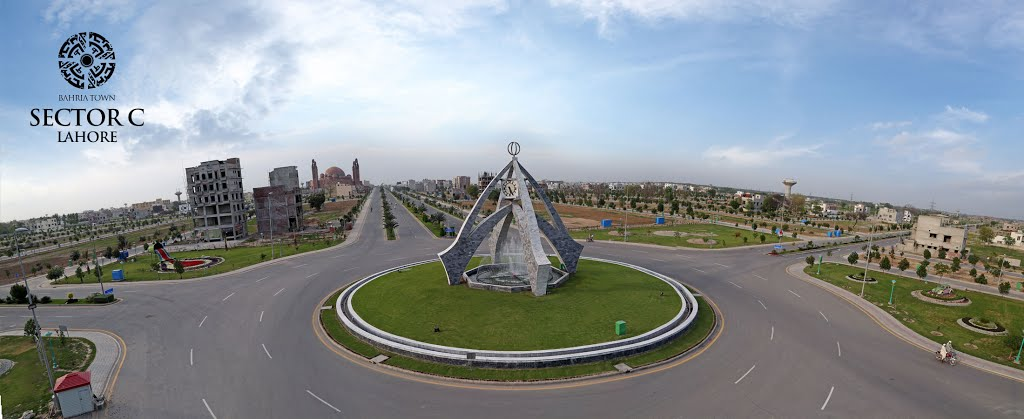
Clock Tower Bahria Town Lahore

== Recognition and awards ==
After success at the national level, Bahria has been featured by international magazines and news agencies, referred to as the prosperous face of Pakistan. GlobalPost claimed that in 2013, Bahria houses some 100,000 people in total. Newsweek calls it as Pakistan's "Gateway to Paradise". On October 6, 2011, Los Angeles Times referred to Bahria as a "functioning state within a non-functioning one". Regardless of that Bahria has been subject to controversies, it is referred to as a symbol of inequality, blamed for illegal encroachment of forests and unholy alliances with the military.

== Controversies ==
Bahria has been subject to controversies; it is referred to as a symbol of inequality and blamed for illegal encroachment of forests.

To begin with, the name 'Bahria' itself has been controversial, and in 2018, a senior court in Pakistan ruled against the use of this name by the private owners of the project. Ayesha Siddiqa, a civilian military analyst and author of Military Inc.: Inside Pakistan's Military Economy, alleges that those links have allowed him to acquire land, in some cases returning a percentage to senior officers as developed plots. Chief Executive of Bahria Town, Ali Riaz Malik, has submitted his statement regarding Arsalan Iftikhar (son of Chief Justice of Pakistan Iftikhar Muhammad Chaudhry) suo moto case in the Supreme Court of Pakistan that Bahria Town was not behind any allegations against Arsalan and that the court's proceedings were not aimed at investigating the affairs of Bahria Town. The written reply also said that if any statement were made against Bahria Town or against its administration, then the organization would have the right to respond to it.

In April 2016, Malik Riaz Hussain's son, Ahmed Ali Riaz Malik, was named in the Panama Papers.

=== Dispute with Nayatel and CCP fine ===
In August 2016, a complaint from a resident of Bahria Town was forwarded to the Competition Commission of Pakistan (CCP) which revealed that Bahria Town was deliberately preventing other fixed-line service providers from expanding into Bahria Town, and thus giving PTCL the majority of the market share in the housing society. It was also in violation of the Competition Act (2010) by abusing its dominant position and entering into a prohibited agreement.

Six months later, CCP imposed a fine on Bahria Town of 2 million PKR for deliberately not issuing a NOC (No-Objection Certificate) to Nayatel in Phases 1 to 6.

Bahria Town has been directed to work with Nayatel to lay its fiber optic network in Phases 1 to 6.

== See also ==
- List of largest companies in Pakistan
- Developments in Islamabad
