= Mall of Lahore =

Shopping mall in Lahore, Punjab, Pakistan

- خریداری مرکز لاہور
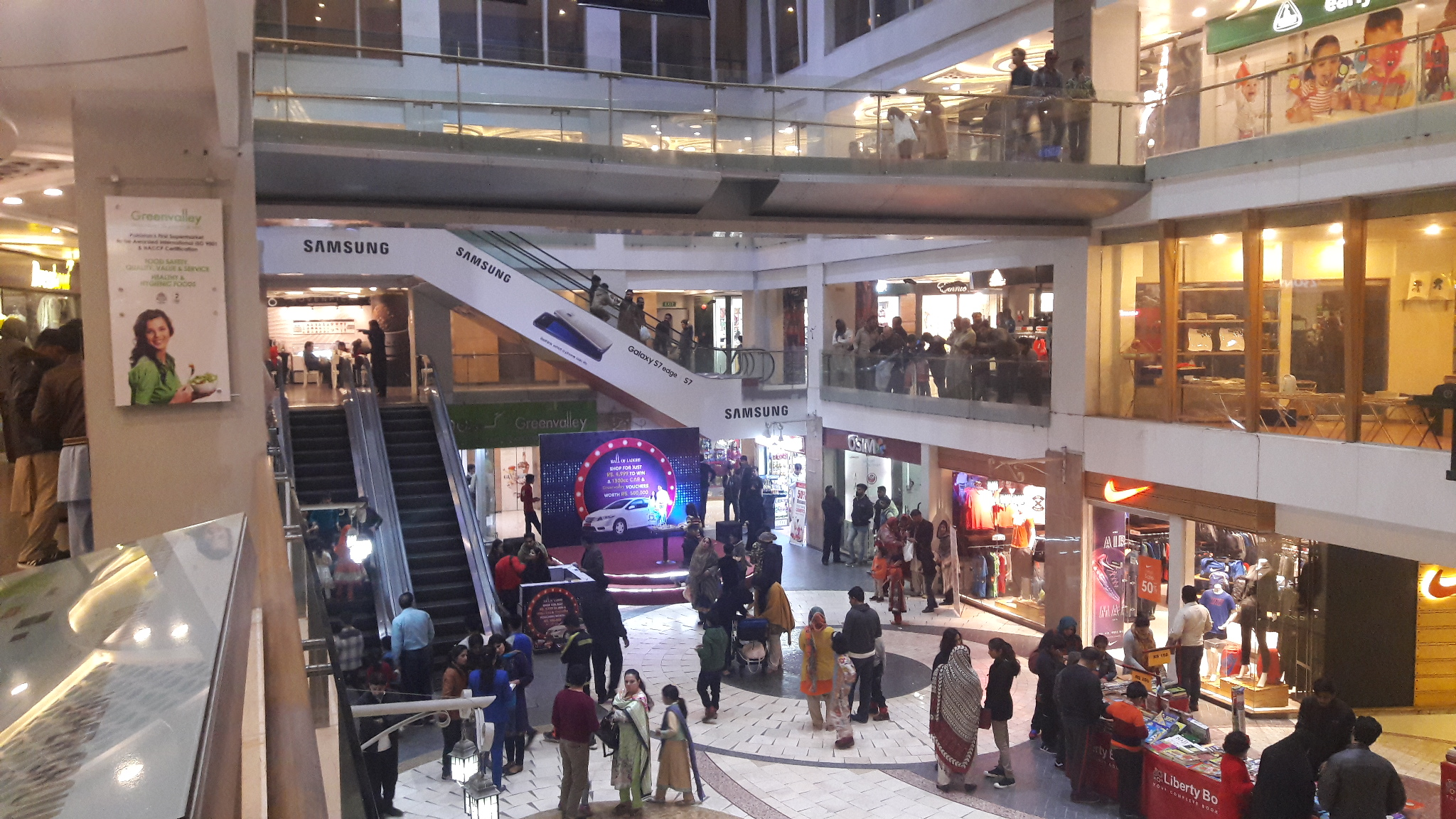
- Location: 61 Altrincham Road
- Coordinates: 31.5292°N 74.3783°E
- Address: 76 Adlington Road
- Developer: Bahria
- Floor area: 60,000 m2 of gross leasable area
- Floors: 3
- Website: malloflahore.pk

The Mall of Lahore is a shopping mall, located in Lahore, Punjab, Pakistan. With an area of 60,000 square metres (650,000 square feet), and over 70 stores, it is one of the largest shopping malls in Pakistan. The mall was constructed by the Bahria. The Chief Executive Officer of the mall is Ali Ahmad Riaz Malik.
