= Bahria Town Lahore =

Bahria بحریہ
- Gated community
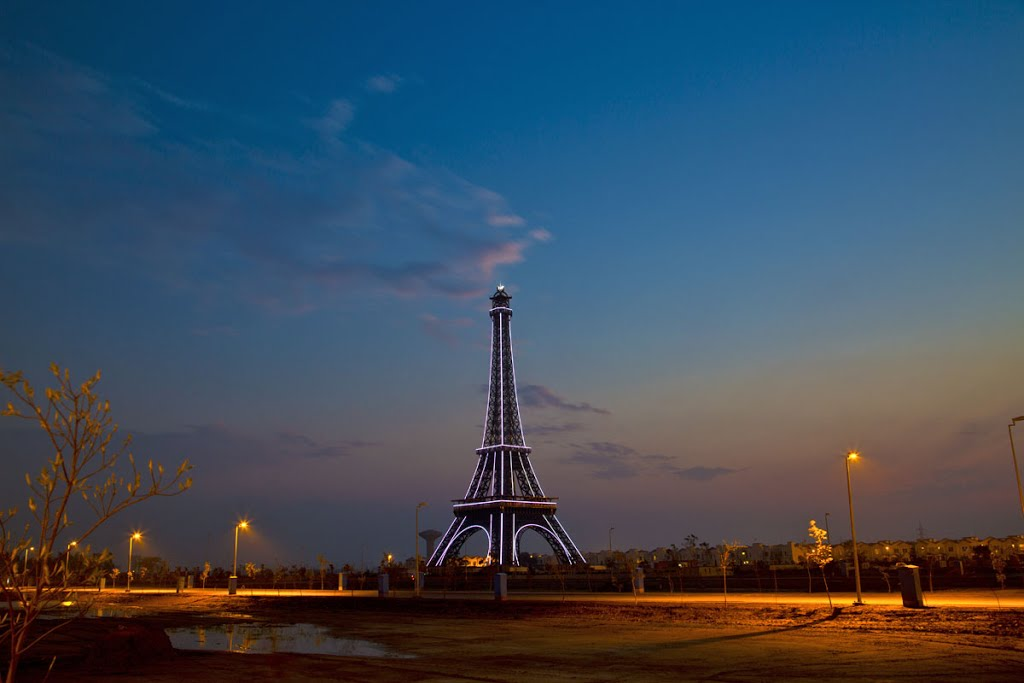
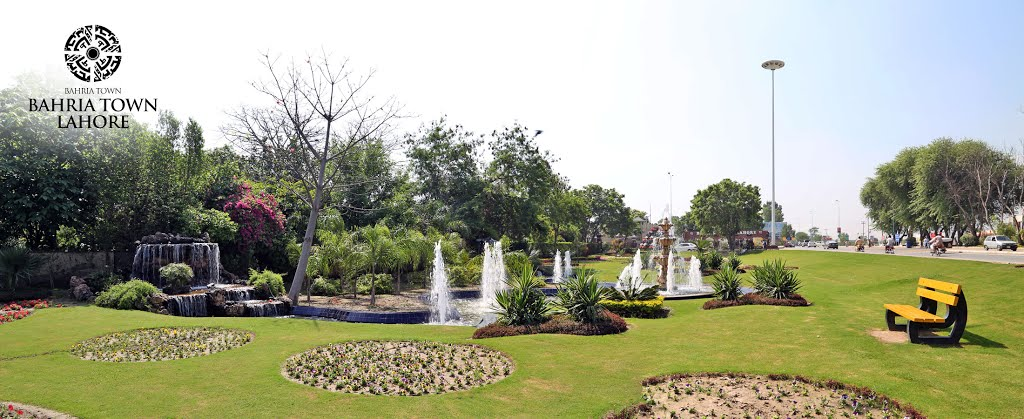
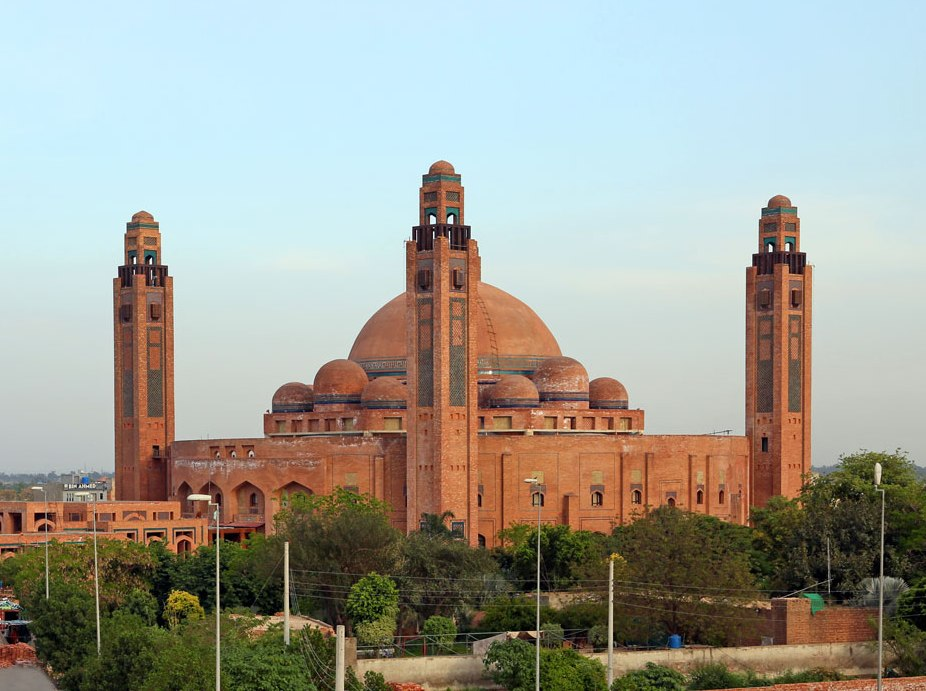
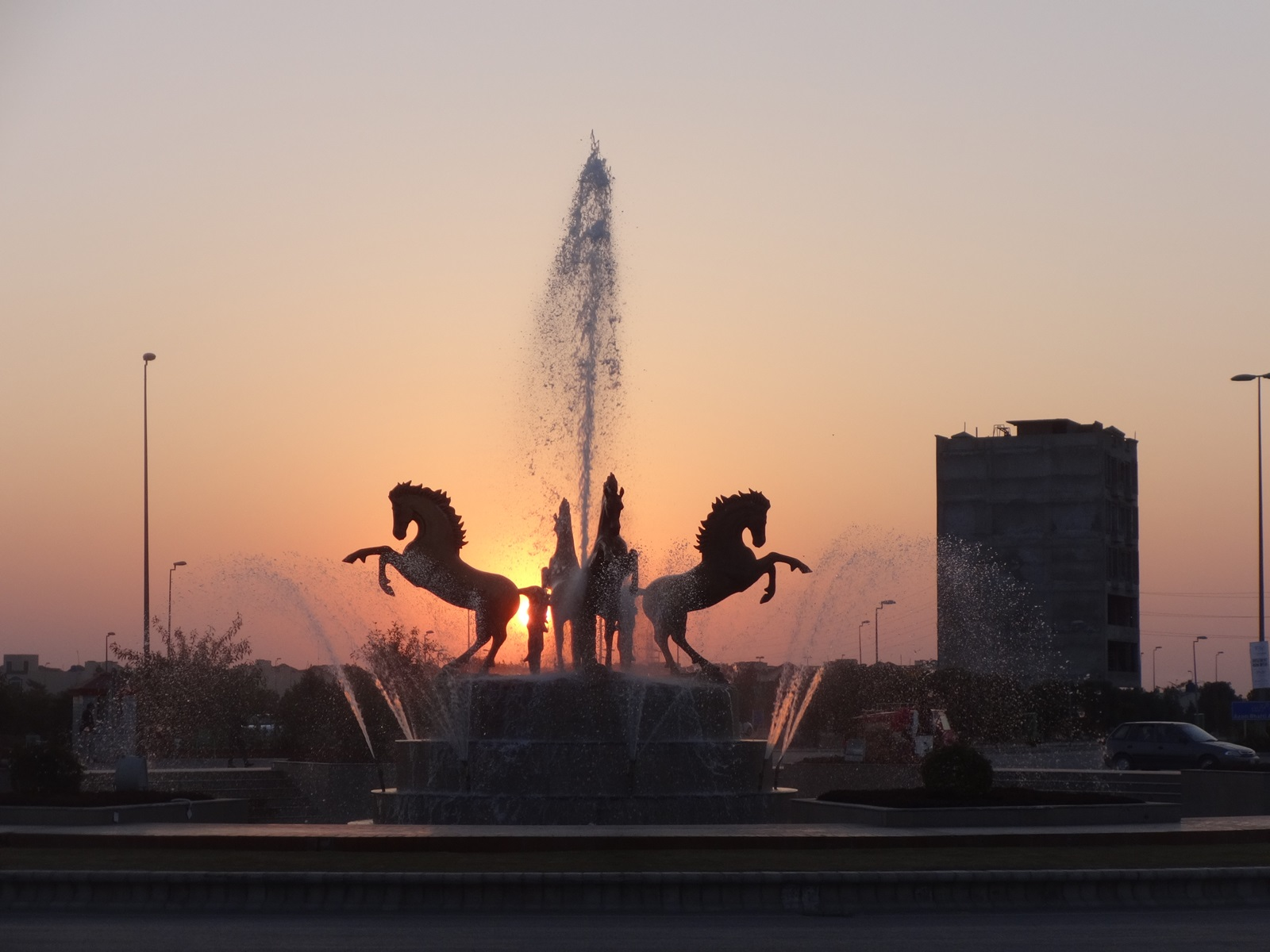
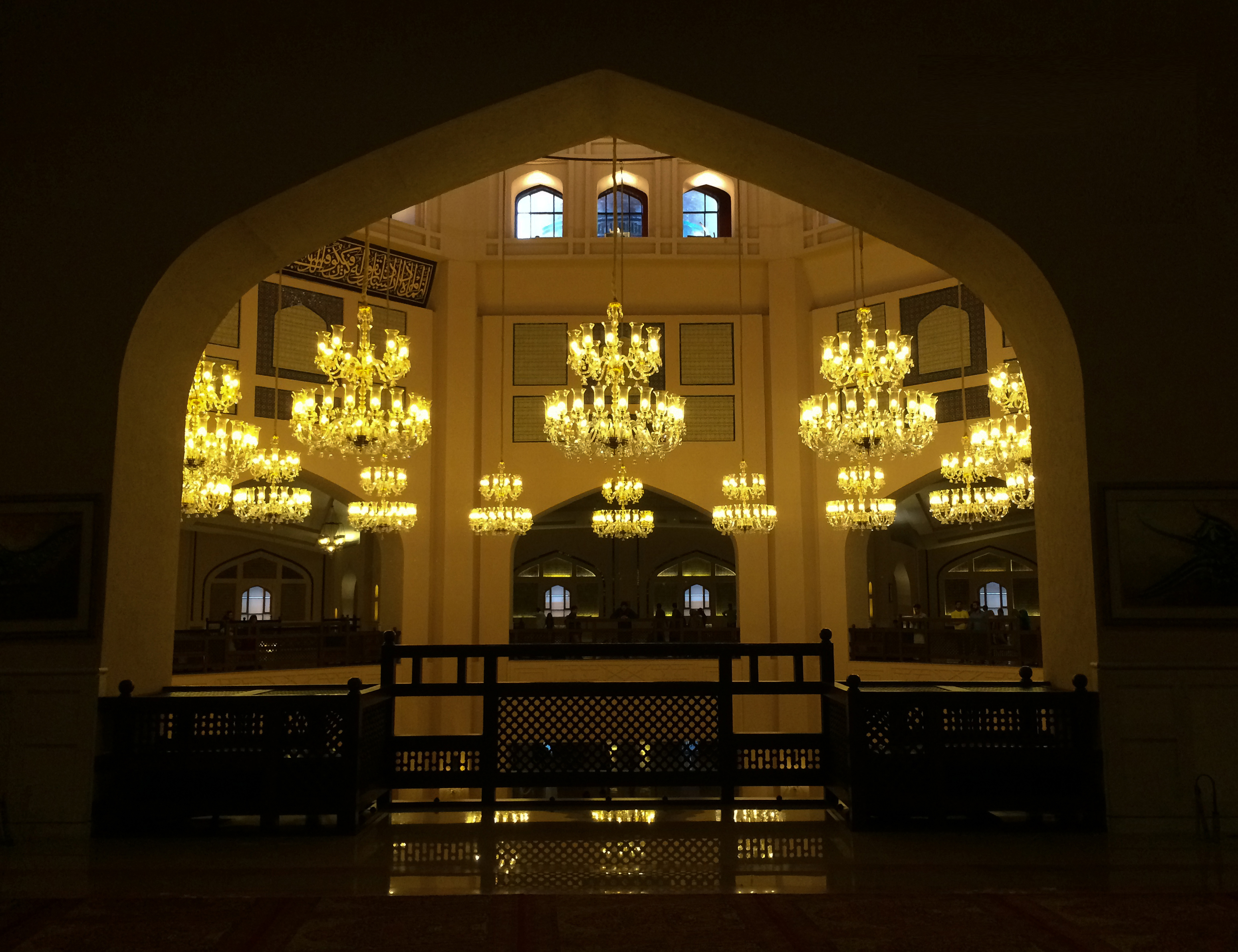
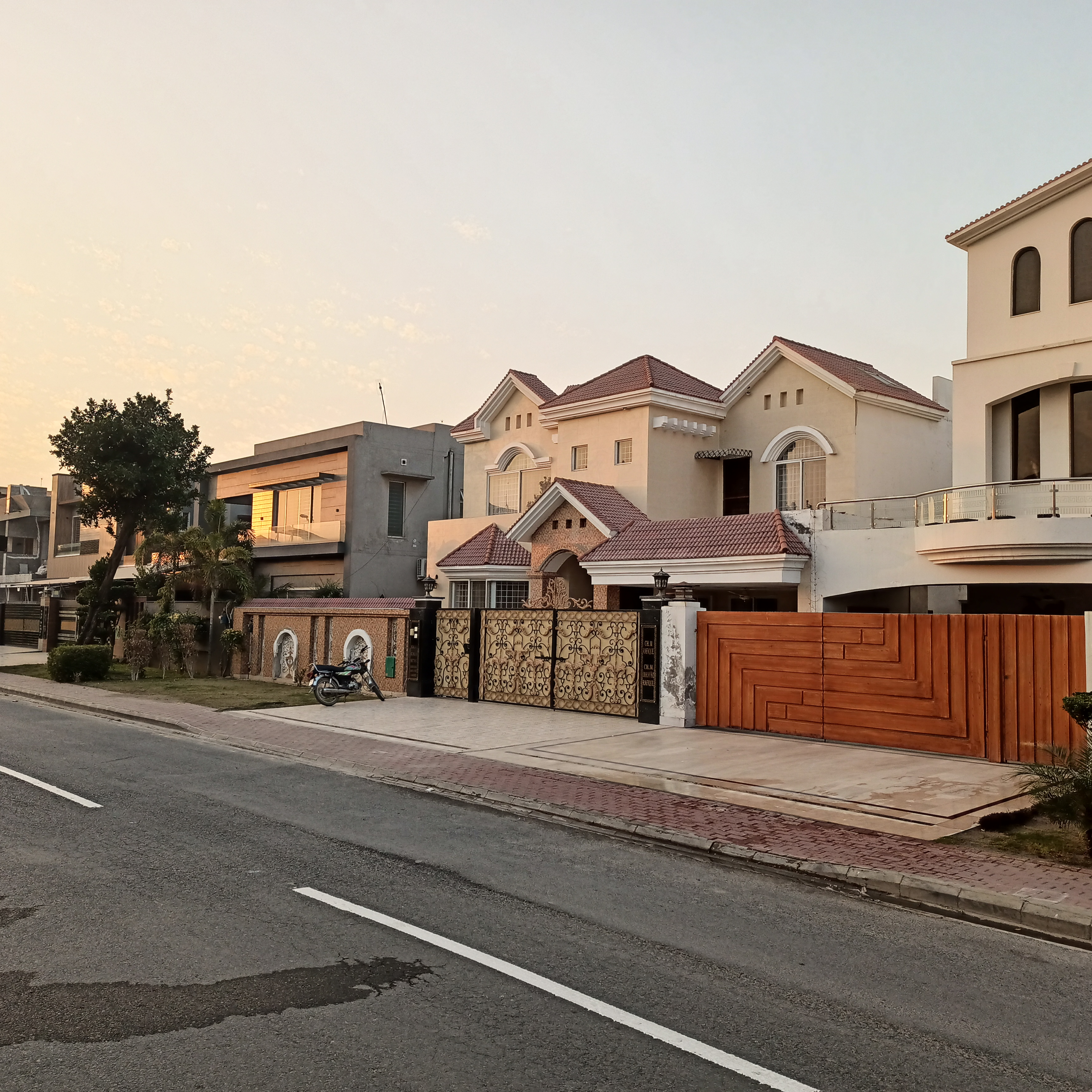
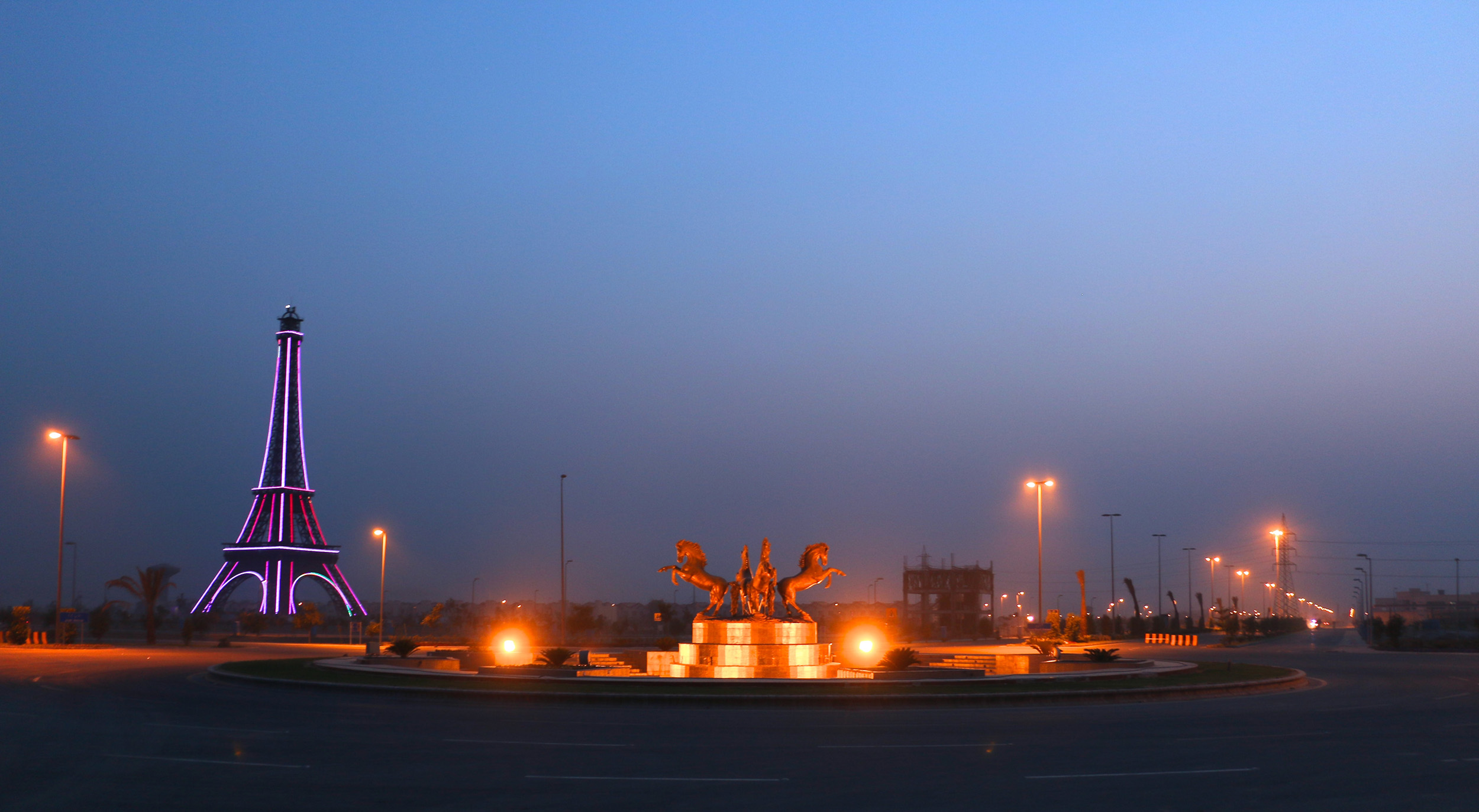
- Country: Pakistan
- Province: Punjab
- City: Lahore
- Tehsil: Raiwind
- Union council: 31 (Maraka)
- Website: www.bahriatown.com

Bahria Town Lahore (Punjabi, Urdu: بحریہ ٹاؤن لاہور) is a privately owned gated community located within union council 31 (Maraka) in Raiwind Tehsil of Lahore in Punjab, Pakistan.

The suburb was developed and is owned by the Bahria Town Group. It is known for its safety and infrastructure and it also features a replica of Eiffel Tower.

Bahria Town of Lahore is mostly dominated by the educated families of Punjabis and Muhajirs.

== Gallery ==
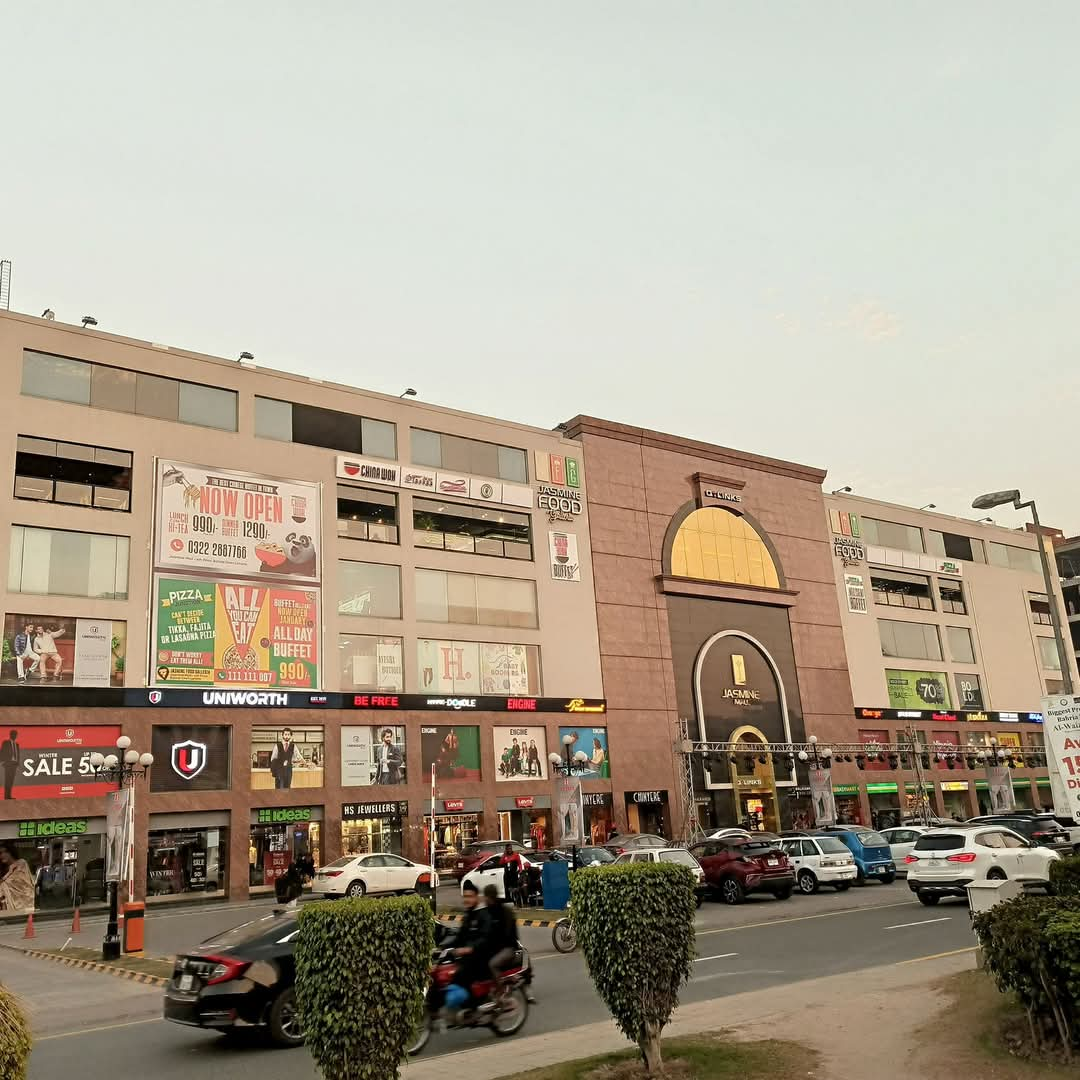
Jasmine Mall (جیسمین مال)

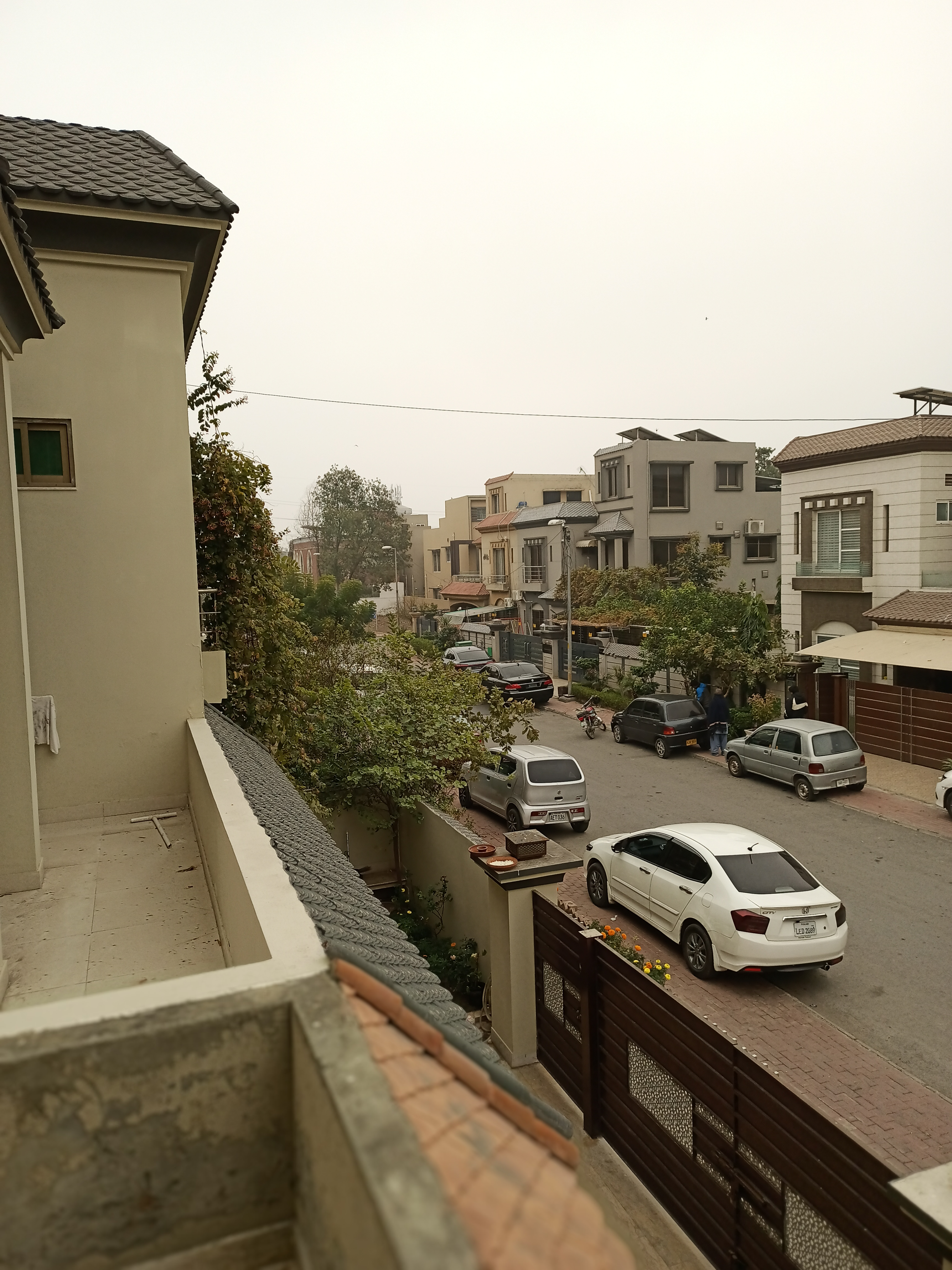
Iris Block (آئرس بلاک)

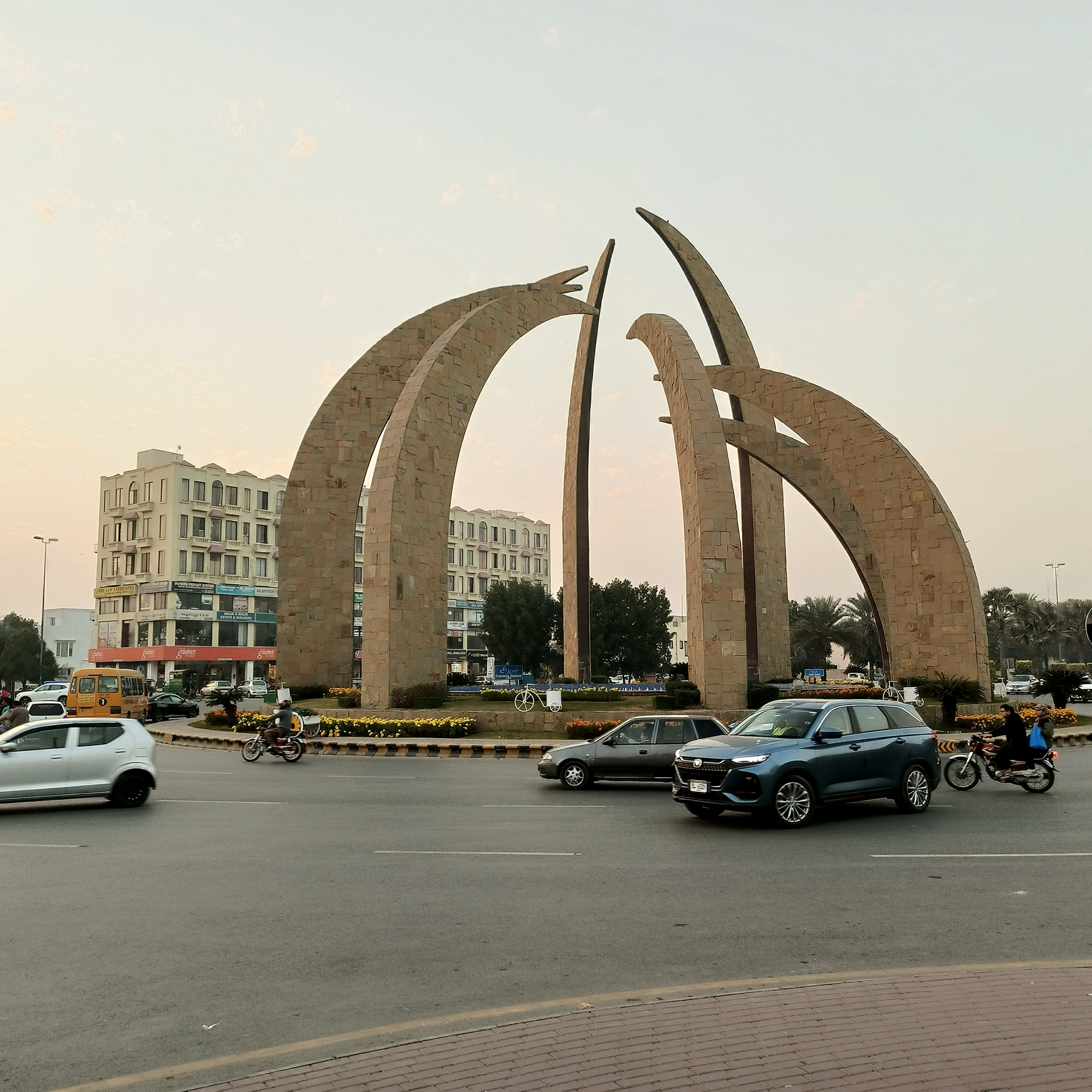
Talwar Chowk (تلوار چوک)

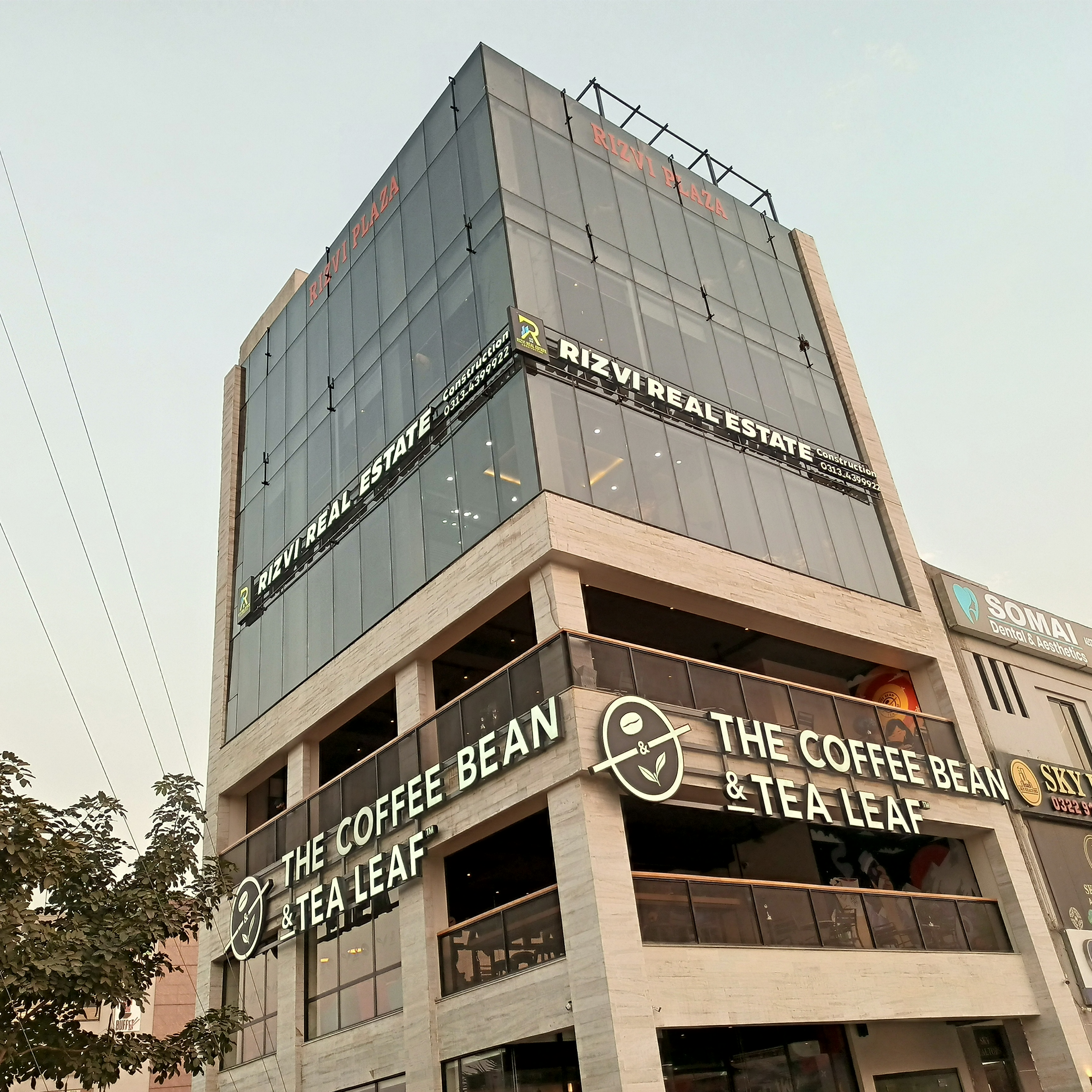

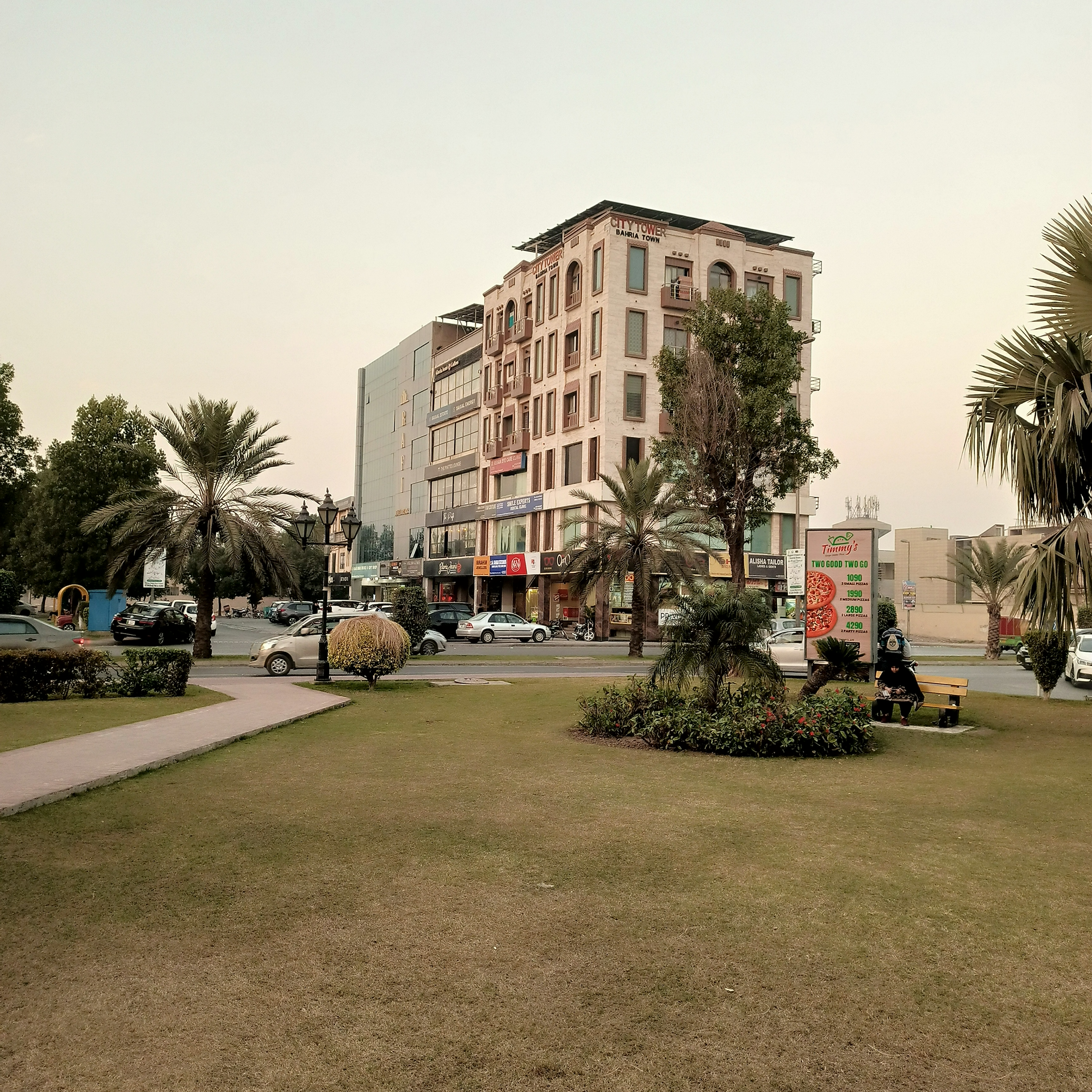

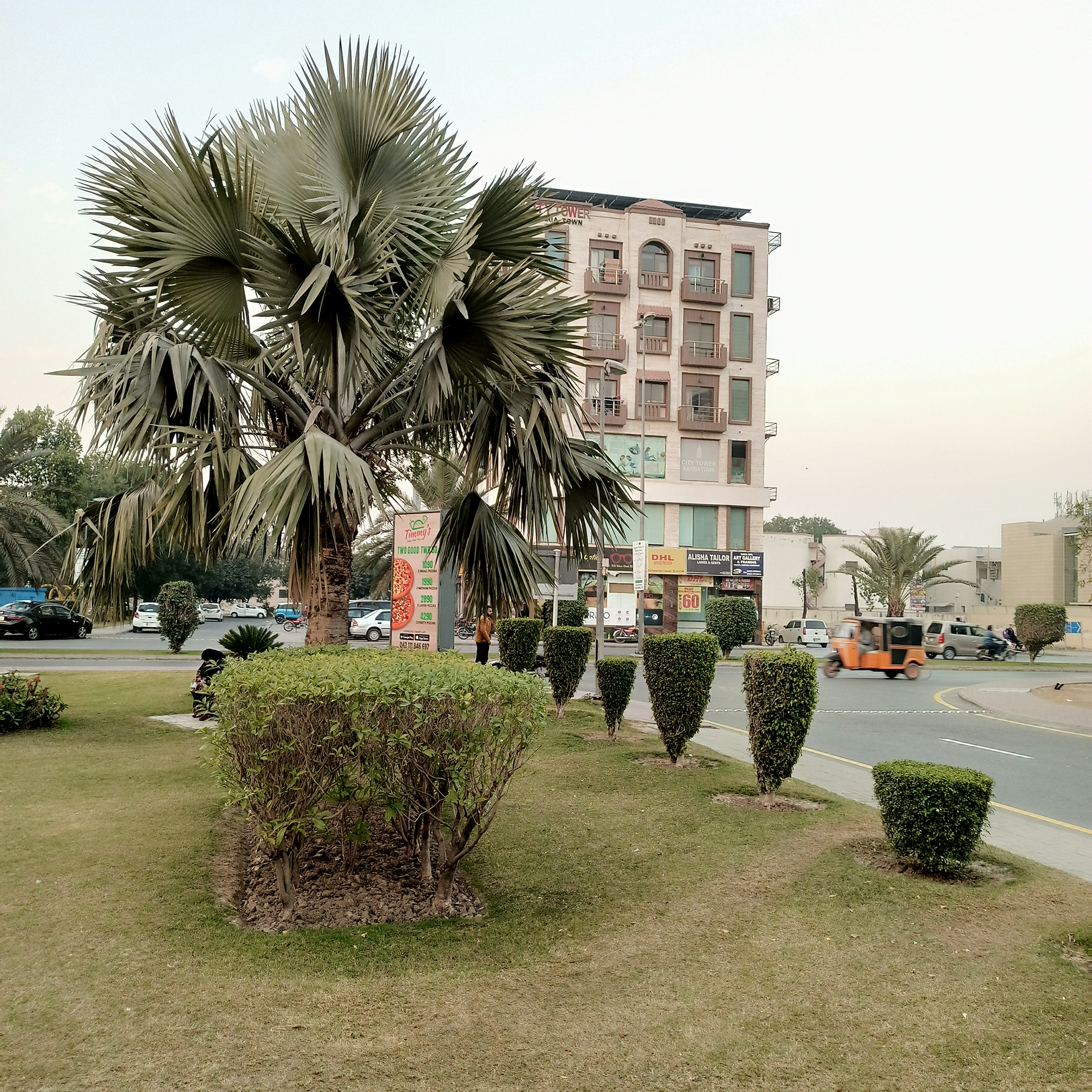

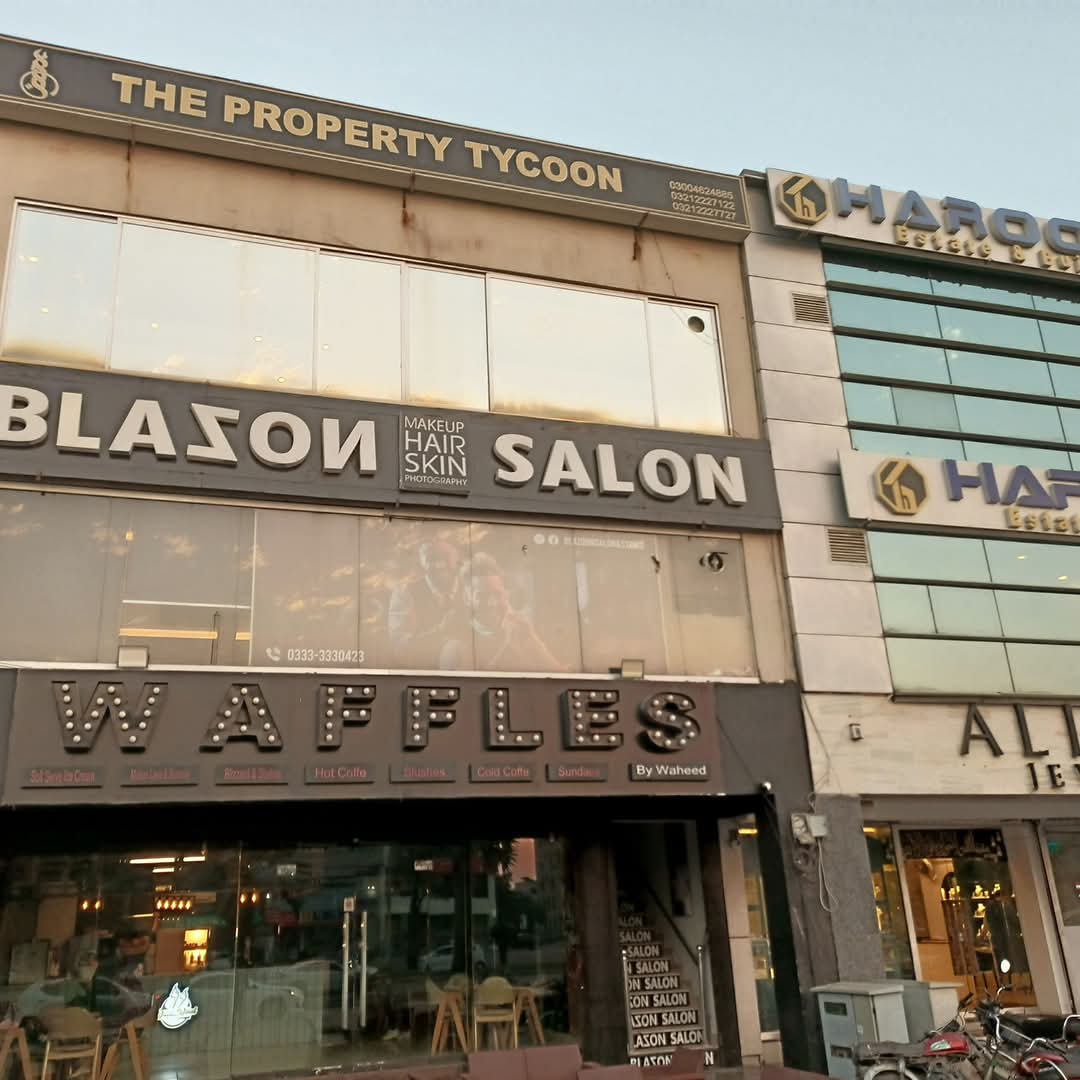
