= Malik Riaz =

Pakistani businessman (born 1954)

- Born: February 8, 1954 (age 72); Sialkot, Punjab, Pakistan
- Occupations: Founder of Bahria Town and Defence Housing Authority
- Organization(s): Bahria Town; Defence Housing Authority
- Spouse: Beena Riaz
- Children: 5

Malik Riaz Hussain (Urdu: ملک ریاض حسین; born February 8, 1954) is a Pakistani businessman and real estate tycoon who is the founder and chairman of Bahria Town one of the largest privately owned real estate development companies in Asia.

Riaz develops gated communities, including Bahria Town Karachi, Bahria Town Lahore, Bahria Town Islamabad, Rawalpindi, and Defence Housing Authority, Karachi.

He has also financed the construction of some of Pakistan's largest mosques including the Grand Jamia Mosque in Lahore, the Lal Masjid in Islamabad and the Grand Jamia Mosque in Karachi, which is projected to become the world's third-largest mosque upon completion.

== Early life ==
Malik Riaz was born to a private contractor who was fairly wealthy. However, his father's business failed, forcing Riaz to drop out of high school after completing his matriculation. He went on to work as a clerk with the Military Engineering Service and often worked part-time as a painter. He later moved to become a contractor in the military.

In 1995, Riaz established his own construction company under the name Hussain Global. Within the same year, his company signed an agreement with Pakistan's Navy charitable trust in order to build a gated community for the Pakistan Navy.

In 2000, the Pakistan Navy ended its business arrangement with Malik Riaz. After this, he established his own real estate development company which, the Supreme Court ruled in his favor, allowing his company to continue using it.

== Business ==
Riaz started his career as a clerk with a construction company(MES) in Rawalpindi. In the 1980s, Riaz moved to become a contractor, and in 1995 Riaz's construction company Hussain Global, signed an agreement with Pakistan Navy's charitable trust known as Bahria Foundation to develop a gated community for Pakistan Navy.

After Malik Riaz`s contract with the military ended, the Navy's Bahria Foundation issued a legal notice to Riaz to stop using such words as Bahria/Maritime/Navy for his company's construction projects. However, in 2001, the Supreme Court ruled in Riaz’s favor and allowed him to continue using the word “Bahria”.

Malik Riaz has expanded his business empire under the brand name of Bahria Town Group and Defence Housing Authority.

Riaz is considered as a liberal in his business practices. According to Dr. Ayesha Siddiqa "to think that he is defined by religiosity and traditionalism, however, would be a mistake. His employees' profiles show that he hires a lot of women, especially at the middle and senior management levels, because he finds them "hard-working, efficient, and diligent".

== Controversies ==
In 2012 Malik Riaz Hussain provided evidence in court proceedings against Arsalan Iftikhar Chaudhry, son of the former Chief Justice of Pakistan Iftikhar Muhammad Chaudhry. In his affidavit, Riaz said he had been "blackmailed" by the Chief Justice's son for cash and other gifts, and that warnings to the Chief Justice about his son’s activities had gone unheeded for months. Arsalan Iftikhar Chaudhry subsequently resigned from his post as Vice Chairman of Balochistan Board of Investment.

Malik Riaz Hussain, the Chairman of Bahria Town Pvt. Ltd., has been at the center of some controversies and allegations. The allegations are mostly that he pays to get things done his way. An expert from pakistanherald.com states that "National Accountability Bureau (NAB) is currently looking into another application filed by a former military officer Lt-Col (retired) Tariq Kamal Khan, which states that the land on which Bahria town is constructed, and is further expanding, was not acquired through legal means. It is alleged that Hussain has strong ties with Pakistan’s military which assisted him in building a huge empire. Some claims go as far as saying that a handful of the important serving army officers, bureaucrats and lawyers are practically on Hussain’s payroll."

In October 2019, the parents of Amanda Halse, one of the 20 victims of the Schoharie limousine crash in the U.S. state of New York a year earlier, named Riaz as a defendant in a wrongful death suit they filed over the accident, since they allege that he had helped finance the businesses of two distant relatives who were principals in the company that owned and operated the limousine.

== UK court settlement ==
After being alerted by Pakistani authorities to sources of his income and cash expenditure, the UK's National Crime Agency (NCA) began an investigation into Malik Riaz Hussain. In December 2018, £20M was frozen by the UK High Court under the Proceeds of Crime Act 2002. By August 2019, a total of nine court orders were in place, enabling UK authorities to hold £140M. All of the court orders were made against the assets and cash, and not their actual or beneficial owner. In December 2019, Malik Riaz came to a civil agreement with the NCA, handing over £140M in cash, and the Grade II listed house 1 Hyde Park Place, valued at £50 million.

The NCA commented that the multimillion-pound settlement did “not represent a finding of guilt”. Control of the £190M of assets and cash will be returned under a UK High Court order to the Pakistani Authorities, who have advised that they will ask the UK Courts to sell any assets and return the sum in cash. The amount was transferred to the account set up by Supreme Court for the recovery of 460 billion rupees fine imposed on Bahria Town in a separate case, going towards the reimbursement of the fine.

== Personal life ==
Riaz married Beena Riaz and they have one son and four daughters. This is the second marriage of Malik Riaz, his first wife died when he was young. Malik Riaz's son, Ahmed Ali Riaz, was born in 1978 and currently holds the position of CEO of Bahria Town.

== Philanthropy ==
=== Bahria Dastarkhwan ===
Malik Riaz established the Bahria Dastarkhwan initiative with the aim of reducing hunger in Pakistan. The initiative has centers across the country and daily provides free meals twice a day to everyone who visits Bahria Dastarkhwan.

=== Healthcare ===
Malik Riaz is in the process of setting up a chain of hospitals in Pakistan that would provide a free healthcare service. Each month he donates Rs. 9.7 million to the healthcare system which includes free medical treatment for the underprivileged, medical equipment for hospitals and food for the patients and their families.

=== Education ===
Malik Riaz built a net of schools, universities, and other institutions that give the students an opportunity to study for free. Every year, Malik Riaz provides students with microfinance loans, enabling them to pursue their academic dreams without financial burden.
