= Grand Jamia Mosque =

Grand Jamia Mosque may refer to:

- Grand Jamia Mosque, Karachi
- Grand Jamia Mosque, Lahore
