= Rafi Cricket Stadium =

Pakistani cricket stadium

- رفیع کرکٹ اسٹیڈیم
- Interactive map of Rafi Cricket Stadium
- Location: Karachi, Sindh, Pakistan
- Coordinates: 25°7′35.9″N 67°21′34.1″E
- Owner: Bahria Town Group; Pakistan Cricket Board
- Operator: Pakistan Cricket Board; Bahria Town Group
- Capacity: 50,000
- Surface: Grass (Oval)

Construction
- Opened: 2025; 1 year ago
- Architect: Gerkan, Marg and Partners

Tenant
- Pakistan national cricket team (planned) Karachi Kings (planned)

Rafi Cricket Stadium is an under-construction cricket stadium located in Bahria Town Karachi, Pakistan. Designed by Gerkan, Marg and Partners, the stadium has an PSL, ICC-certified design. The complex consists of a cricket academy of international standard, gymnasium, swimming pool, and hostels. The complex also includes a sports academy.

== Groundbreaking ceremony ==
The groundbreaking ceremony was held in Karachi on Friday, 14 April 2017. The ceremony was attended, among others, by Pakistani cricketers Javed Miandad, Zaheer Abbas, Shoaib Mohammad, Shahid Afridi, Umar Akmal, and Fawad Alam.

The chief guest of the event was the Chairman of Bahria Town, Malik Riaz Hussain, who performed the groundbreaking ceremony by pressing the button to start the crane on the project site. He said at the event that Rafi Cricket Stadium would be built in about one and a half years, and by next two years, there will be international cricket matches in this ground. Given the level of security in Bahria Town, and ongoing construction of Hyatt Regency Hotel near Theme Park in Precinct 5, Rafi Cricket Stadium will be an optimal place for hosting international cricket events. It is going to be the largest cricket stadium of Pakistan in terms of sitting capacity.

== Architect ==
Designed by GMP Germany, the creators of Dubai International Cricket Stadium, Rafi Cricket Stadium's structure has been designed by Boston-based Simpson SGH whereas the façade has been created by SBP Consultants Germany and M&B (Mushtaq & Bilal) Pakistan, MEP is designed by SMC (S. Mehboob & Company) Pakistan, and Pre-Cast Support Consultants are JPC, USA.
