= Bahria Town Karachi =

Bahria Town Karachi بحریہ ٹاؤن کراچی
- Gated community
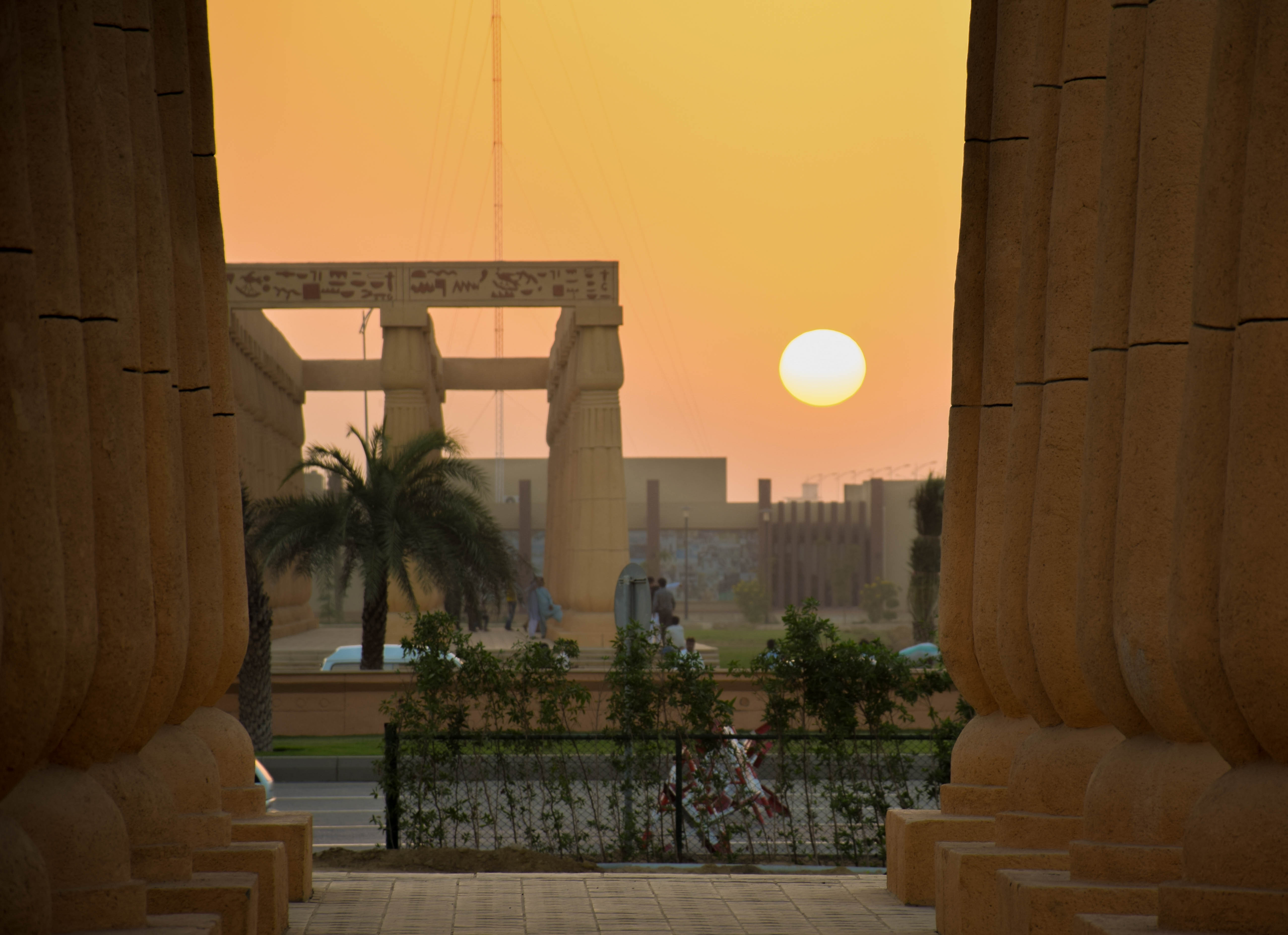
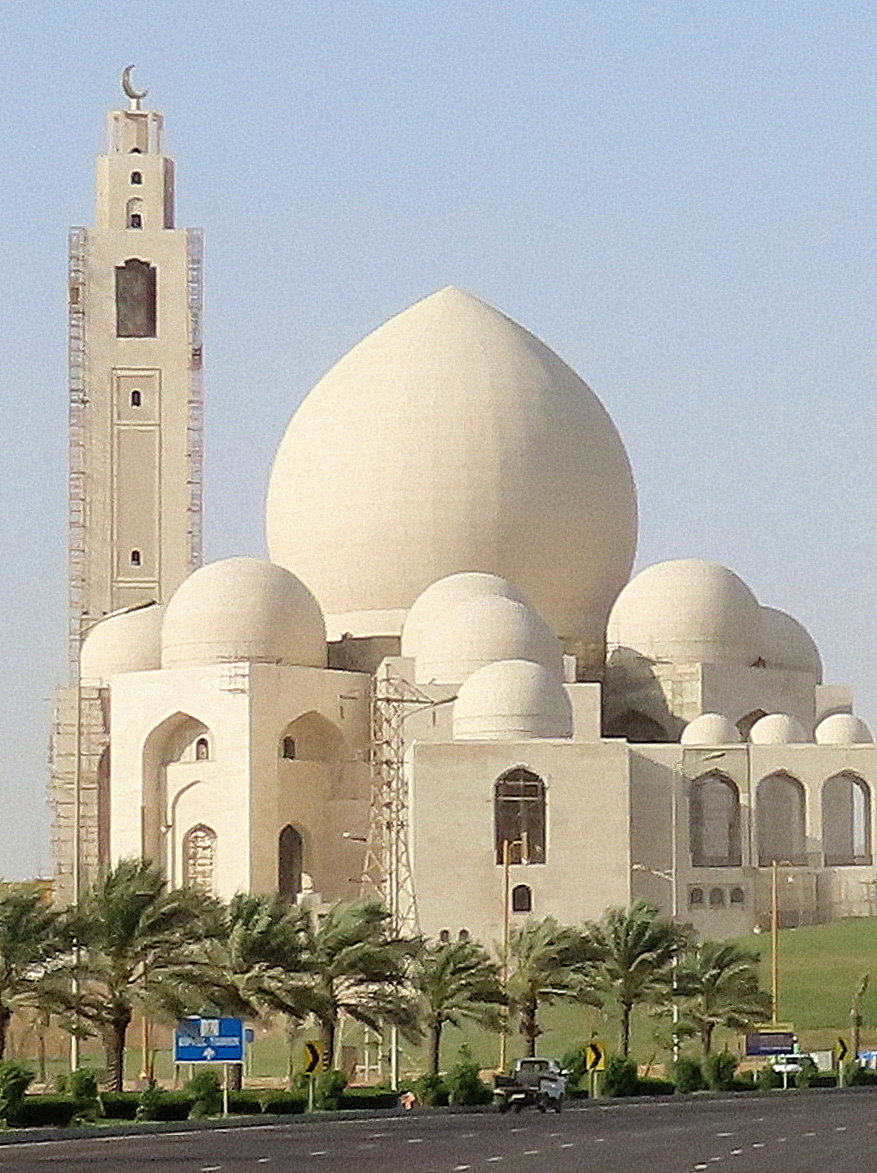
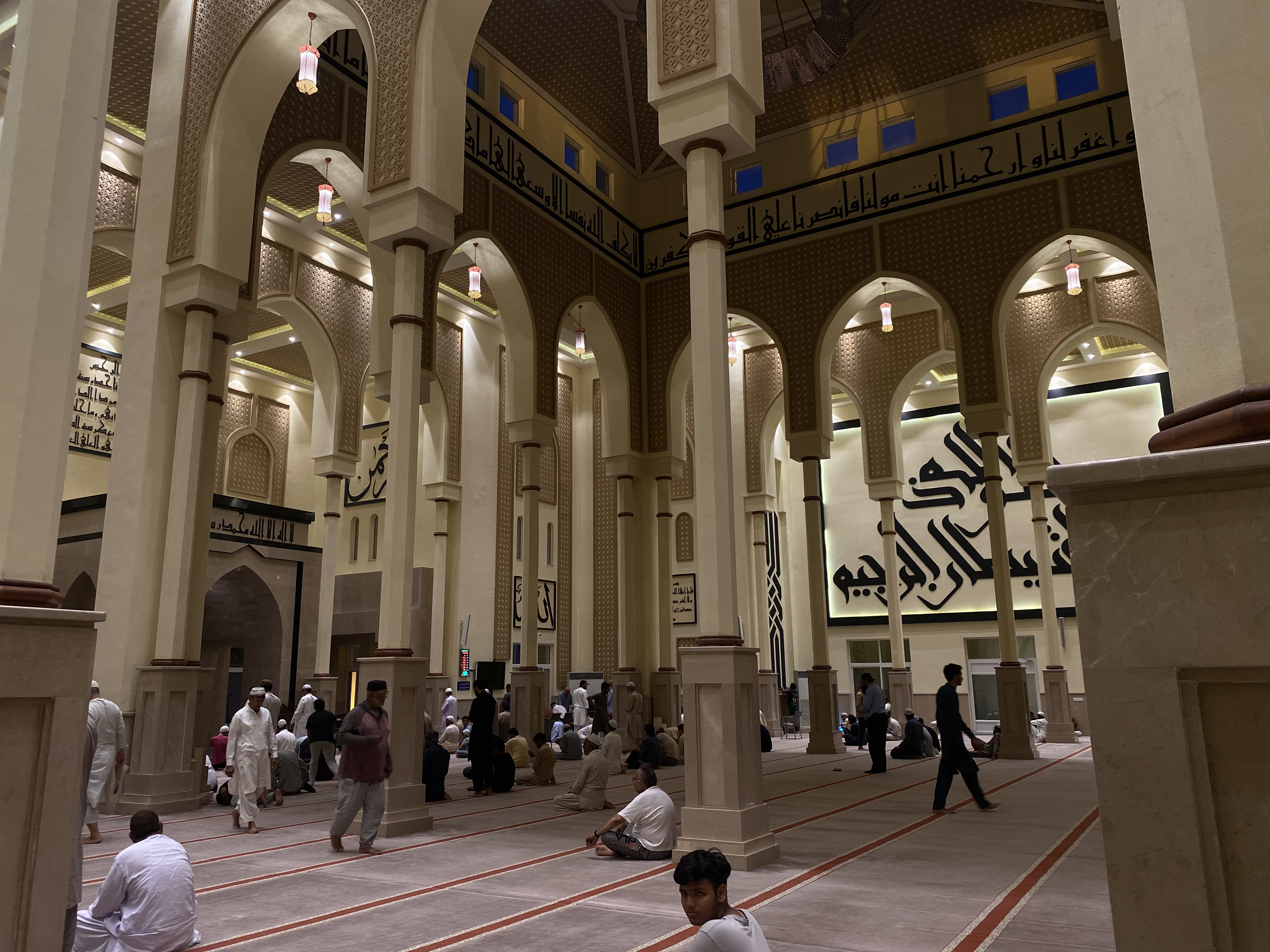
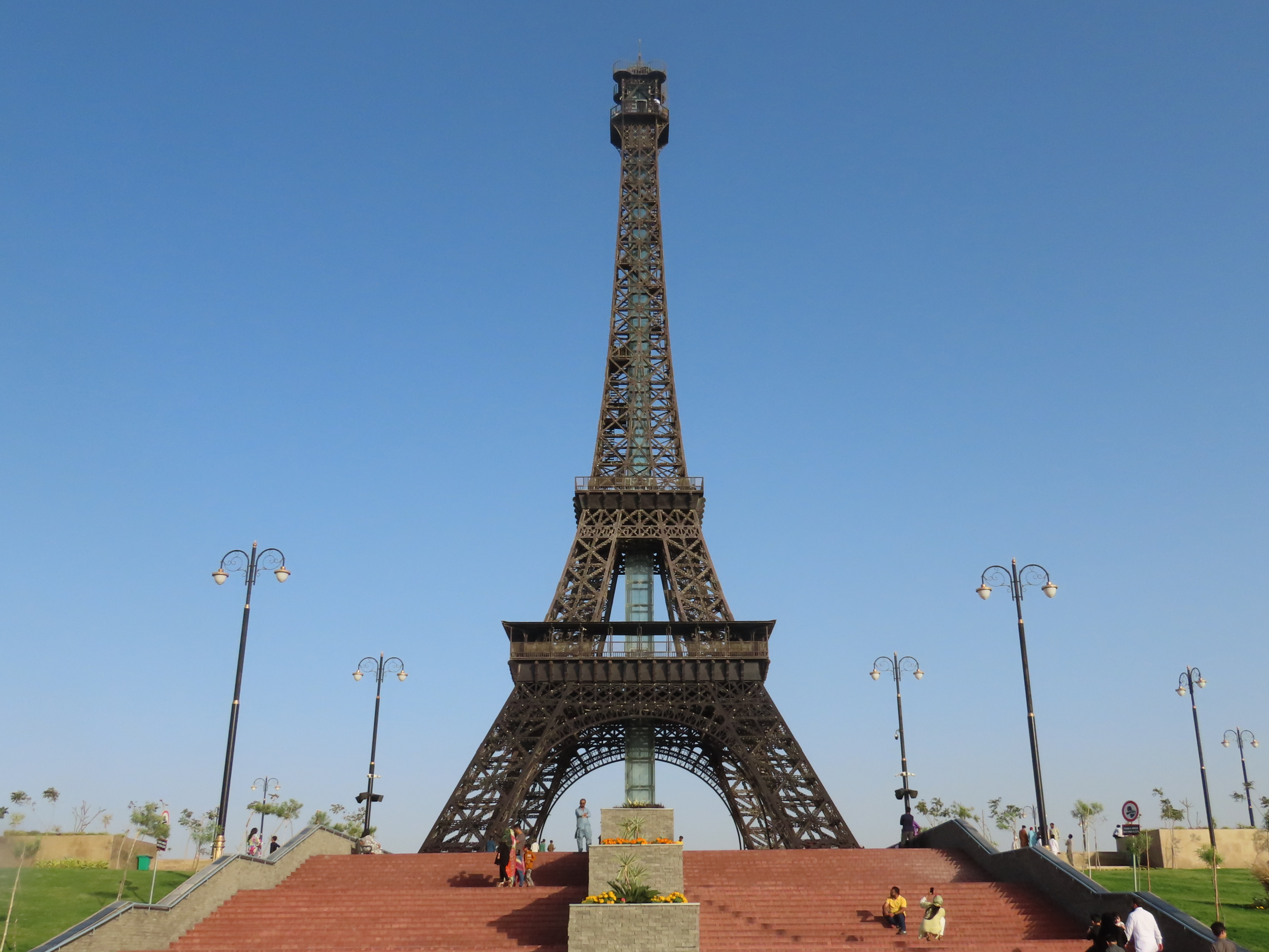
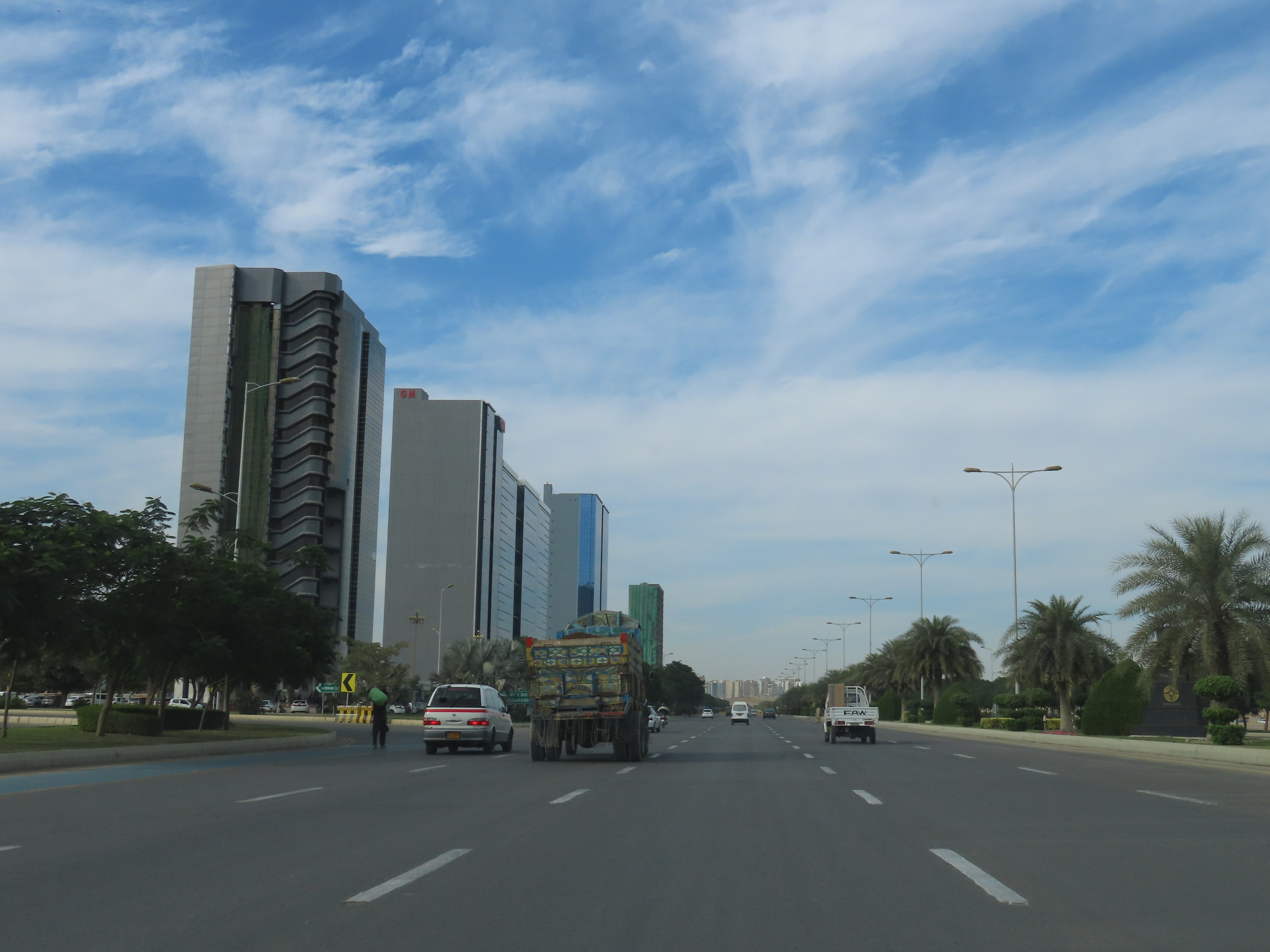
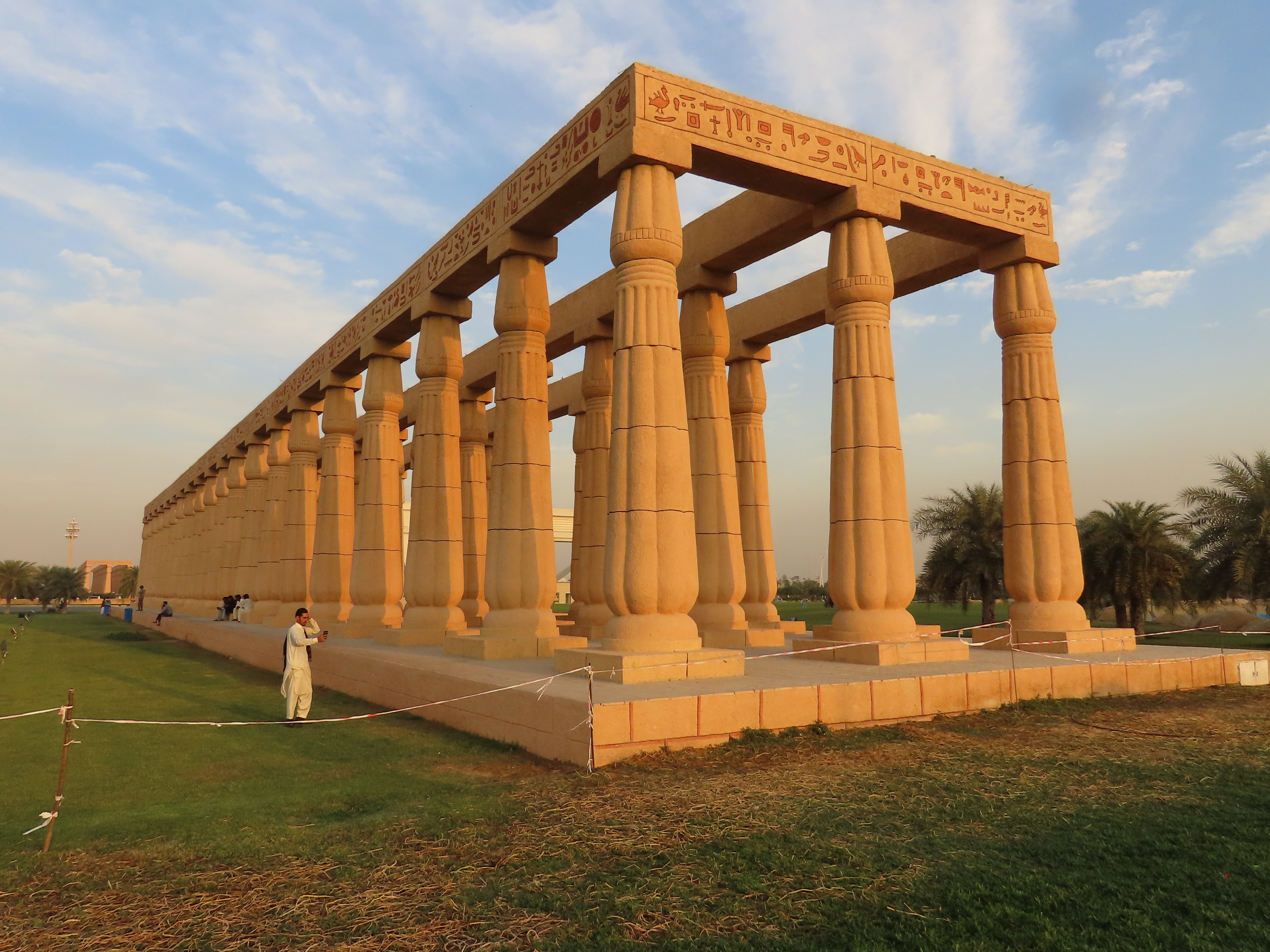
- Interactive map of Bahria Town Karachi
- Coordinates: +) 25°00′N 67°19′E
- Country: Pakistan
- State: Sindh
- District: Malir
- Established: 2014

Government
  - Type: Privately owned and managed

Area
  - Total: 186 km^{2} (72 sq mi)

Population (2022)
  - Total: 100,000 +
  - Density: 540/km^{2} (1,400/sq mi)
- Time zone: PST
- Size: 46,000 acres
- Website: www.bahriatown.com

Bahria Town Karachi is a privately owned gated community located in northeast of Karachi, Pakistan. The suburb is being developed by Malik Riaz and his Bahria Town Group, and is located just off the M-9 Motorway and occupies over 186 km^{2} (72 sq mi). Construction began in 2014.

The community includes the Grand Jamia Mosque, which is planned to be the world's third largest mosque, and the Rafi Cricket Stadium, the country's largest, designed by GMW Architects. Bahria Town has the Danzoo which is the largest zoo in Karachi. It has Bahria Adventura which is the largest theme park in Karachi. It has multiple schools, colleges, universities, hospitals, parks, monuments, cinemas and shopping malls. The community is divided by the 25-kilometre-long (16 mi), 120-metre-wide (400 ft), 18-lane, Jinnah Avenue. The community will be energy independent with a coal-fired and an LNG-powered electricity generation plant, in partnership with K-Electric. It is also home to a 36-hole United States Golf Association standard golf course.

The community consists of over 60 precincts and is planned to house around one million people. The town will be connected to I. I. Chundrigar Road by a Karachi Metrobus route in the future. In 2019, Bahria Town Karachi demanded unplanned 35% development charges, which were later inferred for an unknown period.

The Malir Expressway is a new inter-city highway being built from district south Karachi, all the way up to the M-9 motorway. This new 39 km highway will facilitate traffic from with in the city of Karachi, to the motorway and Bahria Town Karachi. This inter-city high will have multiple interchanges within the city, and will make quick access to Bahria Town a possibility. With the current given estimated, this will cut down driving time to Bahria town by almost 40 minutes. What use to take 1 hour 10 minutes, will only take 30 minutes. Phase 1 of this project was opened by January 20, 2025, and phase 2 to be in operation by 2026.

== Sub-divisions ==
Bahria Town Karachi is divided into more than 60 precincts.

Sub-division	Description
Precincts 1 through 31	Residential plots of 104, 209 and 418 square metres.
Bahria Farmhouses	3344 to 6689 square metre Plots
Bahria Sports City	Residential plots around the Rafi Cricket Stadium
Bahria Homes	104 and 167 square metre townhouses.
Bahria Paradise Villas	418 m^{2} (4,500 sq ft)
Bahria Apartments	2, 3 and 4 bedroom low-rise apartments
Bahria Heights	Mixed-use development with furnished 2-bedroom apartments and shops.
Jinnah Avenue	Modeled after the Sheikh Zayed road in Dubai, the 120-metre road with 46 m^{2} (500 sq ft) commercial plots for high rise buildings.
Bahria future projects agency	the 120-metre road with 46 m^{2} (500 sq ft) commercial plots for high rise buildings.
Bahria Karachi Golf Club	36 Hole PGA Standard Golf Course
Grand Jamia Mosque	Planned to be the third largest in the world.

== Infrastructure ==
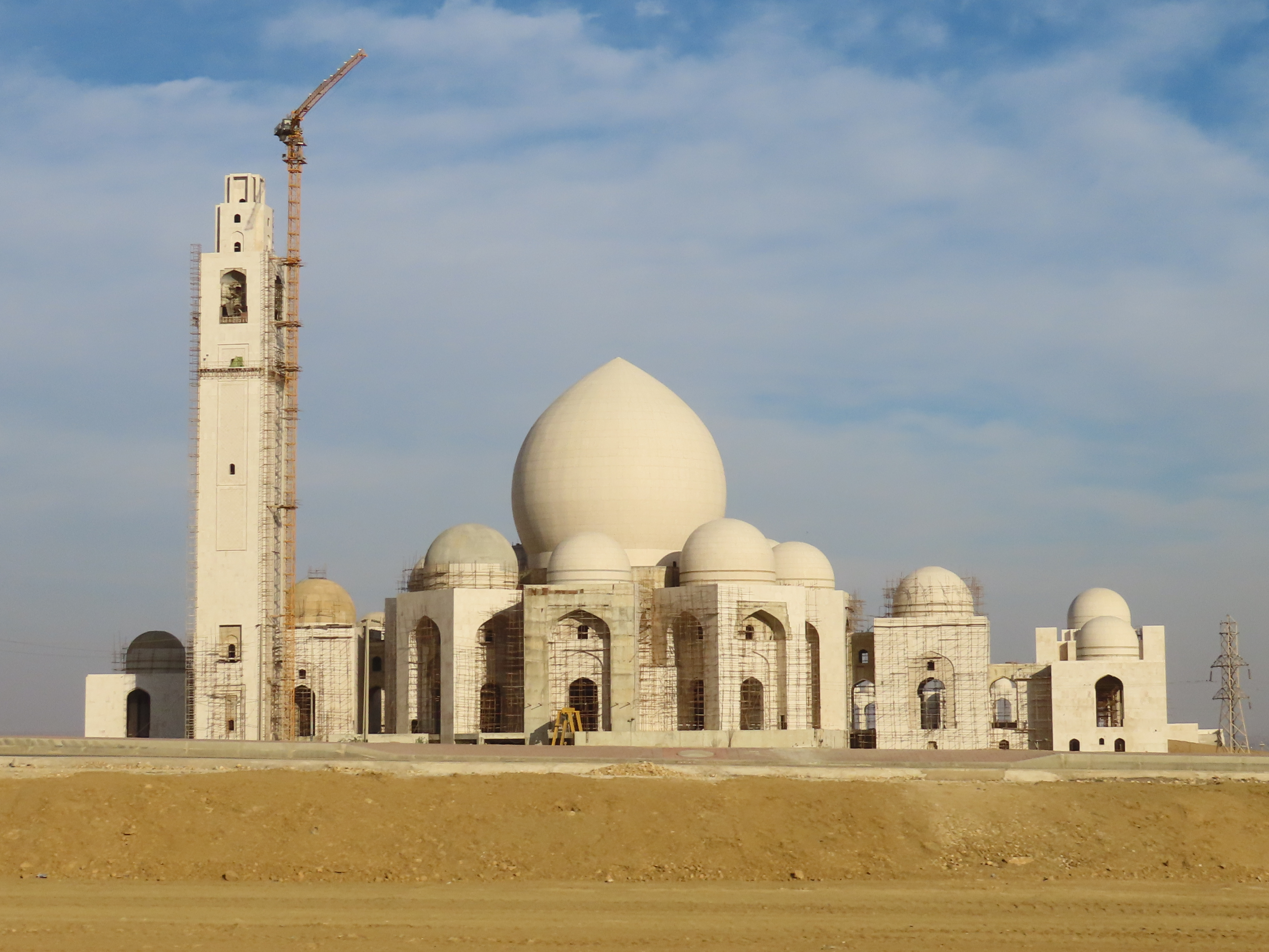
The community includes the Grand Jamia Mosque, which is planned to be the world's third largest mosque.

Power & Utilities

- Grid Independence: The community is designed to be energy independent through its own power generation plants, including LNG-powered facilities in partnership with K-Electric.
- Backup Power: Residents are provided with 100% backup power to ensure no load-shedding.
- Underground Services: All utility cabling, including electricity, gas, and telecommunications, is installed underground to maintain safety and aesthetic standards.

Water & Waste Management

- Sewerage Treatment Plants (STP): Bahria Town uses dedicated STPs to harvest and recycle domestic water for horticulture and cleaning.
- Water Conservation: The infrastructure includes mini-dams to conserve rainwater and prevent flooding during monsoon seasons.
- Smart Drainage: A modern drainage system is integrated into the road network and underpasses to manage heavy rainfall.

== Controversies ==
2015–2016: Land Allotment Disputes

In 2015, questions were raised regarding the exact acreage of land allotted to Bahria Town Karachi by the Malir Development Authority (MDA). By August 2016, the Supreme Court of Pakistan issued an interim order to halt construction on approximately 2,342 hectares (5,786 acres), citing irregularities in the land exchange process between the Sindh Government and the MDA. Bahria Town officials maintained that the land was lawfully acquired from local owners and through official government channels.

The Rs460 Billion Supreme Court Settlement

Following a 2018 ruling that declared certain land acquisitions illegal, the Supreme Court of Pakistan accepted a Rs460 billion (approx. $3.1 billion) settlement from Bahria Town in March 2019. This massive financial commitment, unprecedented for a private entity in Pakistan, was intended to legalize 6,837.5 hectares and protect the project from total closure. The payment schedule required significant liquidity, including a Rs25 billion down payment and subsequent monthly installments of Rs2.25 billion.

The "Affectee" Dilemma and New Launches

During the years of legal uncertainty (2017–2020), a segment of investors—often referred to as "affectees"—found their plots located on un-validated or disputed land. While these members awaited resolution, Bahria Town launched new sub-projects, such as Bahria Paradise and Bahria Greens.

- Criticism: Some allottees and observers criticized the management for launching these new schemes and collecting new booking fees before fully resolving the status of those stuck in original precincts.
- Developer Strategy: Management argued these launches were necessary to maintain cash flow—essential for both ongoing construction and meeting the massive Supreme Court payment obligations—thereby ensuring the overall project remained viable for everyone.

Resolution through Merging and Adjustments

Recognizing the frustration of affectees, Bahria Town eventually implemented a multi-layered accommodation strategy to ensure that public investment was not lost:

- Merging of Funds: Allottees in disputed areas were given the option to "merge" their paid-up installments into other active projects. This included transferring funds toward the purchase of villas, apartments, or commercial spaces in private high-rise projects developed by third parties within the township.
- Alternative Allotments: Many members were offered relocation to validated precincts, though this sometimes involved price adjustments based on the market value of the new location.
- Internal Transfers: Bahria Town adjusted many affectees to the alternate precincts or accommodated them in different projects within BTK.

Current Perspective

While the 2019 settlement remains a significant financial weight on the organization, the majority of the original "affectees" have had their claims addressed through these merging and adjustment schemes. The project has evolved into a fully functional city-within-a-city providing international standard living to Karachiites.

== Gallery ==
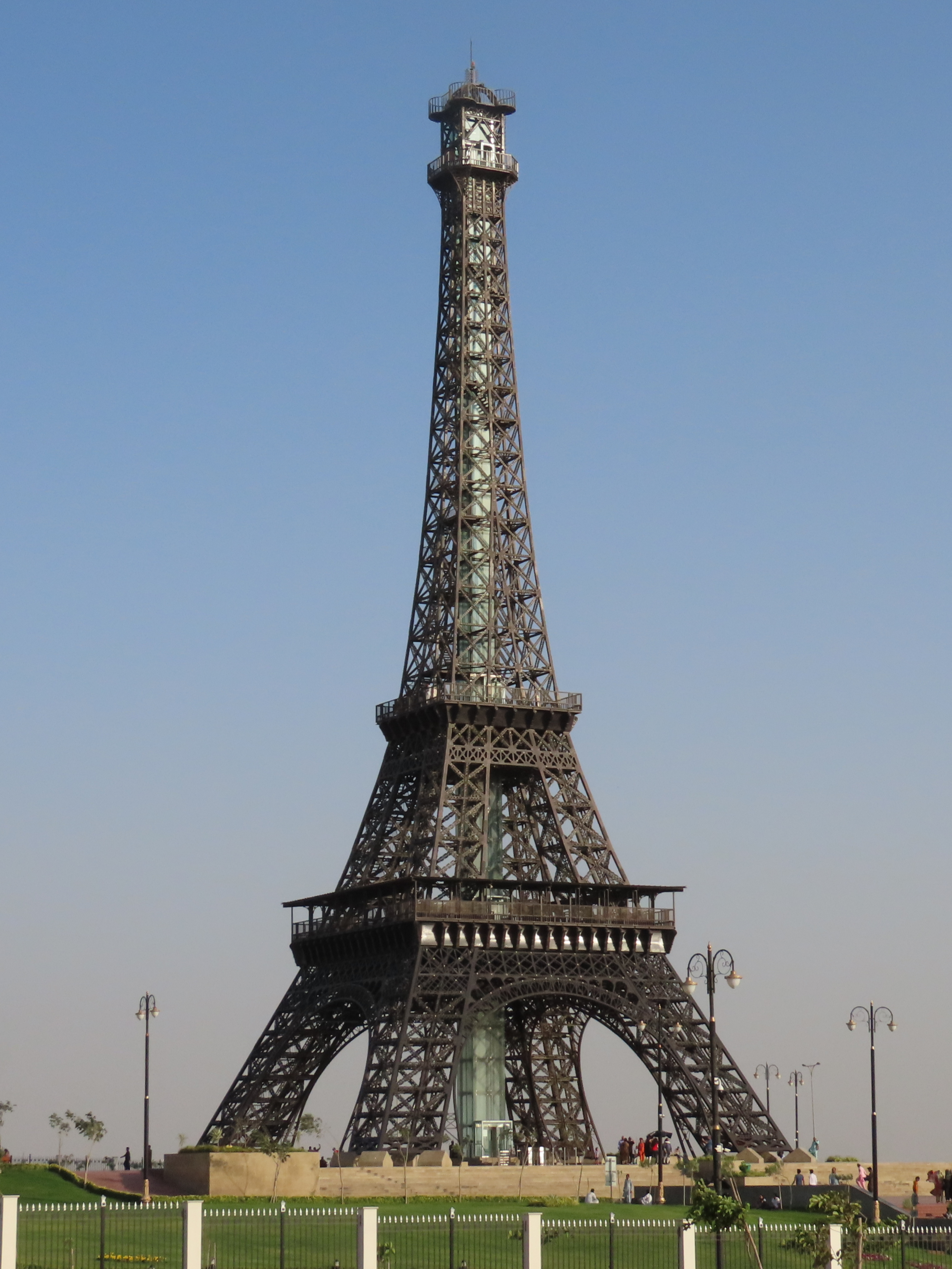
Bahria Town Eiffel Tower is built on a hill and is visible from far away

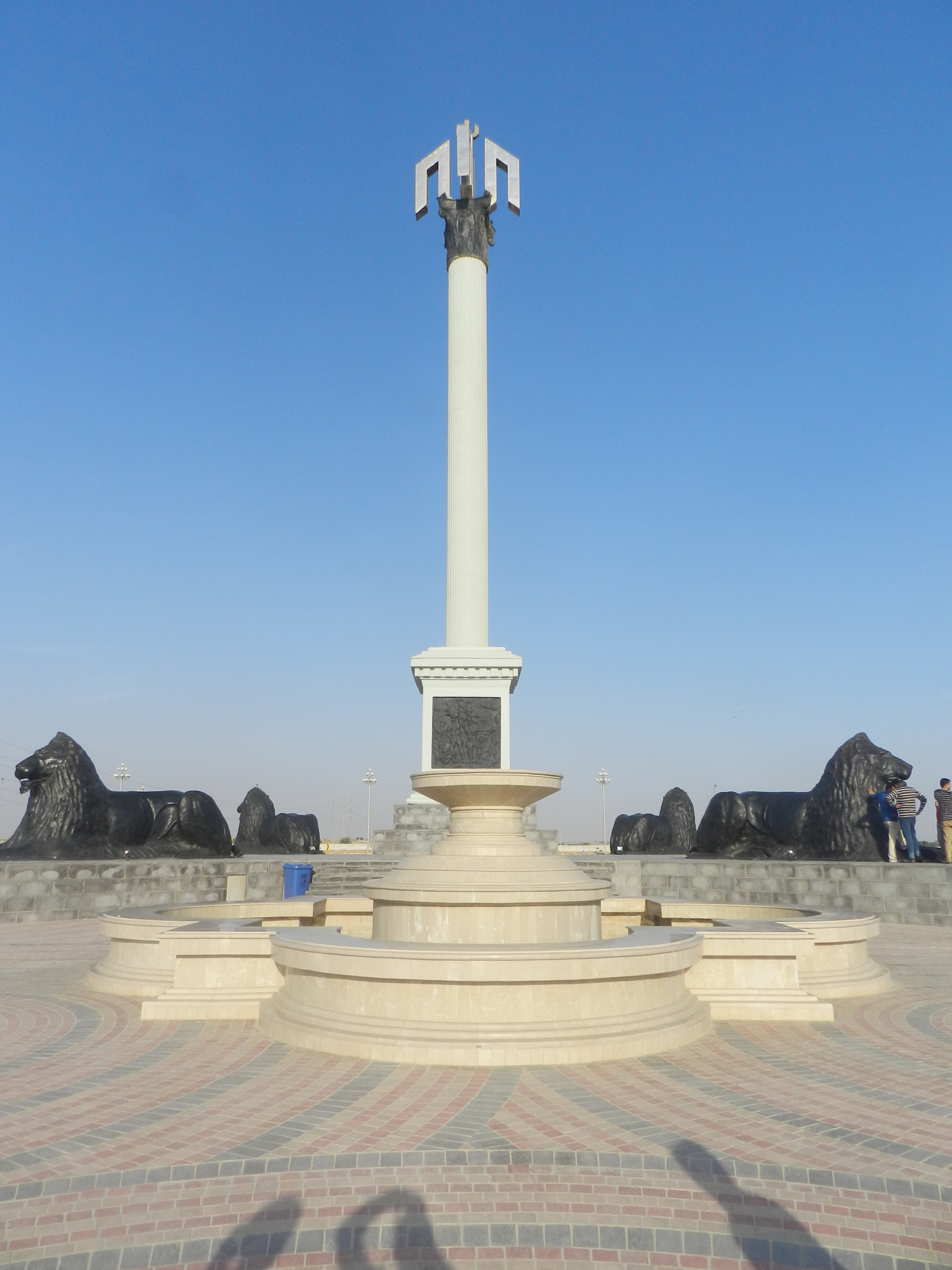
Tauheed Square, one of the largest in Bahria Town

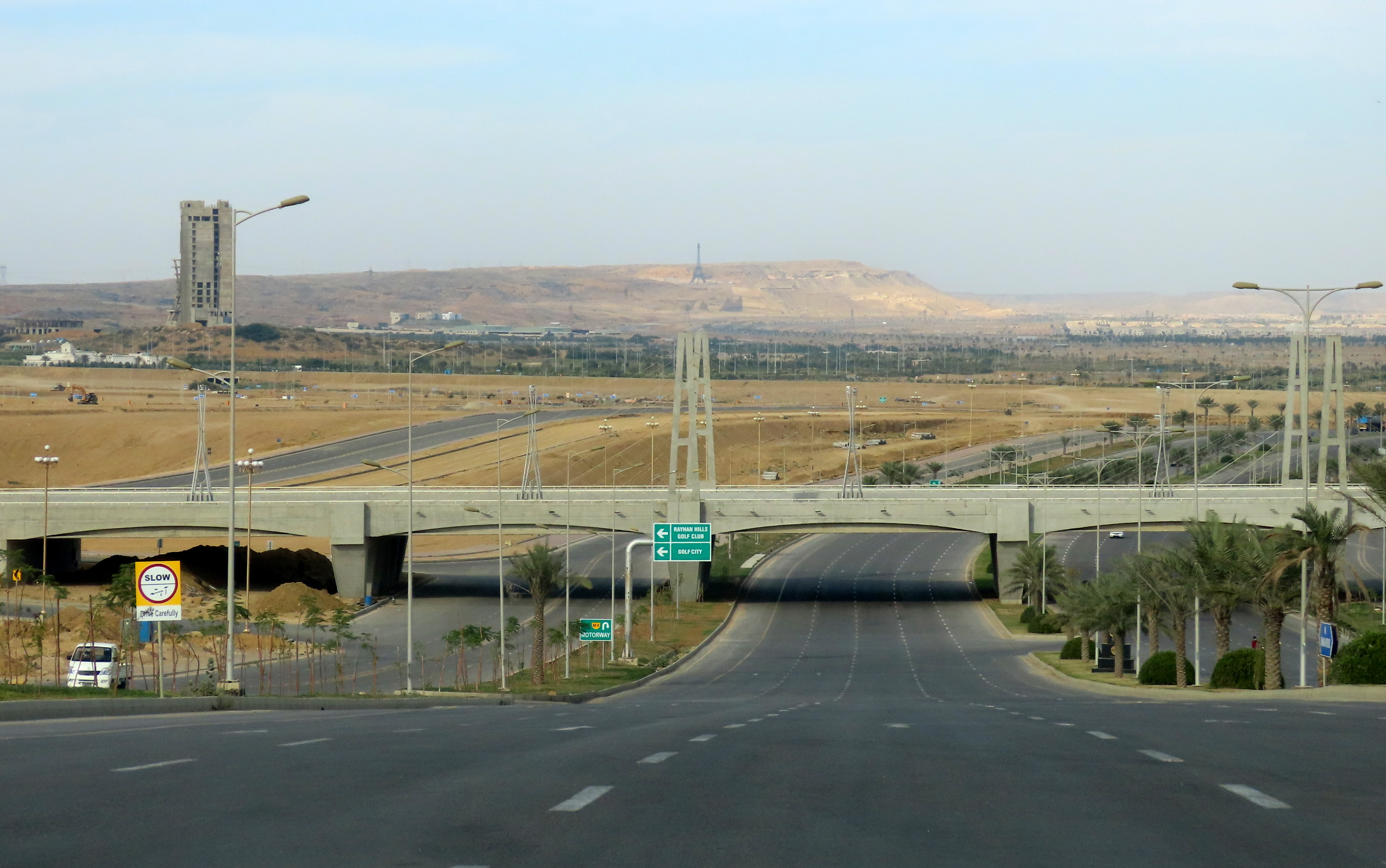
17th Avenue Bridge

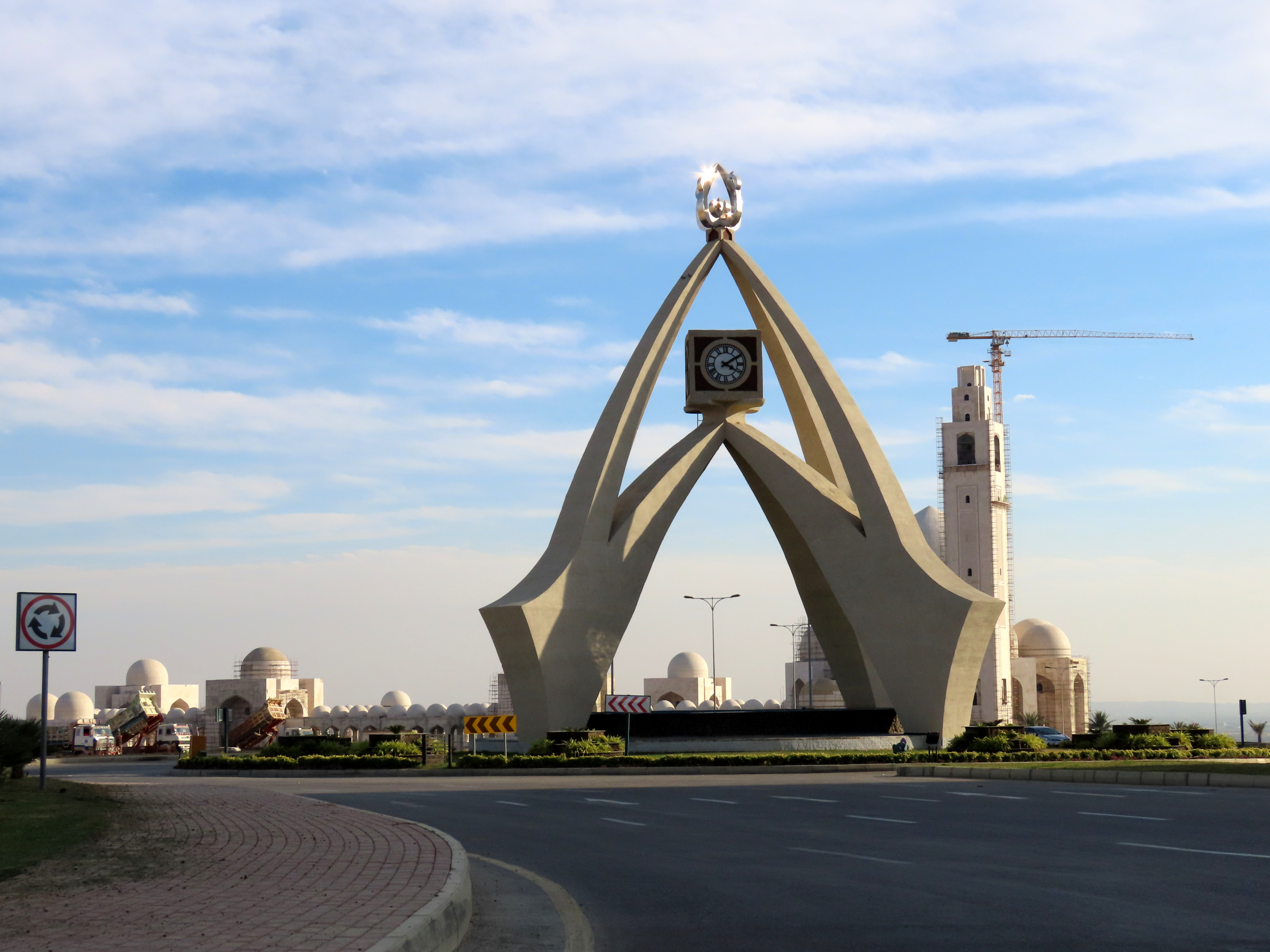
Allah Wali Roundabout

== See also ==
- DHA City
