= Grand Jamia Mosque, Karachi =

Mosque in Karachi, Pakistan

Grand Jamia Mosque
- گرینڈ جامع مسجد،
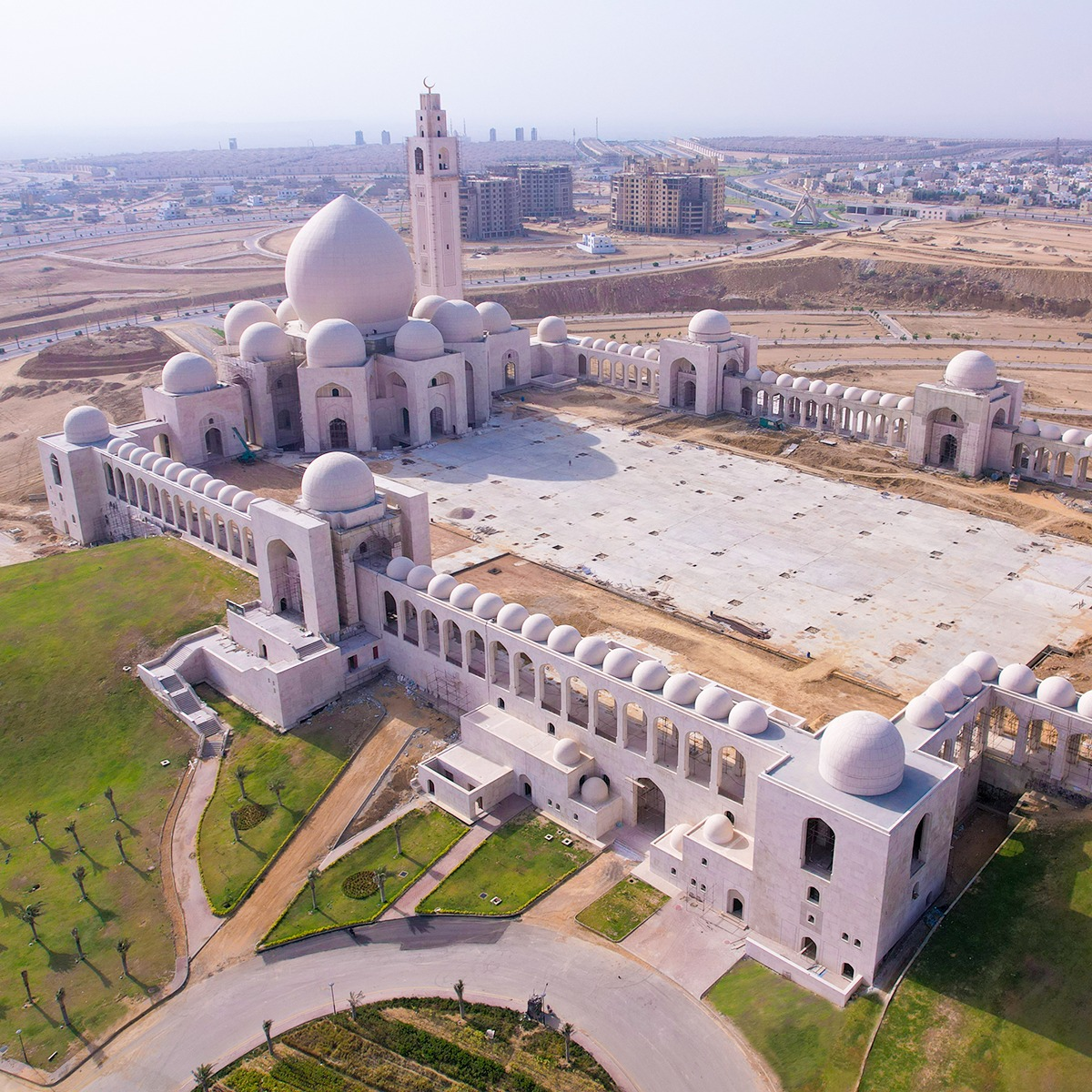
- Under construction in 2020

Religion
- Affiliation: Sunni Islam
- Status: Completed

Location
- Location: Bahria Town Karachi, Sindh
- Country: Pakistan
- Interactive map of Grand Jamia Mosque
- Coordinates: 25°02′52″N 67°19′24″E

Architecture
- Architect: Nayyar Ali Dada
- Style: Islamic Architecture: Mughal; Persian; Chinese; Turkish
- Groundbreaking: 6 January 2015
- Completed: 1 February 2026

Specifications
- Capacity: 600,000 worshipers
- Dome: 150
- Dome height (outer): 75 metres (246 ft) (largest)
- Minaret: 1
- Minaret height: 99 m (325 ft)
- Materials: Marble

The Grand Jamia Mosque (Urdu: گرینڈ جامع مسجد, romanized: graiṇḍ jāmi' masjid) is a mosque located in Bahria Town Karachi, in the Sindh province of Pakistan, completed on February 1, 2026. The complex includes a mosque with the capacity to accommodate 600,000 worshippers at a time, making it Pakistan's largest and the world's fourth-largest mosque according to capacity.

== Design ==
The design is a blend of Mughal and Persian architecture. An area of 20 hectares (50 acres) at the top of a 18-metre (60 ft) hill was selected so that the mosque would be visible from some distance away. The design includes a 99-metre (325 ft) single-monument minaret. The Mosque contains 150 domes in total. The height of the largest single dome is 75 metres (246 ft). High quality beige-coloured marble from Balochistan is used in the construction. The complex will be surrounded by large gardens surrounded by arch-shaped walls on all four sides.

The mosque will have fountains within the courtyard. To protect worshippers from the sun, the courtyard will have automated umbrellas similar in design to the ones in Al-Masjid an-Nabawi.

== Gallery ==
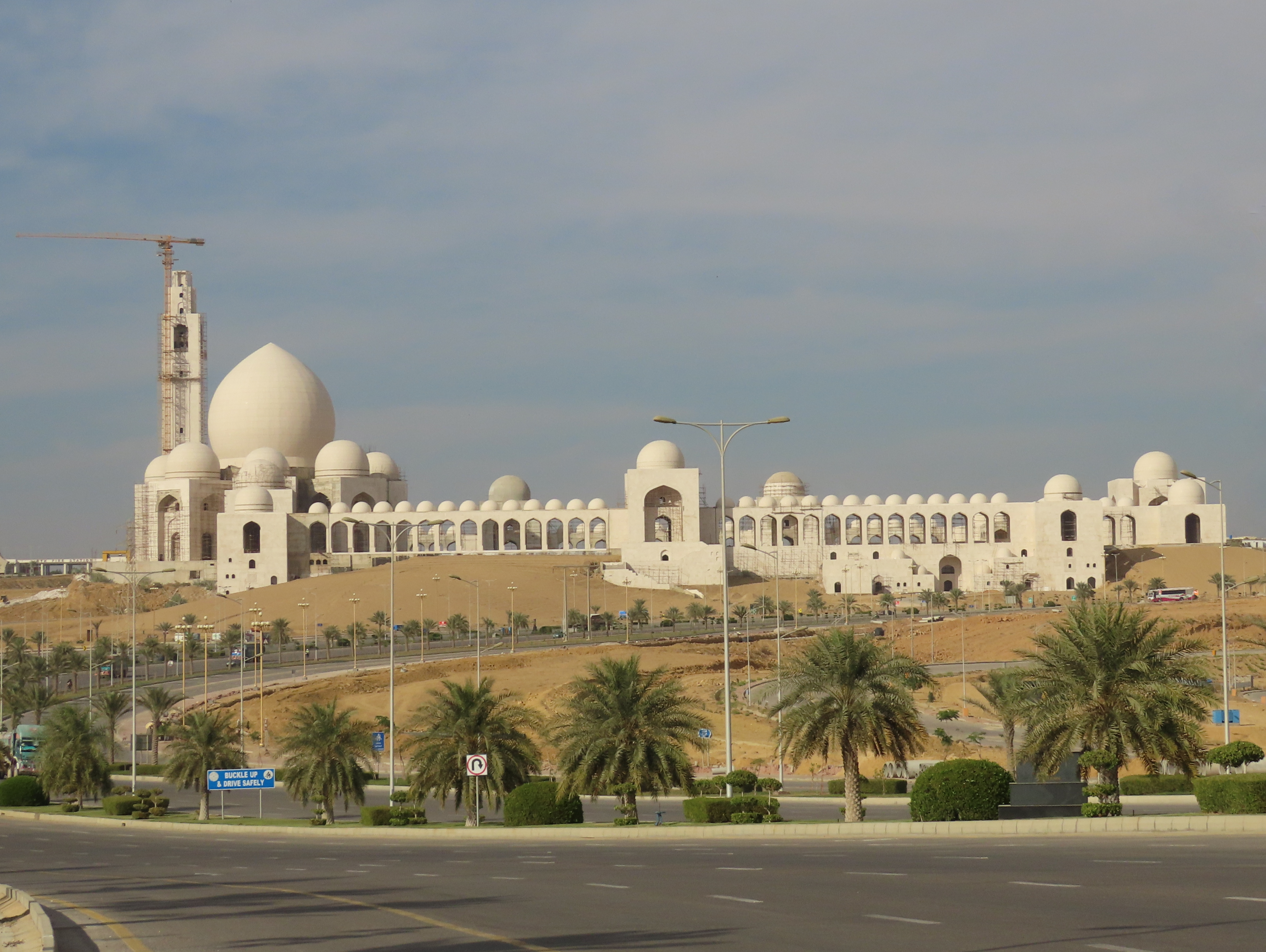
Under construction in 2020

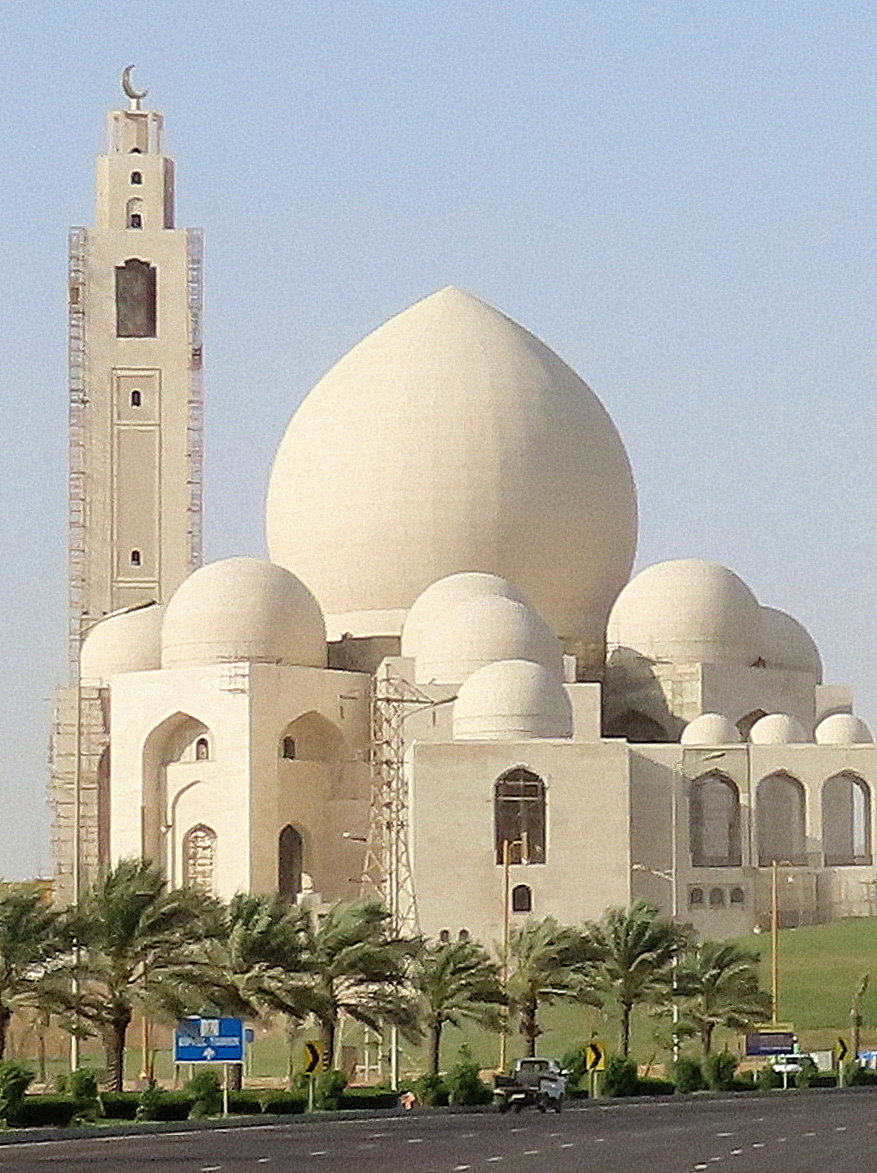
The mosque in 2022

== See also ==
- List of largest mosques
- Islamic architecture
- Architecture of Pakistan
- List of mosques in Pakistan
