= Lahore =

Capital of Punjab, Pakistan

Lahore: لاہور (Urdu); لہور (Punjabi)
- Megacity
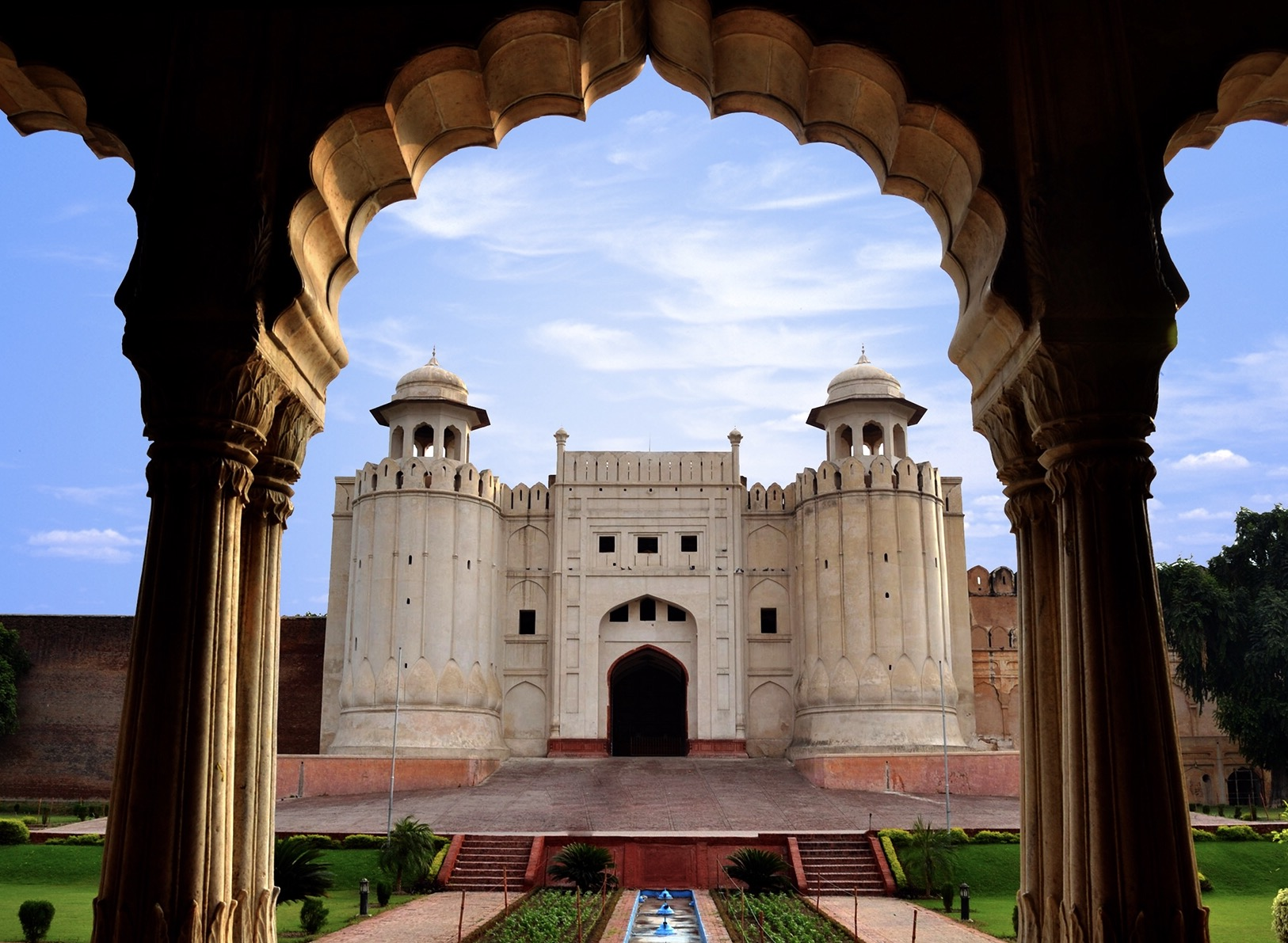
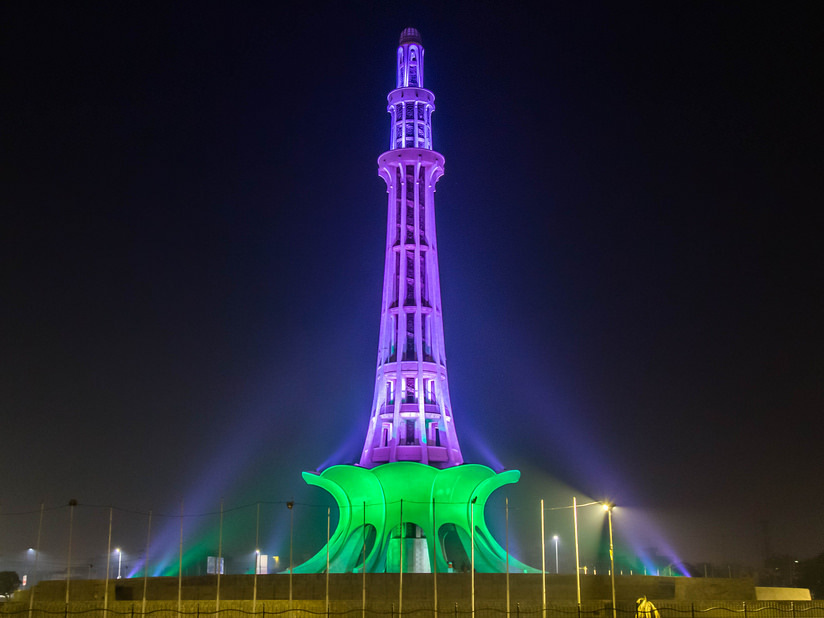
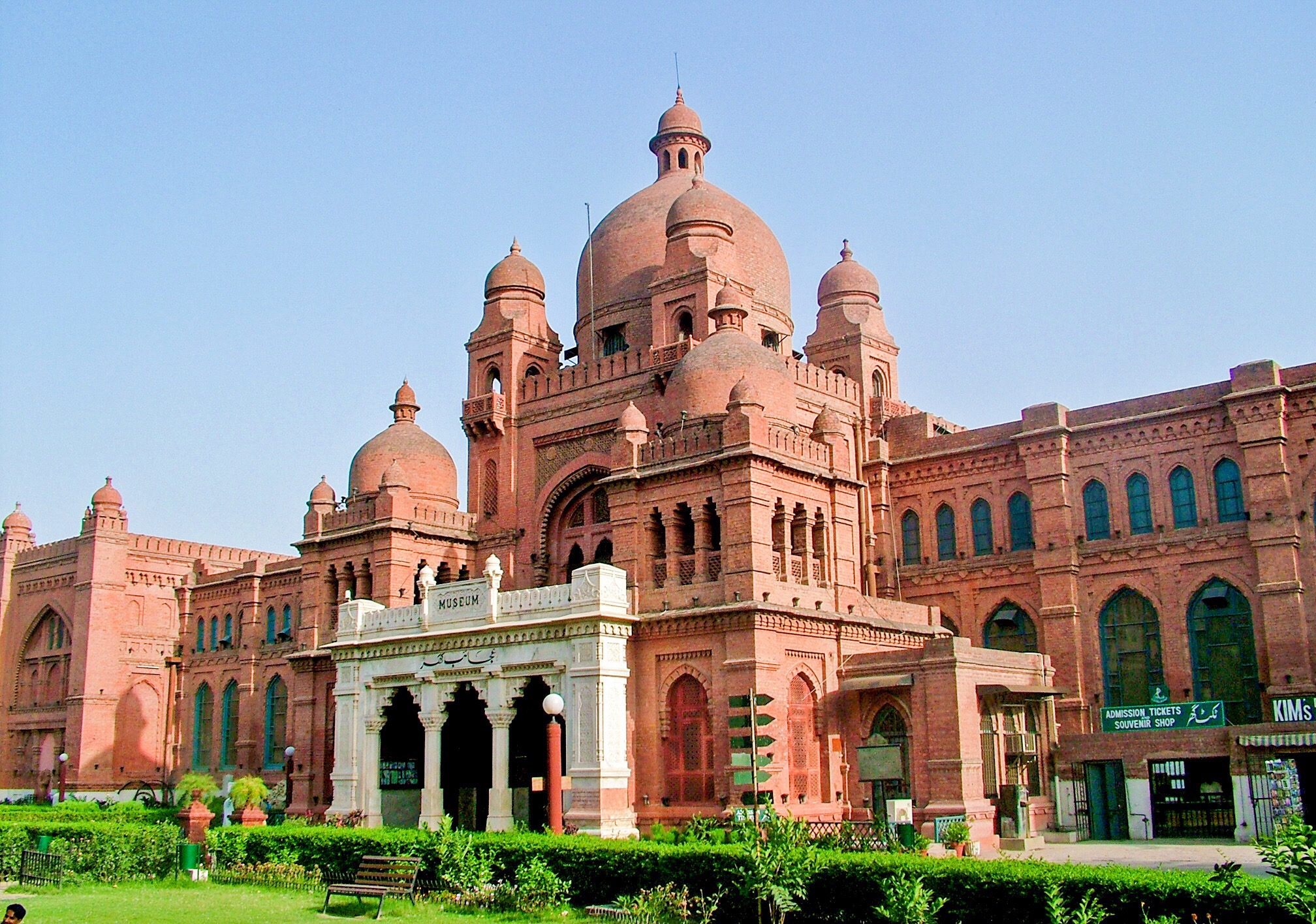
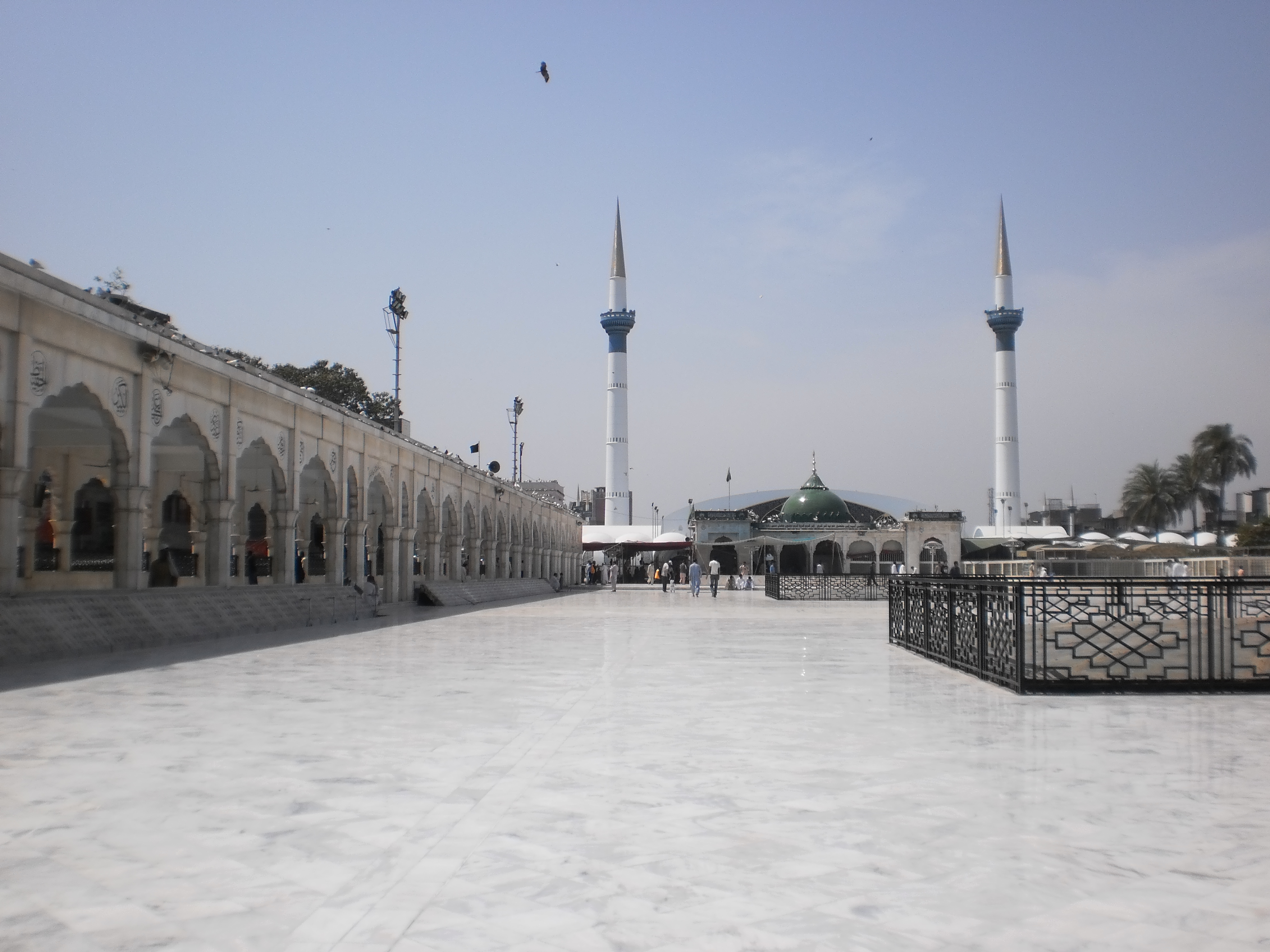
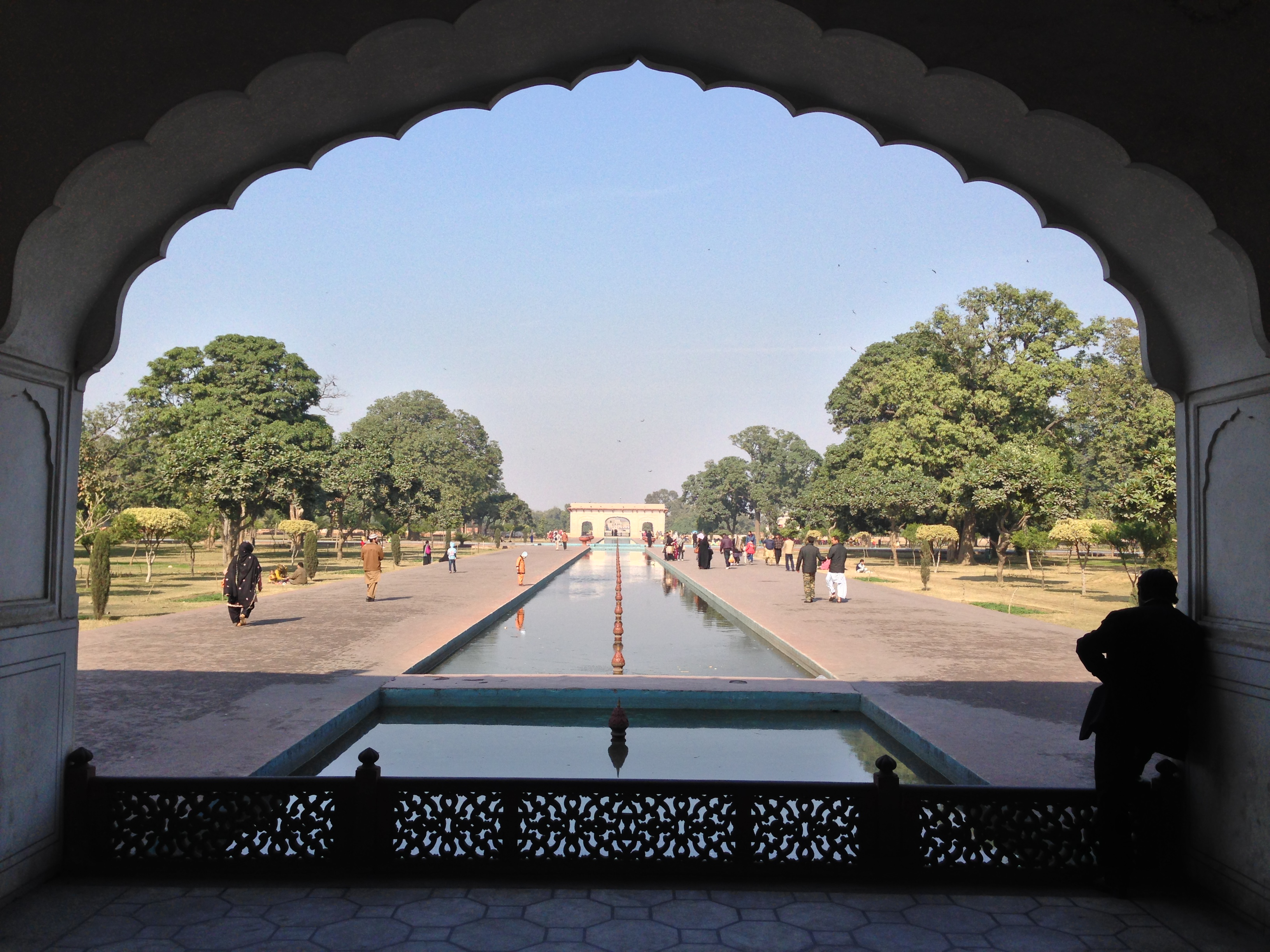
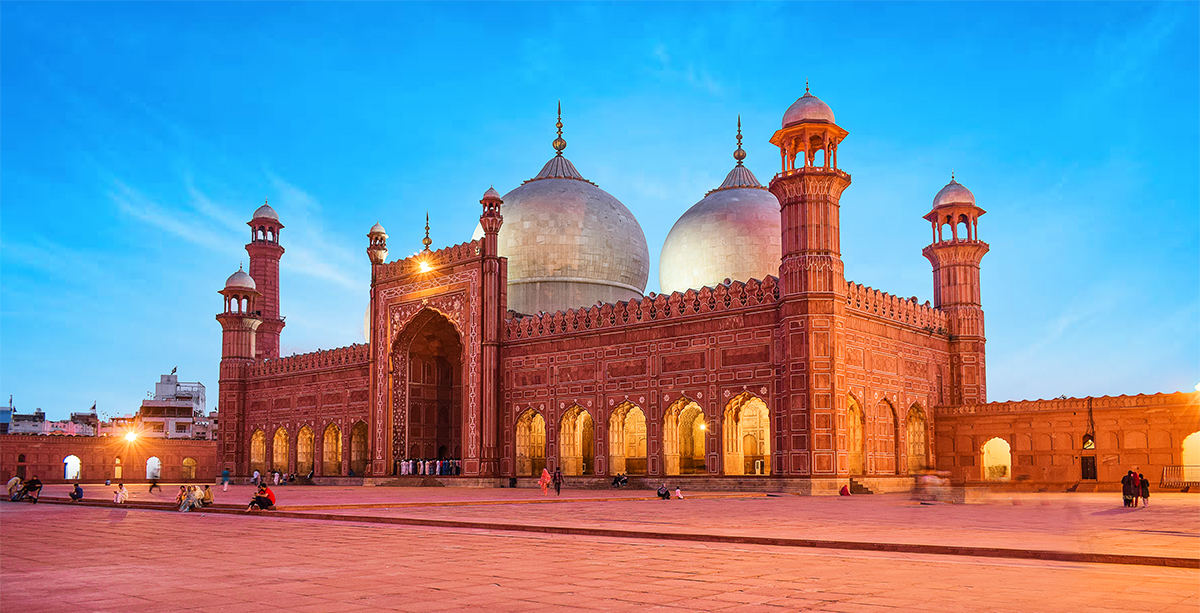
- Lahore Fort Minar-e-Pakistan Lahore Museum Data Darbar Shalamar Gardens Badshahi Mosque

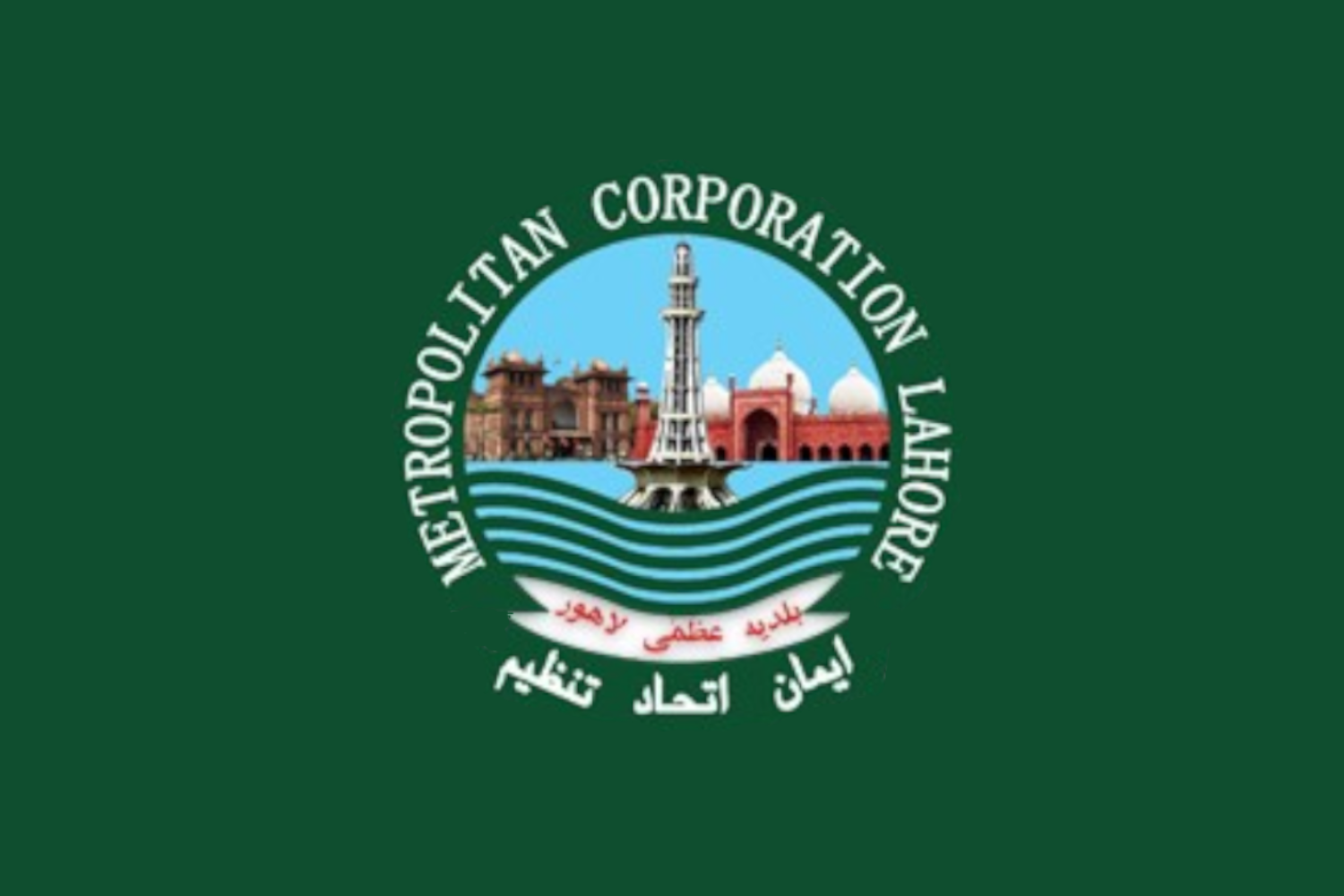
- Flag Seal
- Nicknames: The Heart of Pakistan, Paris of the East, City of Gardens, City of Literature (by UNESCO)
- Location in Pakistan
- Coordinates: 31°32′59″N 74°20′37″E
- Country: Pakistan
- Province: Punjab
- Division: Lahore
- District: Lahore
- Founded: Between 1st and 7th centuries CE
- City status: 1040; 986 years ago
- Capital status (Note: Lahore served as the capital of three major Empires: Delhi Sultanate (1206–1210), Mughal Empire (1586–1598) and Sikh Empire (1801–1849)): 25 June 1206; 820 years ago 27 May 1586; 440 years ago 12 April 1801; 225 years ago
- Metropolitan status: 3 February 1890; 136 years ago
- Metropolitan seat: Lahore Town Hall
- Zones: 10: Ravi; Shalimar; Aziz Bhatti; Data Gunj Buksh; Gulberg; Samanabad; Iqbal; Nishtar; Wagah; Cantonment

Government
  - Type: Metropolitan corporation
  - Body: Lahore Metropolitan Corporation
  - Mayor: None
  - Deputy Mayors: 9 Zonal Mayors
  - Deputy Commissioner: Syed Musa Raza (BPS-19 PAS)
  - Capital City Police Officer: Bilal Siddiqui Kamyana (BPS-21 PSP)
  - Punjab Assembly: 30 members: Sami Ullah Khan (PML-N; PP-145); Ghazali Saleem Butt (PML-N; PP-146); Muhammad Riaz Malik (PML-N; PP-147); Mujtaba Shuja-ur-Rehman (PML-N; PP-148); Muhammad Shoaib Siddiqui (IPP; PP-149); Khawaja Imran Nazir (PML-N; PP-150); Sohail Shaukat Butt (PML-N; PP-151); Malik Muhammad Waheed (PML-N; PP-152); Khawaja Salman Rafique (PML-N; PP-153); Ghulam Habib Awan (PML-N; PP-154); Imtiaz Mehmood (SIC; PP-155); Ali Imtiaz Warraich (SIC; PP-156); Hafiz Farhat Abbas (SIC; PP-157); Muhammad Nawaz Ladhar (PML-N; PP-158); Maryam Nawaz Sharif (PML-N; PP-159); Asad Ali Khokhar (PML-N; PP-160); Farrukh Javaid (SIC; PP-161); Shahbaz Ali Khokhar (PML-N; PP-162); Imran Javed (PML-N; PP-163); Rana Rashid Minhas (PML-N; PP-164); Ahmer Rasheed Bhatti (SIC; PP-165); Muhammad Anas Mehmood (PML-N; PP-166); Irfan Shafi Khokhar (PML-N; PP-167); Faisal Ayub Khokhar (PML-N; PP-168); Khalid Pervaz Khokhar (PML-N; PP-169); Muhammad Haroon Akbar (SIC; PP-170); Muhammad Aslam Iqbal (SIC; PP-171); Misbah Wajid (SIC; PP-172); Mian Marghoob Ahmad (PML-N; PP-173); Bilal Yasin (PML-N; PP-174)

Area
  - Metro: 1,772 km^{2} (684 sq mi)
  - Rank: 1st in Punjab; 2nd in Pakistan
- Highest elevation (Note: The highest point in Lahore is the Walled City): 231 m (758 ft)
- Lowest elevation: 196 m (643 ft)

Population (2023)
  - Megacity: 13,004,135
  - Rank: 1st in Punjab; 2nd in Pakistan; 26th in world
  - Metro density: 7,339/km^{2} (19,010/sq mi)
  - Language(s): Urdu and English (official); Punjabi (native)
- Demonym(s): General: Lahori (Note: In Punjabi, the demonyms are used as: Lahorī (لہوری) – general (both singular and plural) and gender-neutral; Lahorīyā (لہوریہ) – singular and masculine; Lahorīye (لہوریے) – plural and masculine; Lahoran (لہورن) – general (both singular and plural) and feminine); English: Lahorite

Religion (2017)
  - Religion: List: 94.7% Islam; 5.14% Christianity; 0.12% Ahmadiyya; 0.02% Hinduism; 0.01% Sikhism; 0.01% other
- Time zone: UTC+05:00 (PKT)
- Postal code: 53XXX – 55XXX
- Dialling code: 042
- Vehicle registration: List: LH; LHA; LHB; LHC; LHD; LHE; LHF; LHG; LHH; LHJ; LHK; LHL; LHP
- GDP (PPP): $84 billion (2019)
- International airport: Allama Iqbal International Airport (LHE)
- Rapid Transit: Lahore Metrobus
- Police: Capital City Police Lahore
- Development Authority: Lahore Development Authority
- HDI (2018): 0.877 (very high) · 3rd
- Growth: ▲8.06%
- Literacy (2023): 81%
- Constituencies in the National Assembly: 14 / 336
- Sex ratio (2017): 912 ♀/1000 ♂
- Climate: BSh
- Abbreviation: LHR/ایل ایچ آر
- Patron saint: Ali al-Hujwiri
- Website: lahore.punjab.gov.pk

UNESCO World Heritage Site
- Official name: Fort and Shalamar Gardens in Lahore
- Criteria: Cultural: (i)(ii)(iii)
- Reference: 171-002
- Inscription: 1981 (5th Session)
- Extensions: 2009
- Area: 36 ha (89 acres)

Lahore (Note: /ləˈhɔːr/ lə-HOR; Punjabi: لہور [lɔː˥˩ɾᵊ]; Urdu: لاہور [laːˈɦɔːɾ]) is the capital and largest city of the Pakistani province of Punjab. It is the second-largest city in Pakistan, after Karachi, and 27th largest in the world, with a population of over 14 million. Lahore is one of the country's major industrial, educational and economic hubs, and is considered the historic capital and cultural centre of the wider Punjab region.

The site of the city has been inhabited for over two millennia, although Lahore itself rose to prominence in the late 10th century. At times Lahore has served as the capital of several empires, including the Odi Shahi dynasty, Ghaznavid Empire and Delhi Sultanate. It was one of the principal cities in the Mughal Empire, being its capital city during the reign of Akbar. During this period, it was one of the largest cities in the world. In the 18th century Lahore fell into a period of decay while being contested among the Durranis and the Sikhs; it regained some of its former grandeur when it became capital of the Sikh Kingdom of Lahore in the early 19th century. It was annexed by the East India Company in 1849 and became the capital of Punjab Province. Lahore was central to the independence movements of British India, with the city being the site of both the Declaration of Indian Independence and the resolution for the establishment of Pakistan. It suffered rioting during the partition of British India in 1947. Following the independence of Pakistan, Lahore remained the capital of Punjab province.

Lahore is located in central-eastern Punjab, along the Ravi River, and has a strong cultural and political influence over the country being capital of its most populated province. It is considered a major socially liberal, progressive, and cosmopolitan city in the country. It is a UNESCO City of Literature and major centre for Pakistan's publishing industry, and is as such a foremost centre of Pakistan's literary scene. The city is also a major centre of education, with some of the country's leading universities based there. Lahore is home to Pakistan's Punjabi film industry, and is a major centre of Qawwali music. The city hosts a significant portion of Pakistan's tourism industry, with major attractions including the Walled City, the Badshahi and Wazir Khan mosques, as well as several Sikh and Sufi shrines. Lahore is also home to the Lahore Fort and Shalimar Gardens, both of which are UNESCO World Heritage Sites.

== Etymology ==
The origin of Lahore's name is unclear. The city's name has been variously recorded by early Muslim historians as Luhawar, Lūhār, and Rahwar. The Iranian polymath and geographer, Abu Rayhan al-Biruni, referred to the city as Luhāwar in his 11th century work, Qanun, while the poet Amir Khusrow, who lived during the Delhi Sultanate period, recorded the city's name as Lāhanūr. Yaqut al-Hamawi records the city's name as Lawhūr, mentioning that it was famously known as Lahāwar. Persian historian Firishta mentions the city as Alahwar in his work, with al-Ahwar being another variation.

One theory suggests that Lahore's name is a corruption of the word Ravāwar, as R to L shifts are common in languages derived from Sanskrit. Ravāwar is the simplified pronunciation of the name Iravatyāwar, a name possibly derived from the Ravi River, known as the Iravati River in the Vedas. Another theory suggests the city's name may derive from the word Lohar, meaning "blacksmith".

== History ==
Historical affiliations

Taank Kingdom 550–950
Hindu Shahis 1001–1020
Ghaznavids Empire 1020–1186
Ghurid Empire 1186–1206
Delhi Sultanate 1206–1214
Multan State 1214–1217
Delhi Sultanate 1217–1223
Khwarazmian Empire 1223–1228
Delhi Sultanate 1228–1241
Mongol Empire 1241– 1266
Delhi Sultanate 1266–1287
Chagatai Khanate 1287–1305
Delhi Sultanate 1305–1329
Chagatai Khanate 1329
Delhi Sultanate 1329–1342
Khokhar Confederacy 1342
Delhi Sultanate 1342–1394
Khokhar Confederacy 1394–1398
Timurid Empire 1398–1414
Delhi Sultanate 1414–1431
Khokhar Confederacy 1431–1432
Delhi Sultanate 1432–1524
Mughal Empire 1524–1540
Sur Empire 1540–1555
Mughal Empire 1555–1739
Afsharid Empire 1739
Mughal Empire 1739–1748
Durrani Empire 1748–1758
Maratha Empire 1758–1759
Durrani Empire 1759–1765
Bhangi Misl and Kanhaiya Misl 1765–1799
Sikh Empire 1799–1849
British East India Company 1849–1858
British Raj / British Empire 1858–1947
Pakistan 1947–present

=== Origins ===
No definitive record of Lahore's early history exists, and its ambiguous historical background has given rise to various theories about its establishment and history.

Alexander the Great's historians make no mention of any city near Lahore's location during his invasion in 326 BCE, suggesting the city had not been founded by that point or was not noteworthy. Ptolemy mentions in his Geography a city called Labokla situated near the Chenab and Ravi rivers which may have been in reference to ancient Lahore, or an abandoned predecessor of the city. Chinese pilgrim Xuanzang gave a vivid description of a large and prosperous unnamed city that may have been Lahore when he visited the region in 630 CE during his tour of India.

The first document that mentions Lahore by name is the Hudud al-'Alam ("The Regions of the World"), written in 982 CE, in which Lahore is mentioned as a town which had "impressive temples, large markets and huge orchards".

Few other references to Lahore remain from before its capture by the Ghaznavid Sultan Mahmud in the 11th century. During this time, Lahore appears to have served as the capital of Punjab under maharaja Anandapala of the Odi Shahi dynasty, who moved his capital there from Udabhandapura.

=== Mediaeval era ===
==== Ghaznavid ====
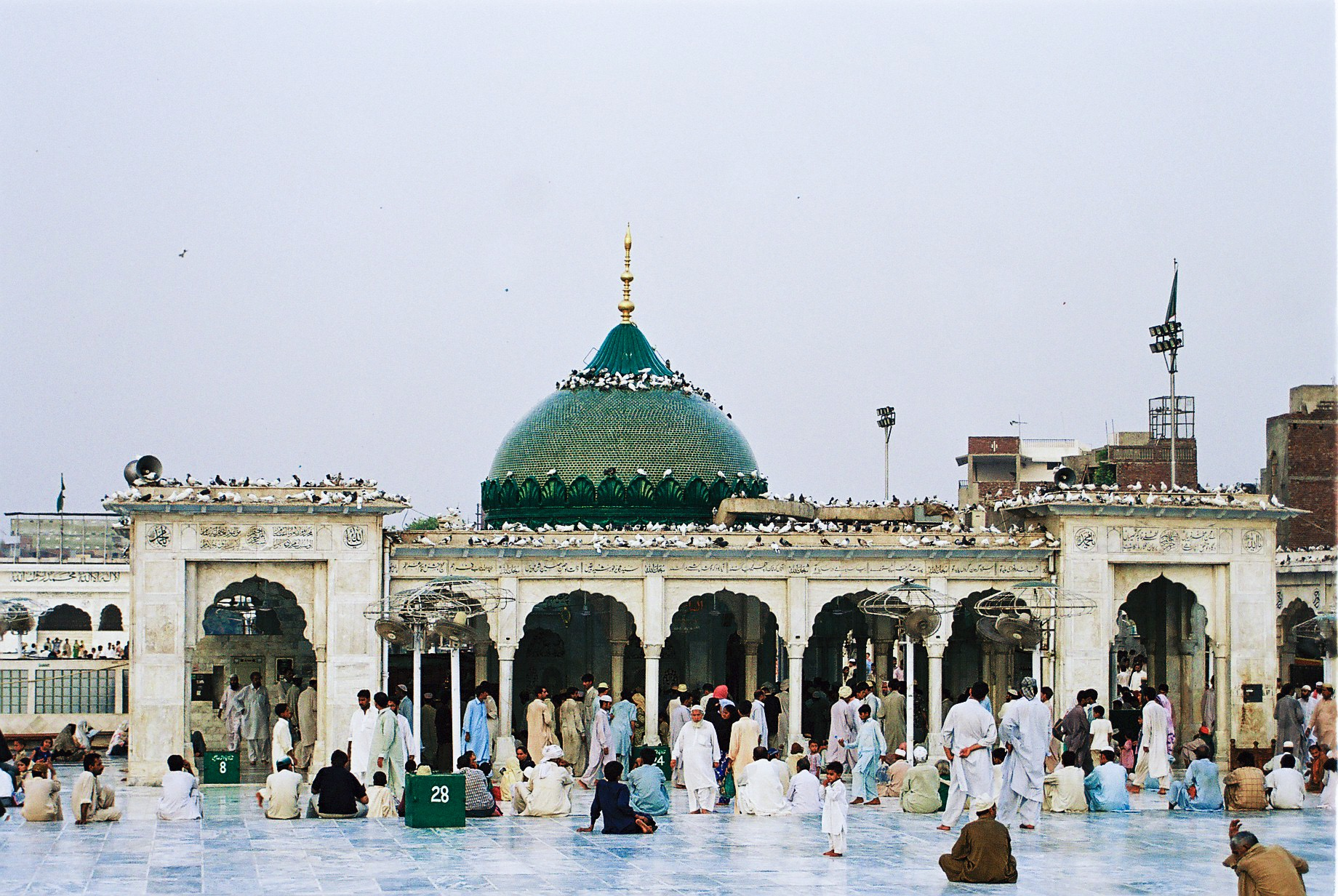
The Data Darbar shrine was built to commemorate saint Ali Hujwiri, who lived in the city during 11th century.

Sultan Mahmud conquered Lahore between 1020 and 1027, making it part of Ghaznavid Empire. He appointed Malik Ayaz as its governor in 1021. During the reign of Sultan Ibrahim, Malik Ayaz rebuilt and repopulated the city, which had been devastated after the Ghaznavid invasion. He also erected city walls and a masonry fort in 1037–1040 on the ruins of a previous one. During his tenure a confederation of Hindu princes unsuccessfully laid siege to Lahore in 1043–44.

Lahore was formally made the eastern capital of Ghaznavid Empire during the reign of Khusrau Shah in 1152. After the fall of Ghazni in 1163, It became the sole capital. Under their patronage, poets and scholars from other cities of Ghaznavid Empire congregated in Lahore. The city became a cultural and academic centre, renowned for poetry. The entire city of Lahore during the Ghaznavid era was probably located west of the modern Shah Alami Bazaar and north of the Bhatti Gate.

==== Mamluk ====
Following the siege of Lahore in 1186, the Ghurid ruler Muhammad captured the city and imprisoned Khusrau Malik, thus ending Ghaznavid rule over Lahore. Lahore was the first capital of the Mamluk dynasty of what would later come to be known as the Delhi Sultanate following the assassination of Muhammad of Ghor in 1206. Under the reign of Mamluk sultan Qutb ud-Din Aibak, Lahore attracted poets and scholars from medieval Muslim World. Lahore at this time had more poets writing in Persian than any other city. Following the death of Aibak, Lahore first came under the control of the governor of Multan, Nasir ad-Din Qabacha, and then was briefly captured in 1217 by the sultan in Delhi, Iltutmish.

In an alliance with local Khokhars in 1223, the Khwarazmian sultan Jalal al-Din Mangburni captured Lahore after fleeing from Genghis Khan's invasion of his realm. Mangburni then fled from Lahore to the city of Uch after Iltutmish's army re-captured Lahore in 1228.

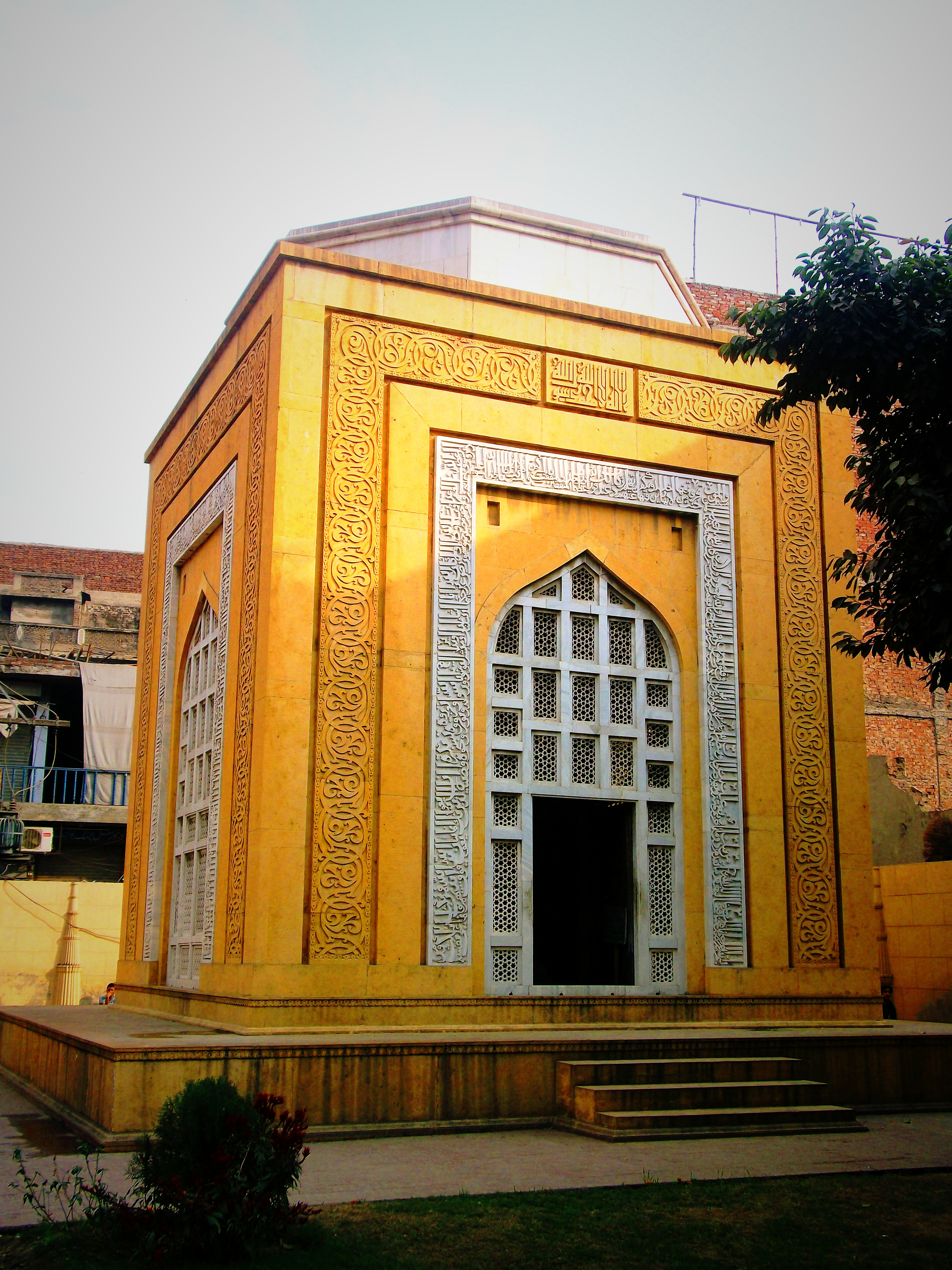
Tomb of Qutb-ud-Din Aybak in Anarkali Bazaar, Lahore

The threat of Mongol invasions and political instability in Lahore caused future sultans to regard Delhi as a safer capital for the sultanate, even though Delhi was considered a forward base while Lahore was widely considered as the centre of Islamic culture in northeastern Punjab.

Lahore came under progressively weaker central rule under Iltutmish's descendants in Delhi, to the point that governors in the city acted with great autonomy. Actual Sultanate rule on Lahore lasted only a few decades until the locals reclaimed their autonomy. Lahore was sacked and ruined by the Mongol army in 1241, with the Mongols holding the city for a few years under the rule of the Mongol chief Toghrul.

In 1266, sultan Balban reconquered Lahore, but in 1287 under the Mongol ruler Temür Khan, the Mongols again overran northern Punjab. Because of Mongol invasions, Lahore region became a city on a frontier, with the region's administrative centre shifted south to Dipalpur. The Mongols again invaded northern Punjab in 1298, though their advance was eventually stopped by Ulugh Khan, brother of sultan Alauddin Khalji of Delhi. The Mongols again attacked Lahore in 1305.

==== Tughluq ====
Lahore briefly flourished again under the reign of Ghiyath al-Din Tughlaq (Ghazi Malik) of the Tughlaq dynasty between 1320 and 1325, though the city was again sacked in 1329 by Tarmashirin of the Central Asian Chagatai Khanate, and then again by the Mongol chief Hülechü. Khokhars seized Lahore in 1342, but the city was retaken by Ghazi Malik's son, Muhammad bin Tughlaq. The weakened city then fell into obscurity and was captured once more by the Khokhar chief Shaikha in 1394. By the time the Mongol conqueror Timur captured the city in 1398 from Shaikha, he did not loot it because it was no longer wealthy.

==== Late Sultanates ====
Timur gave control of the Lahore region to Khizr Khan, governor of Multan, who later established the Sayyid dynasty in 1414, the fourth dynasty of the Delhi Sultanate. The city was twice besieged by Jasrat, the ruler of Sialkot, during the reign of Mubarak Shah II, the longest of which being in 1431–32. To combat Jasrat, the city was granted by the Sayyid dynasty to Bahlul Lodi in 1441, though Lodi would then displace the Sayyids in 1451 by establishing himself upon the throne of Delhi.

Bahlul Lodi installed his cousin, Tatar Khan, to be governor of the city, though Tatar Khan died in battle with Sikandar Lodi in 1485. Governorship of Lahore was transferred by Sikandar Lodi to Umar Khan Sarwani, who quickly left the management of this city to his son Said Khan Sarwani. Said Khan was removed from power in 1500 by Sikandar Lodi, and Lahore came under the governorship of Daulat Lodi, son of Tatar Khan and former employer of Guru Nanak, the founder of Sikhism.

=== Mughals ===
==== Early Mughal ====
Babur, the founder of the Mughal Empire, captured and sacked Lahore and Dipalpur, in 1525. The city became a refuge to Humayun and his brother Kamran Mirza when Sher Shah Suri rose in power in the Gangetic plains, displacing Mughals. Sher Shah Suri seized Lahore in 1540, though Humayun reconquered Lahore in February 1555. The establishment of Mughal rule eventually led to the most prosperous era of Lahore's history. Lahore's prosperity and central position has yielded more Mughal-era monuments in Lahore than either Delhi or Agra.

By the time of the rule of the Mughal empire's greatest emperors, a majority of Lahore's residents did not live within the walled city itself but instead lived in suburbs that had spread outside the city's walls. Only 9 of the 36 urban quarters around Lahore, known as guzars, were located within the city walls during the Akbar period. During this period, Lahore was closely tied to smaller market towns known as qasbahs, such as Kasur and Eminabad, as well as Amritsar and Batala in modern-day India, which in turn, linked to supply chains in villages surrounding each qasbah.

==== Akbar ====
Beginning in 1584, Lahore became the Mughal capital when Akbar began re-fortifying the city's ruined citadel, laying the foundations for the revival of the Lahore Fort. A Lahore-born commander, Shahbaz Khan Kamboh was one of his foremost generals. Akbar made Lahore one of his original twelve subah or provinces, and in 1585–86, relegated governorship of the city and subah to Bhagwant Das, brother of Mariam-uz-Zamani, who was commonly known as "Jodhabhai".

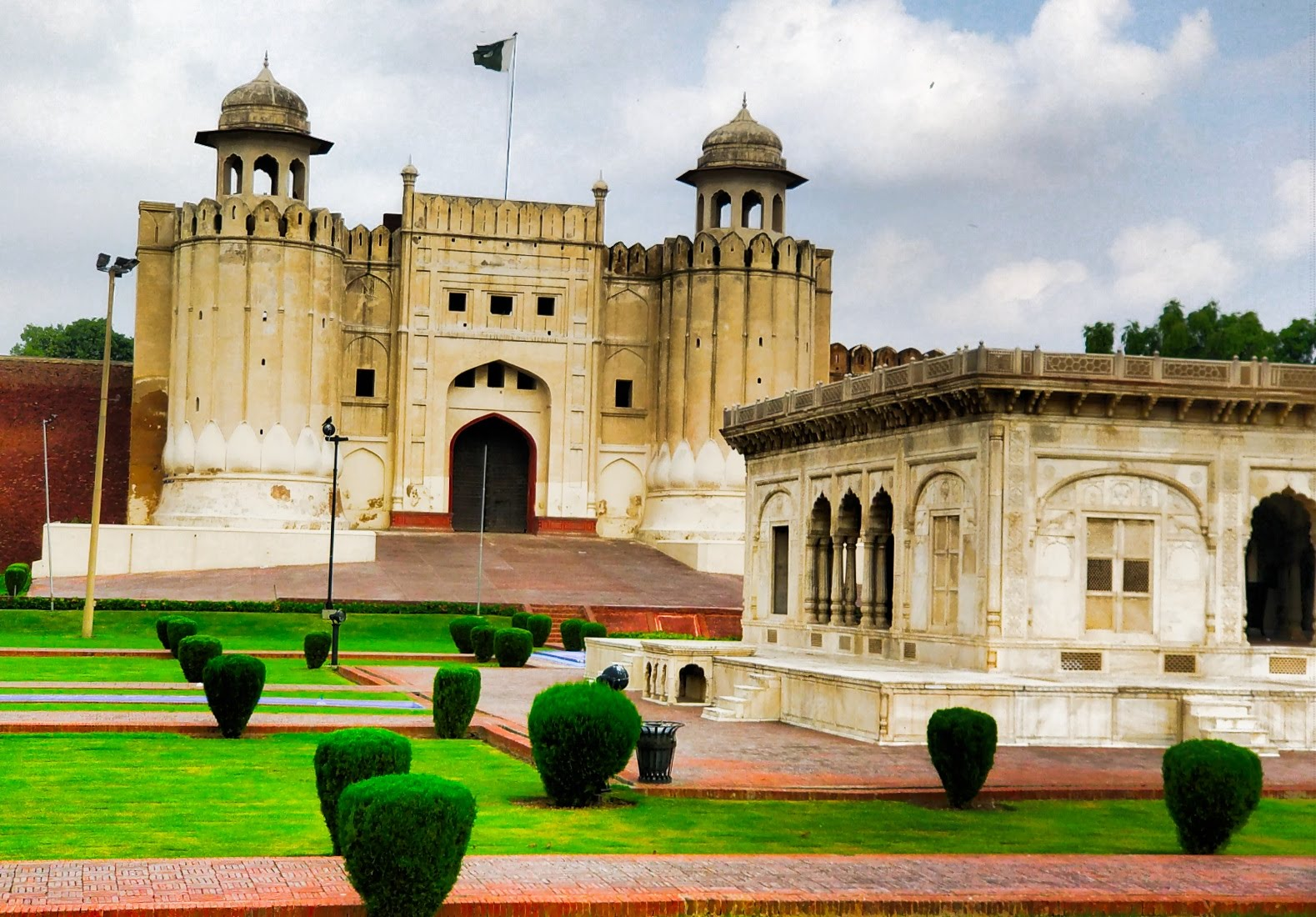
The Alamgiri Gate of the Lahore Fort

Akbar also rebuilt the city's walls and extended their perimeter east of the Shah Alami bazaar to encompass the sparsely populated area of Rarra Maidan. The Akbari Mandi grain market was set up during this era, which continues to function to the present-day. Akbar also established the Dharampura neighbourhood in the early 1580s, which survives today. The earliest of Lahore's many havelis date from the Akbari era.

==== Jahangir ====
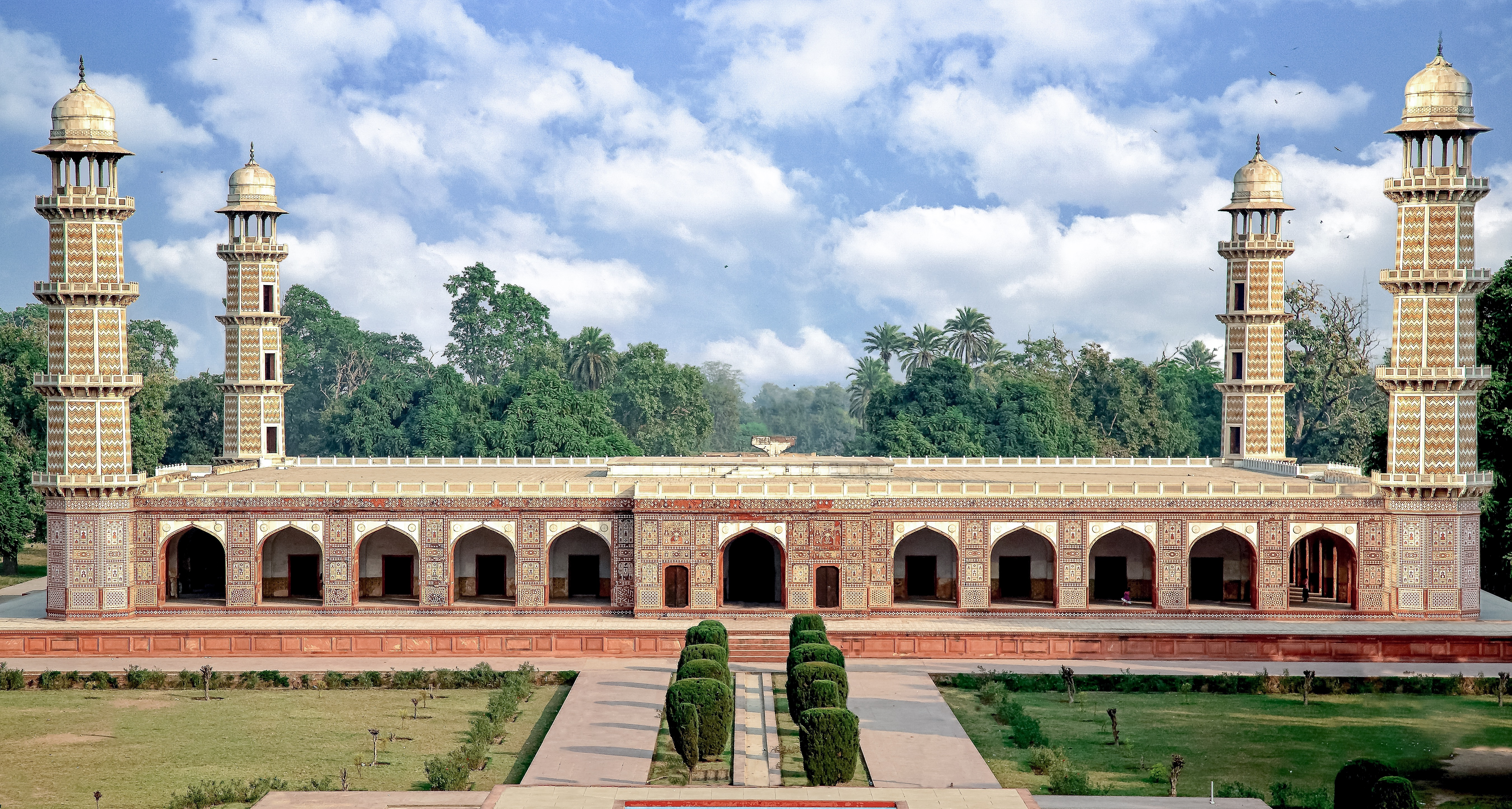
The mausoleum of Jahangir in Shahdara Bagh

During the reign of Emperor Jahangir in the early 17th century, Lahore's bazaars were noted to be vibrant, frequented by foreigners, and stocked with a wide array of goods. In 1606, Jahangir's rebel son Khusrau Mirza laid siege to Lahore after obtaining the blessings of the Sikh Guru Arjan Dev. Jahangir quickly defeated his son at Bhairowal, and the roots of Mughal–Sikh animosity grew. Sikh Guru Arjan Dev was executed in Lahore in 1606 for his involvement in the rebellion. Jahangir chose to be buried in Lahore, and his tomb was built in Lahore's Shahdara Bagh suburb in 1637 by his wife Nur Jahan, whose tomb is also nearby.

==== Shah Jahan ====
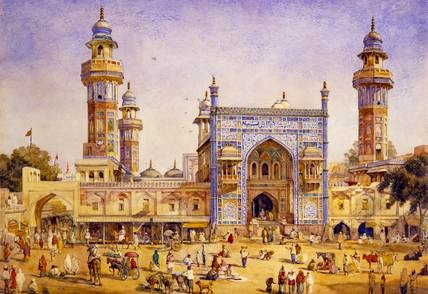
Wazir Khan Mosque painting by William Carpenter (1866)

Jahangir's son, Shah Jahan (reigned 1628–1658), was born in Lahore in 1592. He renovated large portions of the Lahore Fort with luxurious white marble and erected the iconic Naulakha Pavilion in 1633. Shah Jahan lavished Lahore with some of its most celebrated and iconic monuments, such as the Shalamar Gardens in 1641. His Punjabi viceroy and royal physician Wazir Khan also built a number of monuments in the city, including the richly decorated Wazir Khan Mosque, the Wazir Khan Baradari, and the Shahi Hammam, during his tenure. The population of pre-modern Lahore probably reached its zenith during his reign, with suburban districts home to perhaps 6 times as many compared to within the Walled City.

==== Aurangzeb ====
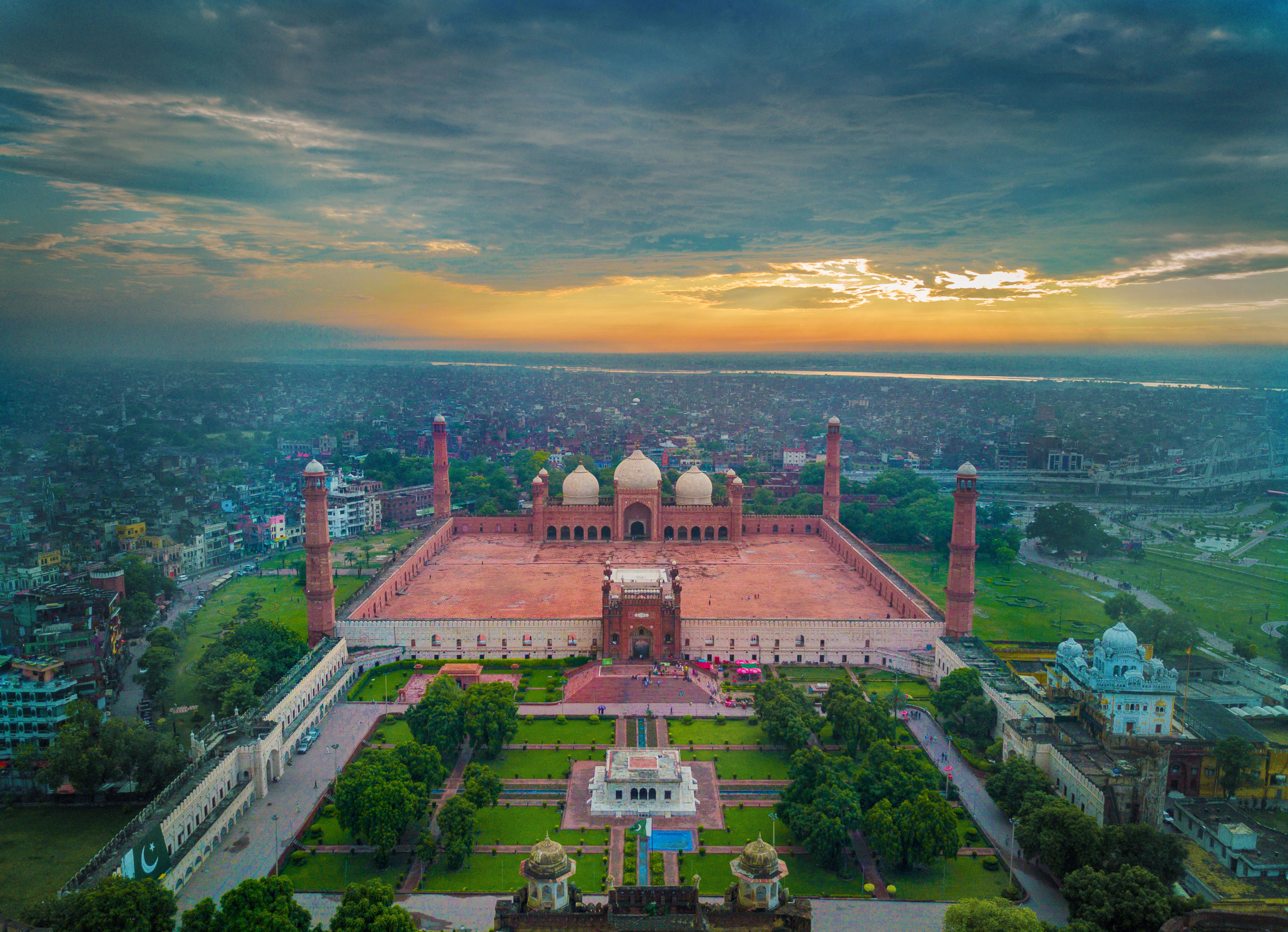
Aerial view of Badshahi Mosque

Shah Jahan's son, Aurangzeb, last of the great Mughal Emperors, further contributed to the development of Lahore. Aurangzeb built the Alamgiri Bund embankment along the Ravi river in 1662 to prevent its shifting course from threatening the city's walls. The area near the embankment grew into a fashionable locality, with several nearby pleasure gardens laid by Lahore's gentry. The largest of Lahore's Mughal monuments, the Badshahi Mosque, was raised during Aurangzeb's reign in 1673, as well as the iconic Alamgiri Gate of the Lahore fort in 1674.

==== Late Mughal ====
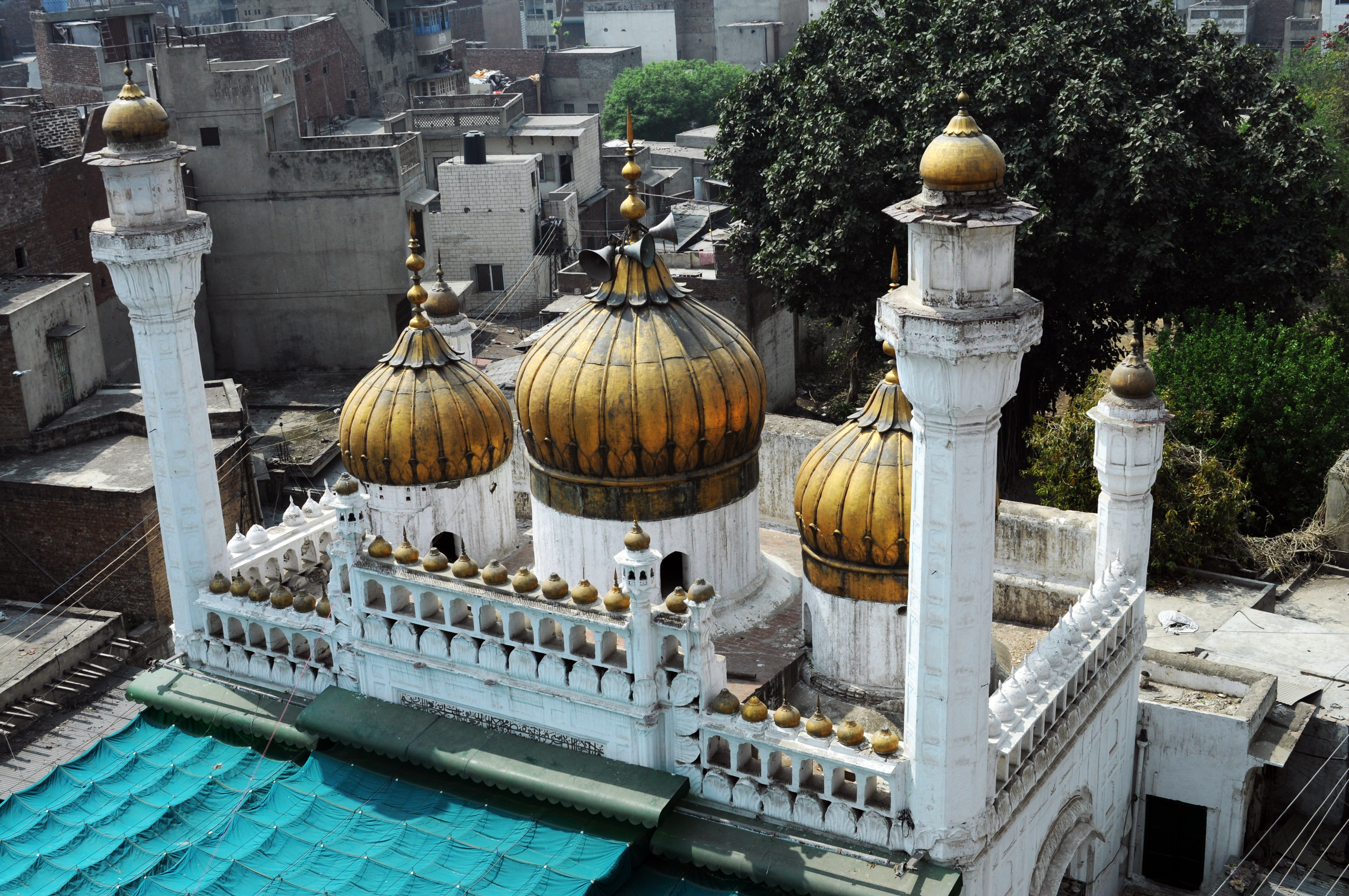
The Sunehri Mosque was built in the walled city in the early 18th century, when the Mughal Empire was in decline.

Civil wars regarding succession to the Mughal throne following Aurangzeb's death in 1707 led to weakening control over Lahore from Delhi, and a prolonged period of decline in Lahore. Mughal preoccupation with the Marathas in the Deccan Plateau eventually resulted in Lahore being governed by a series of governors who pledged nominal allegiance to the ever-weaker Mughal emperors in Delhi.

Mughal Emperor Bahadur Shah I died enroute to Lahore as part of a campaign in 1711 to subdue Sikh rebels under the leadership of Banda Singh Bahadur. His sons fought a battle outside Lahore in 1712 for succession to the Mughal crown, with Jahandar winning the throne. Sikh rebels were defeated during the reign of Farrukhsiyar when Abd as-Samad and Zakariyya Khan suppressed them.

Nader Shah's brief invasion of the Mughal Empire in early 1739 wrested control away from Zakariya Khan Bahadur. Though Khan was able to win back control after the Persian armies had left, the trade routes had shifted away from Lahore, and south towards Kandahar instead. Indus ports near the Arabian Sea that served Lahore also silted up during this time, reducing the city's importance even further.

Struggles between Zakariyya Khan's sons following his death in 1745 further weakened Muslim control over Lahore, thus leaving the city in a power vacuum, and vulnerable to foreign marauders.

=== Durrani invasions ===
The Durrani ruler Ahmad Shah occupied Lahore in 1748. Following Ahmed Shah Durrani's quick retreat, the Mughals entrusted Lahore to Mu'īn al-Mulk Mir Mannu. Ahmad Shah again invaded in 1751, forcing Mir Mannu into signing a treaty that nominally subjected Lahore to Durrani rule. Lahore was third time conquered by Ahmad Shah in 1752. The Mughal Grand Vizier Ghazi-ud-Din Imad al-Mulk seized Lahore in 1756, provoking Ahmad Shah to invade for fourth time in 1757, after which he placed the city under the rule of his son, Timur Shah.

Durrani rule was interrupted when Lahore was conquered by Adina Beg Arain with the assistance of Marathas in 1758 during their campaigns against Afghans. After Adina Beg's untimely death in 1758, however, Marathas temporarily occupied the city. The following year, the Durranis again marched into Lahore and conquered it. After the Durranis withdrew from the city in 1765, Sikh forces quickly occupied it. By this time, the city had been ravaged several time and had lost all of its former grandeur. The Durranis invaded two more times — in 1797 and 1798 — under Shah Zaman, but the Sikhs re-occupied the city after both invasions as the Durranis were forced to attend to other problems on their western borders.

=== Sikh ===
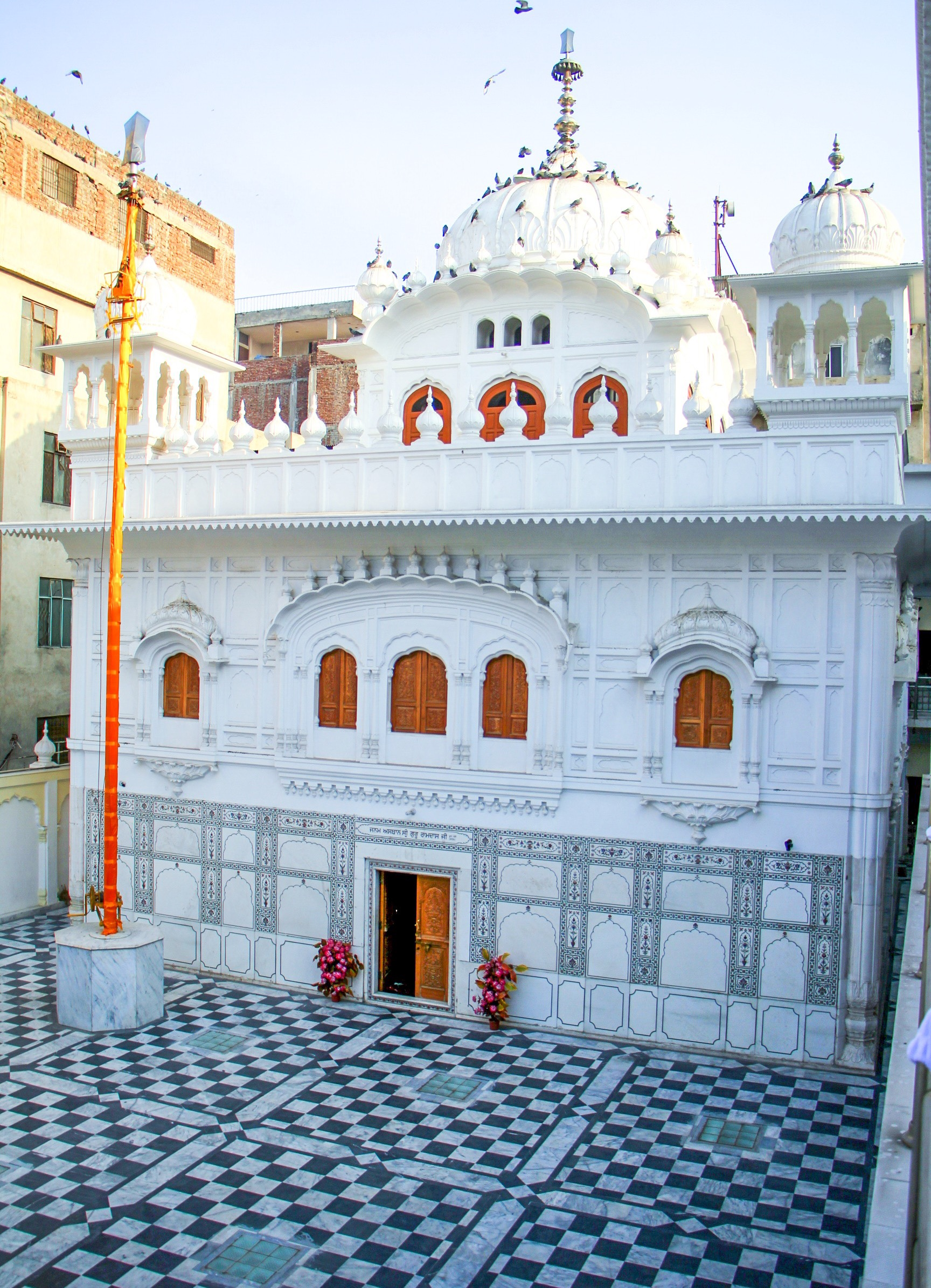
Gurdwara Janam Asthan Guru Ram Das

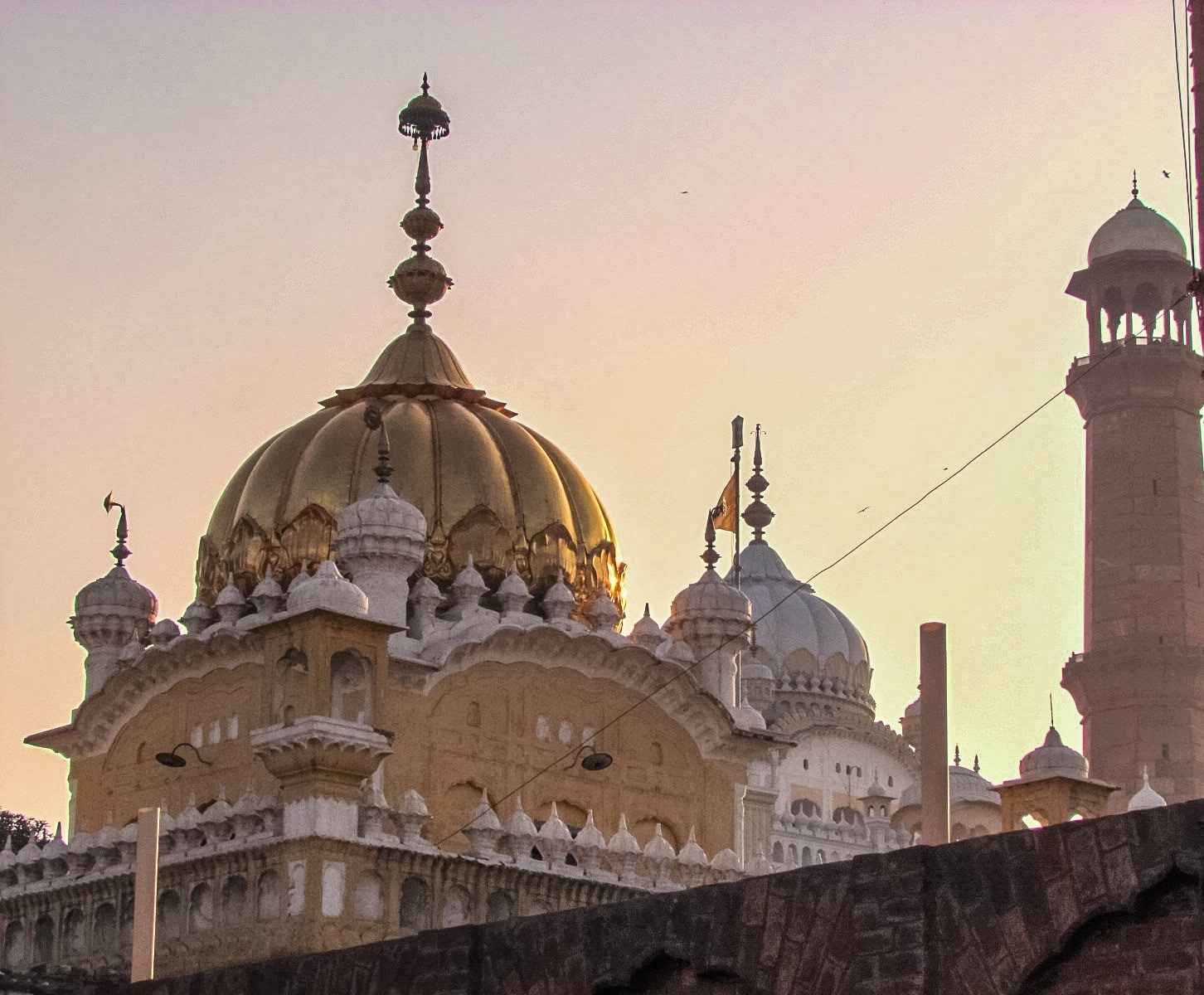
Gurdwara Dera Sahib

==== Early ====
Expanding Sikh Misls secured control over Lahore in 1767, when the Bhangi Misl state captured the city. In 1780, the city was divided among three rulers: Gujjar Singh, Lahna Singh, and Sobha Singh. Instability resulting from this arrangement allowed nearby Amritsar to establish itself as the area's primary commercial centre in place of Lahore.

Ahmad Shah Durrani's grandson, Zaman Shah, captured Lahore in 1796, and again in 1798–99. Ranjit Singh negotiated with the Afghans for the post of subahdar to control Lahore following the second invasion.

By the end of the 18th century, the city's population drastically declined, with its remaining residents living within the city walls, while the extramural suburbs lay abandoned, forcing travellers to pass through abandoned and ruined suburbs for a few miles before reaching the city's gates.

==== Sikh Empire ====
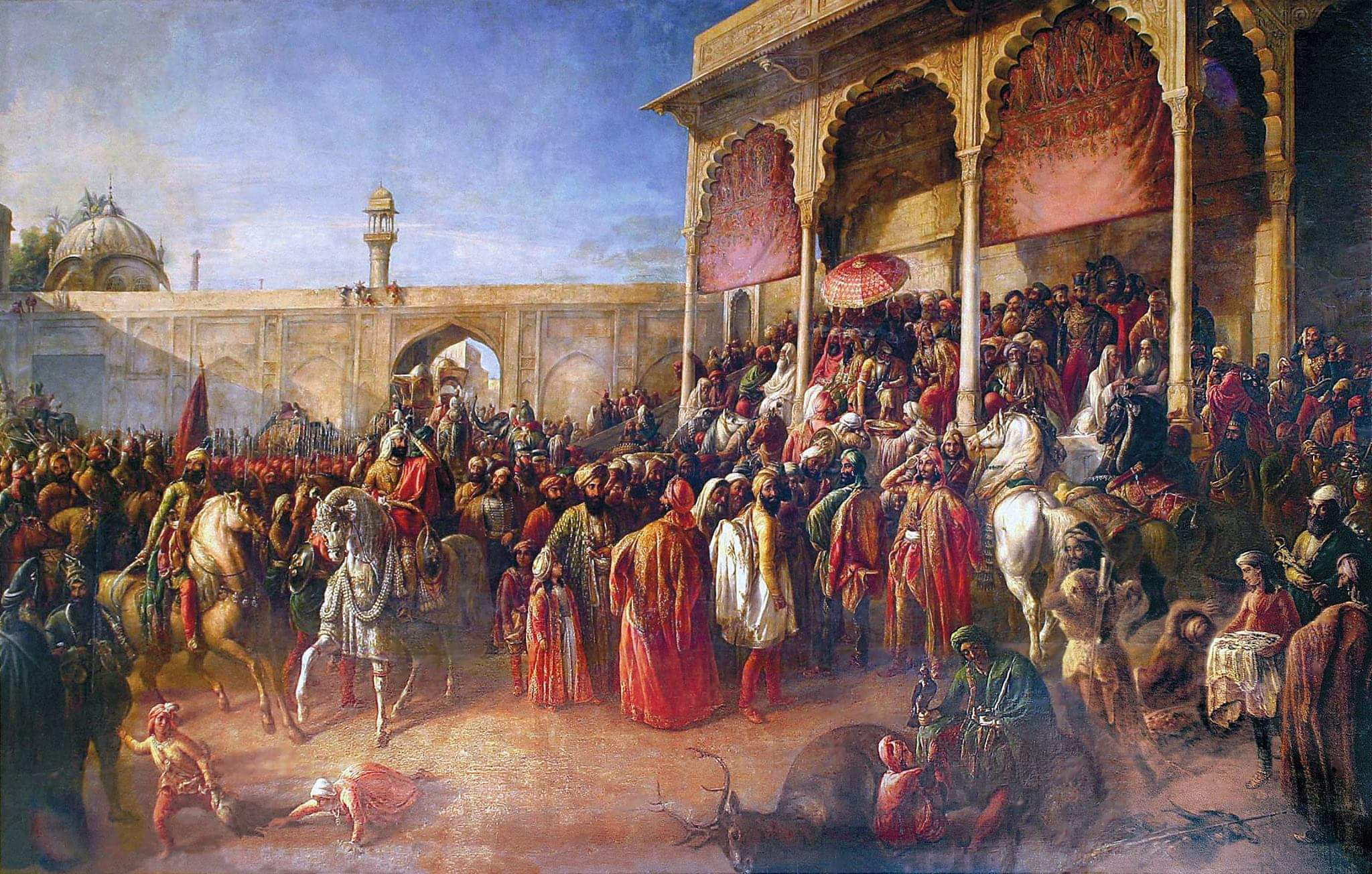
The Lahore Darbar by Ágoston Schoefft (1842)

In the aftermath of Zaman Shah's 1799 invasion of Punjab, Ranjit Singh, of nearby Gujranwala, began to consolidate his position. Singh was able to seize control of the region after a series of battles with the Bhangi chiefs who had seized Lahore in 1780. His army marched to Anarkali, where according to tradition, the gatekeeper of the Lohari Gate, Mukham Din Chaudhry, opened the gates allowing Ranjit Singh's army to enter Lahore. After capturing Lahore, Sikh soldiers immediately began plundering Muslim areas of the city until their actions were reined in by Ranjit Singh.

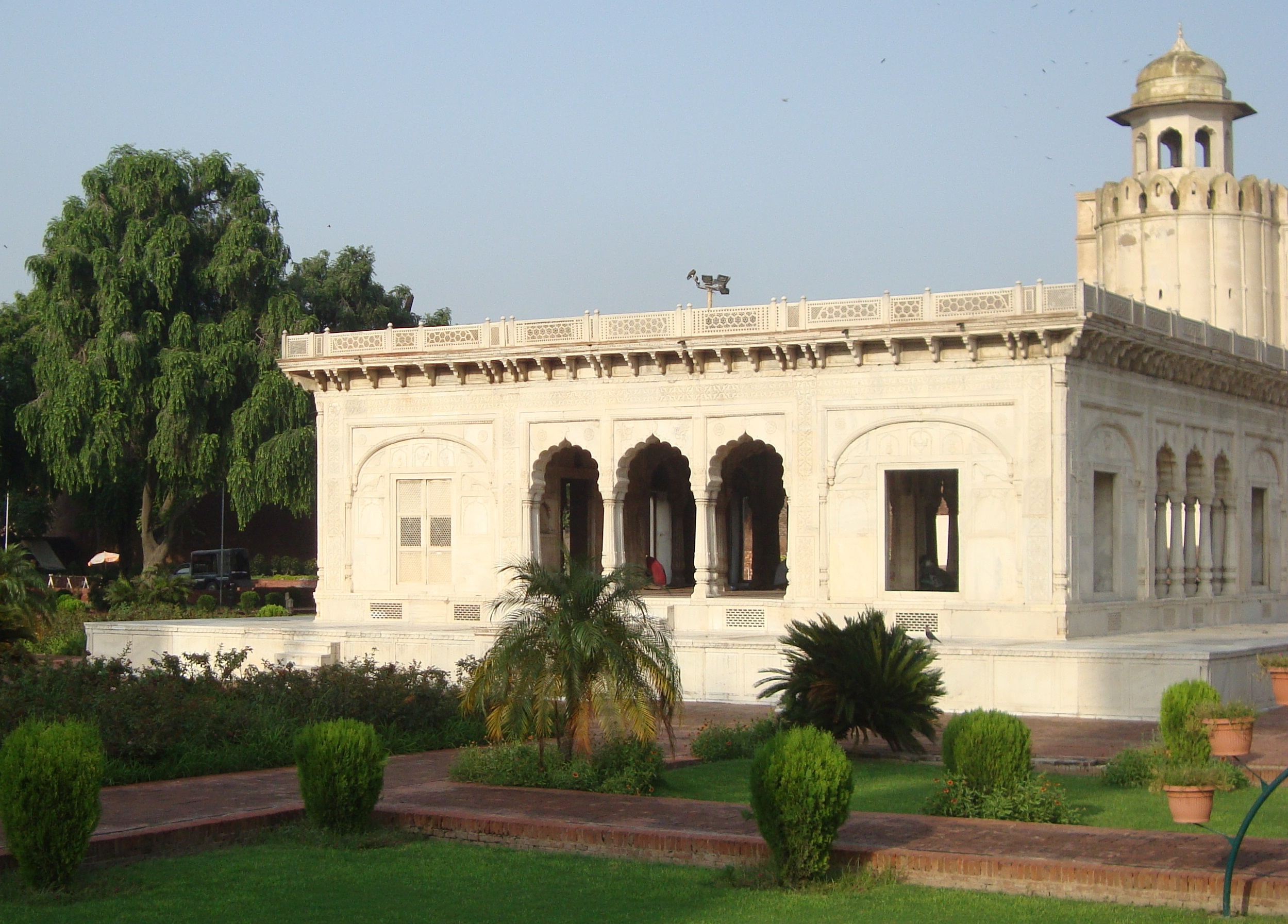
The marble Hazuri Bagh Baradari was built in 1818 to celebrate Ranjit Singh's acquisition of the Koh-i-Noor diamond.

Ranjit Singh's rule restored some of Lahore's lost grandeur, but at the expense of destroying the remaining Mughal architecture for building materials. He established a mint in the city in 1800, and moved into the Mughal palace at the Lahore fort after repurposing it for his own use in governing the Sikh Empire. In 1801, he established a Gurdwara Ram Das to mark the site where Guru Ram Das was born in 1534.

Lahore became the empire's administrative capital, though the nearby economic centre of Amritsar had also been established as the empire's spiritual capital by 1802. By 1812, Singh had mostly refurbished the city's defences by adding a second circuit of outer walls surrounding Akbar's original walls, with the two separated by a moat. Singh also partially restored Shah Jahan's decaying Shalimar Gardens and built the Hazuri Bagh Baradari in 1818 to celebrate his capture of the Koh-i-Noor diamond from Shuja Shah Durrani in 1813. He erected the Gurdwara Dera Sahib to mark the site of Guru Arjan Dev's death (1606). The Sikh royal court also endowed religious architecture in the city, including a number of Sikh gurdwaras, Hindu temples, and havelis.

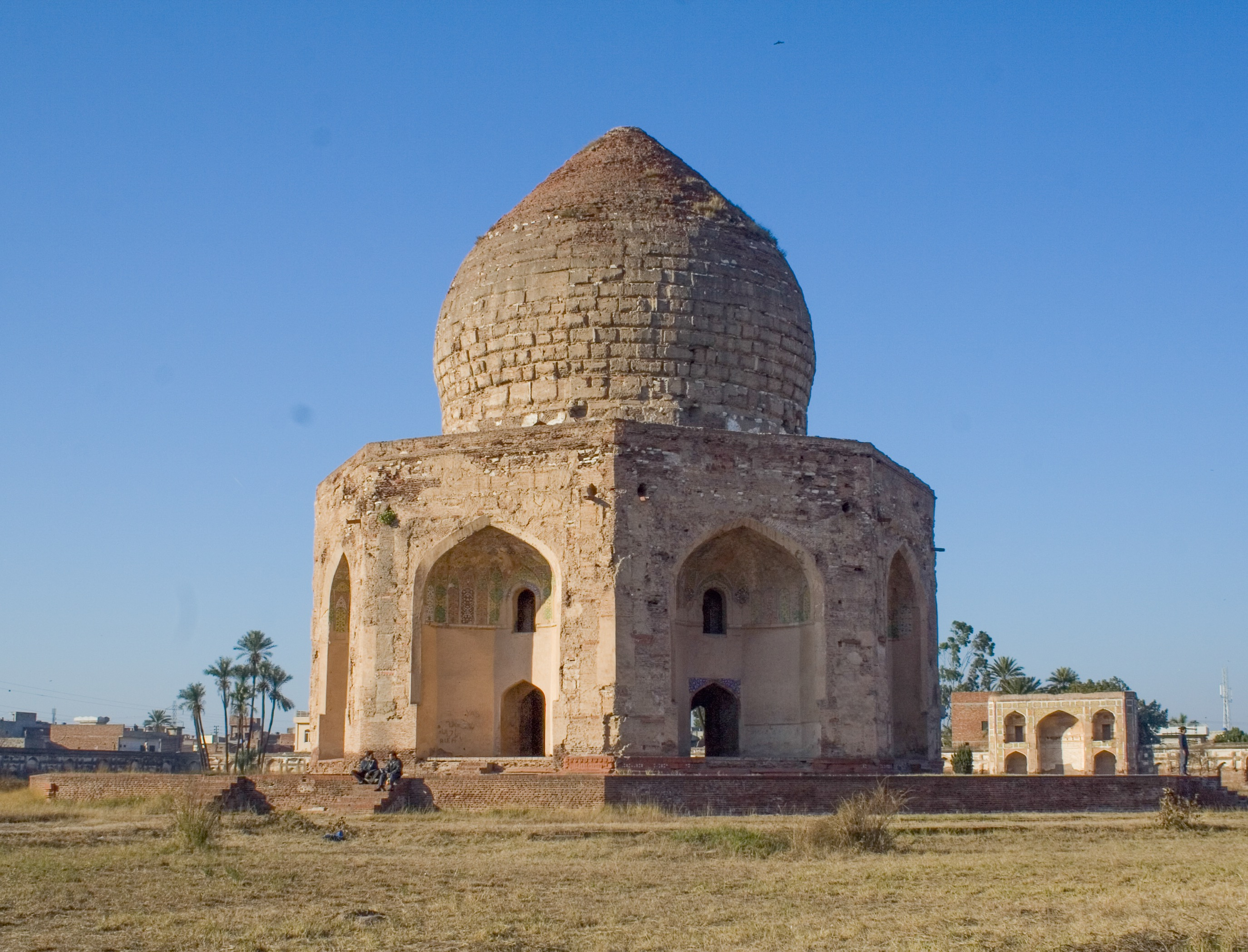
The Tomb of Asif Khan was one of several monuments plundered for its precious building materials during the Sikh period.

Under Ranjit Singh's rule, Mughal monuments suffered during the Sikh period as his armies plundered most of Lahore's most precious Mughal monuments, and stripped the white marble from several monuments to send to different parts of the Sikh Empire during his reign. Monuments plundered for decorative materials include the Tomb of Asif Khan, the Tomb of Nur Jahan, and the Shalimar Gardens. Ranjit Singh's army also desecrated the Badshahi Mosque by converting it into an ammunition depot and a stable for horses. The Sunehri Mosque in the Walled City was also converted to a gurdwara, while the Mariyam Zamani Mosque was repurposed into a gunpowder factory.

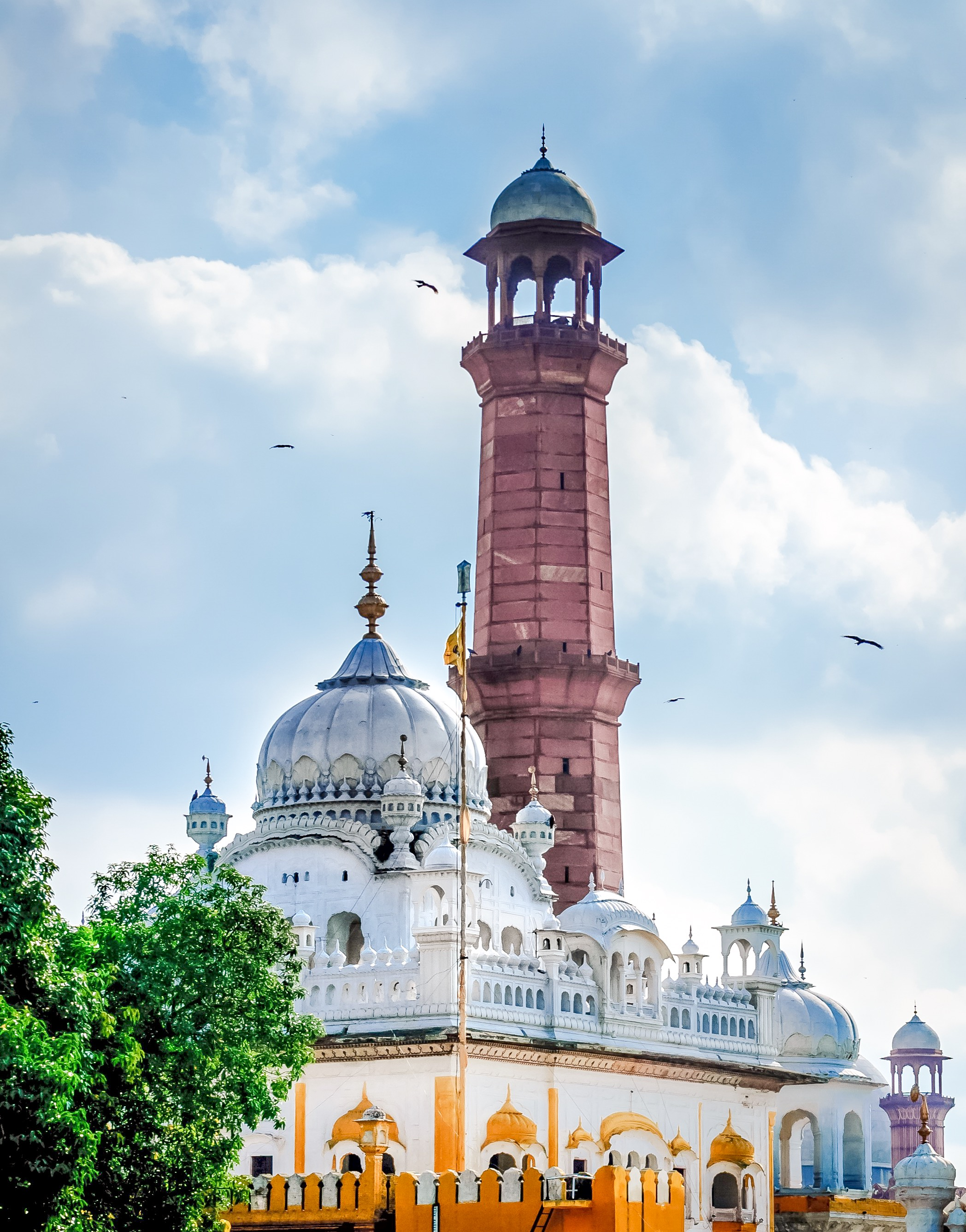
Samadhi of Ranjit Singh besides Badshahi Mosque

==== Late ====
The Lahore Durbar underwent a quick succession of rulers after the death of Ranjit Singh. His son Kharak Singh died on 6 November 1840, soon after taking the throne. On that same day, the next appointed successor to the throne, Nau Nihal Singh, died in an accident at the gardens of Hazuri Bagh. Maharaja Sher Singh was then selected as Maharajah, though his claim to the throne was quickly challenged by Chand Kaur, widow of Kharak Singh and mother of Nau Nihal Singh, who quickly seized the throne. Sher Singh raised an army that attacked Chand Kaur's forces in Lahore on 14 January 1841. His soldiers mounted weaponry on the minarets of the Badshahi Mosque to target Chand Kaur's forces in the Lahore fort, destroying the fort's historic Diwan-e-Aam. Kaur quickly ceded the throne, but Sher Sing was then assassinated in 1843 in Lahore's Chah Miran neighbourhood along with his wazir Dhiyan Singh. Dhyan Singh's son, Hira Singh, sought to avenge his father's death by laying siege to Lahore to capture his father's assassins. The siege resulted in the capture of his father's murderer, Ajit Singh.

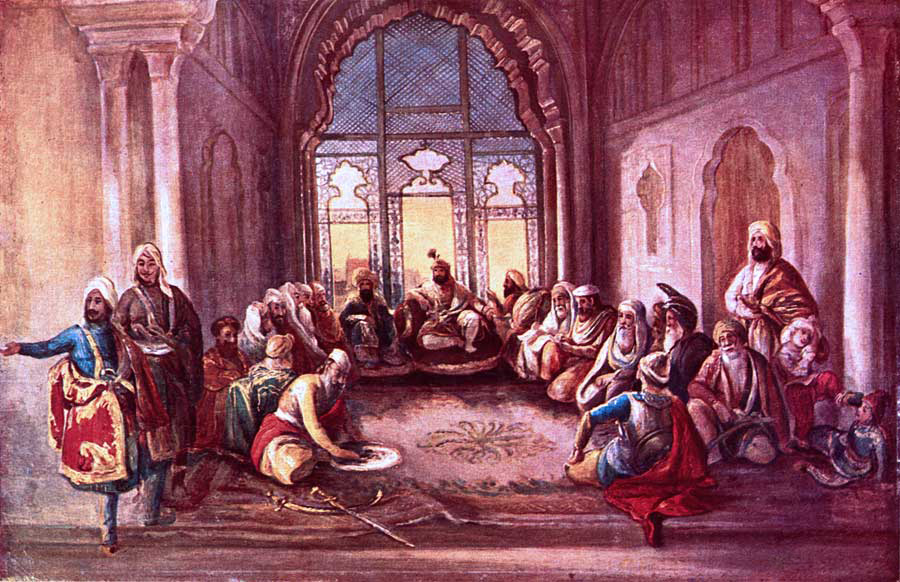
Maharaja Sher Singh attended by his council in Lahore Fort

Duleep Singh was then crowned Maharajah, with Hira Singh as his wazir, but his power would be weakened by the continued infighting among Sikh nobles, as well as confrontations against the British during the two Anglo-Sikh wars.

After the conclusion of the two Anglo-Sikh wars, the Sikh Empire fell into disarray, resulting in the fall of the Lahore Durbar, and commencement of British rule after they captured Lahore and the wider Punjab region.

=== British colonial period ===
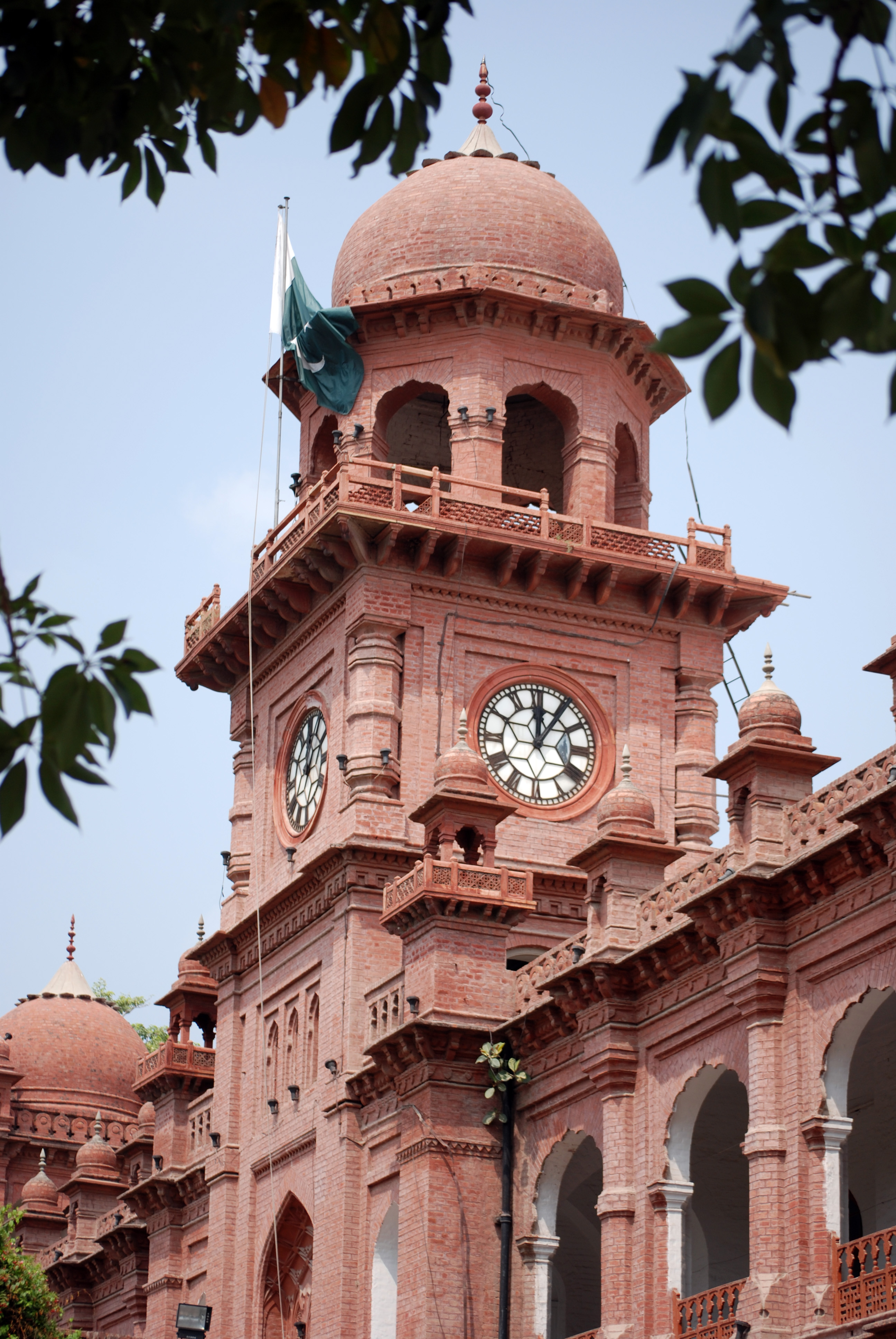
University of the Punjab

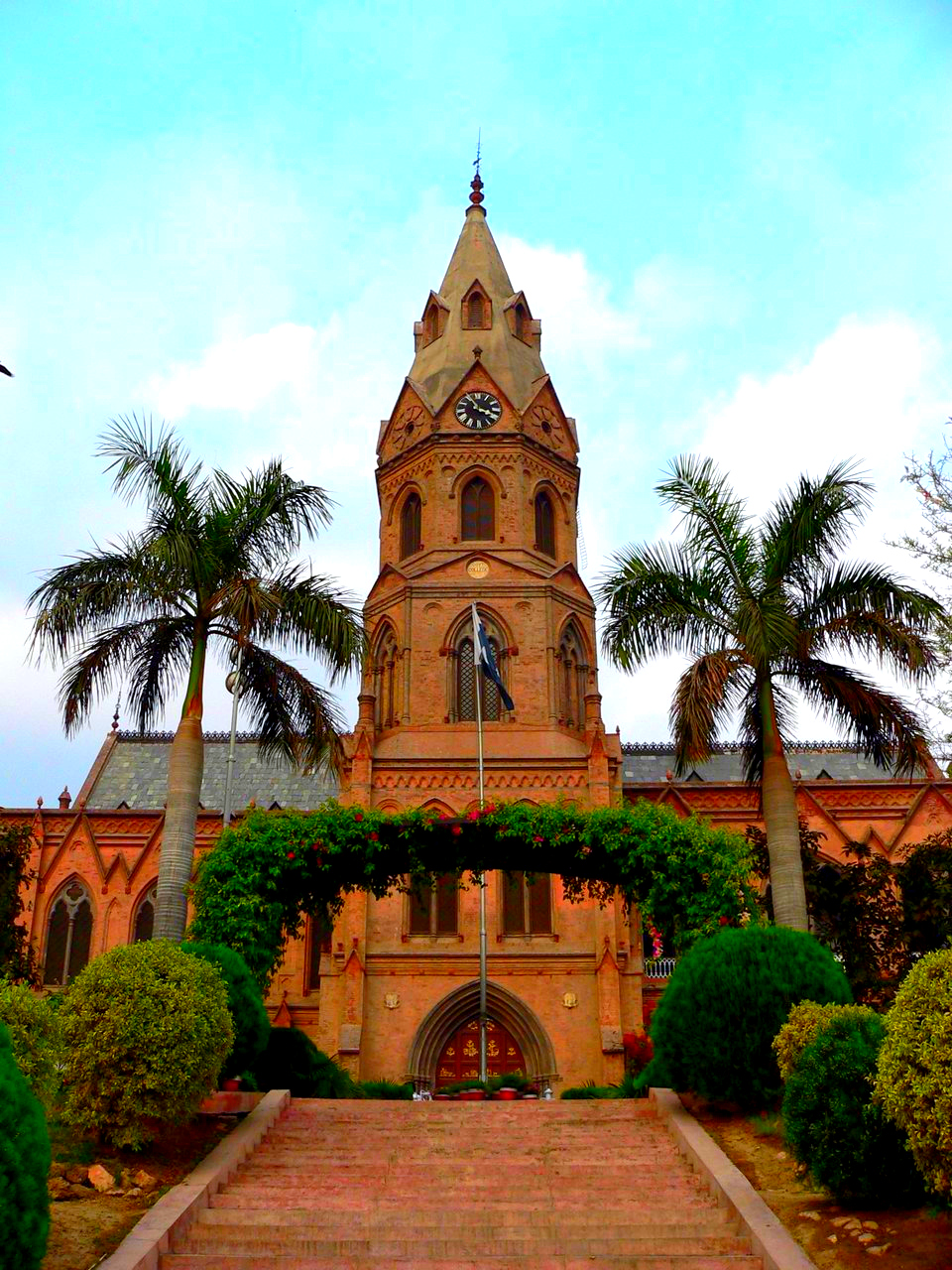
Government College University

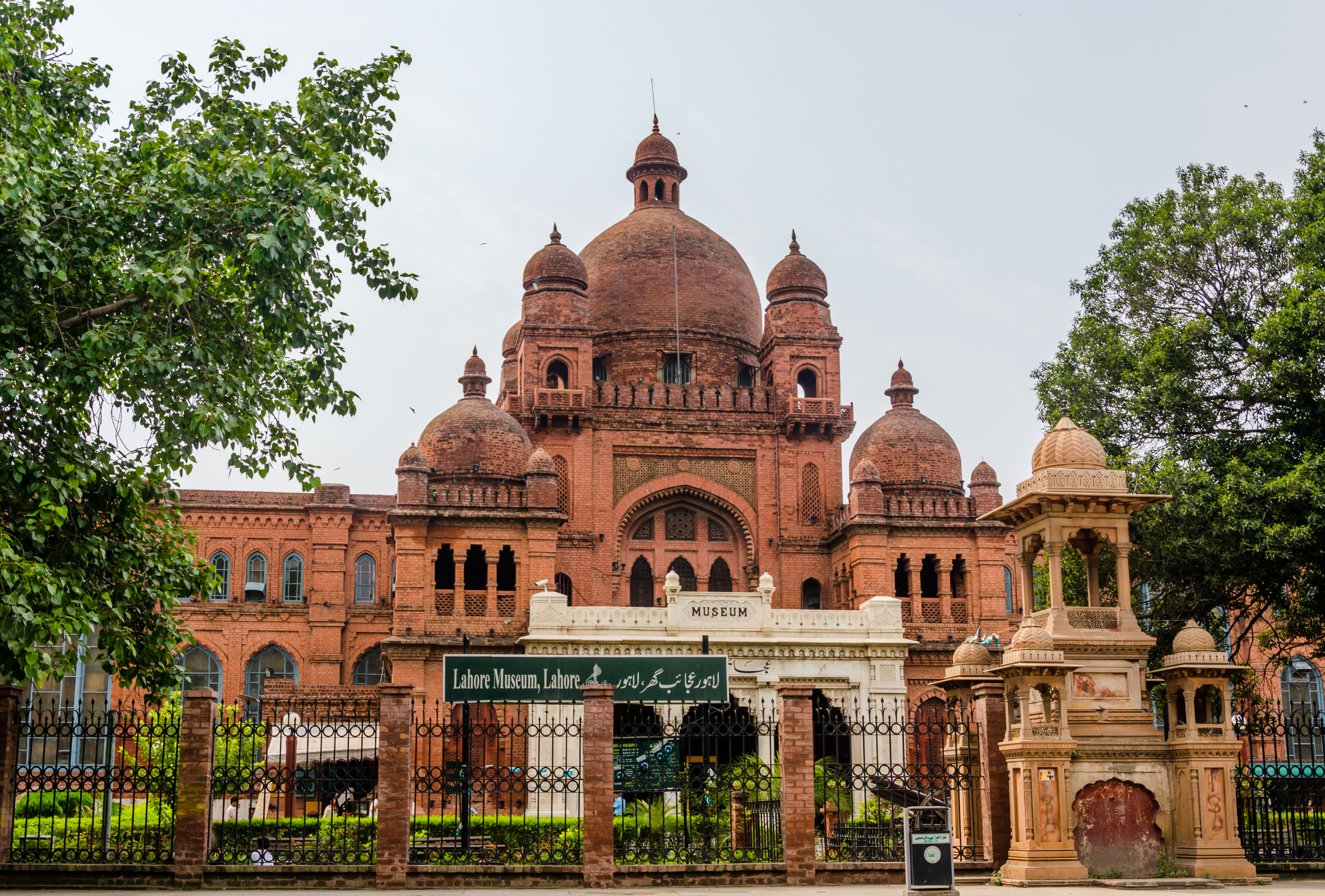
Lahore Museum

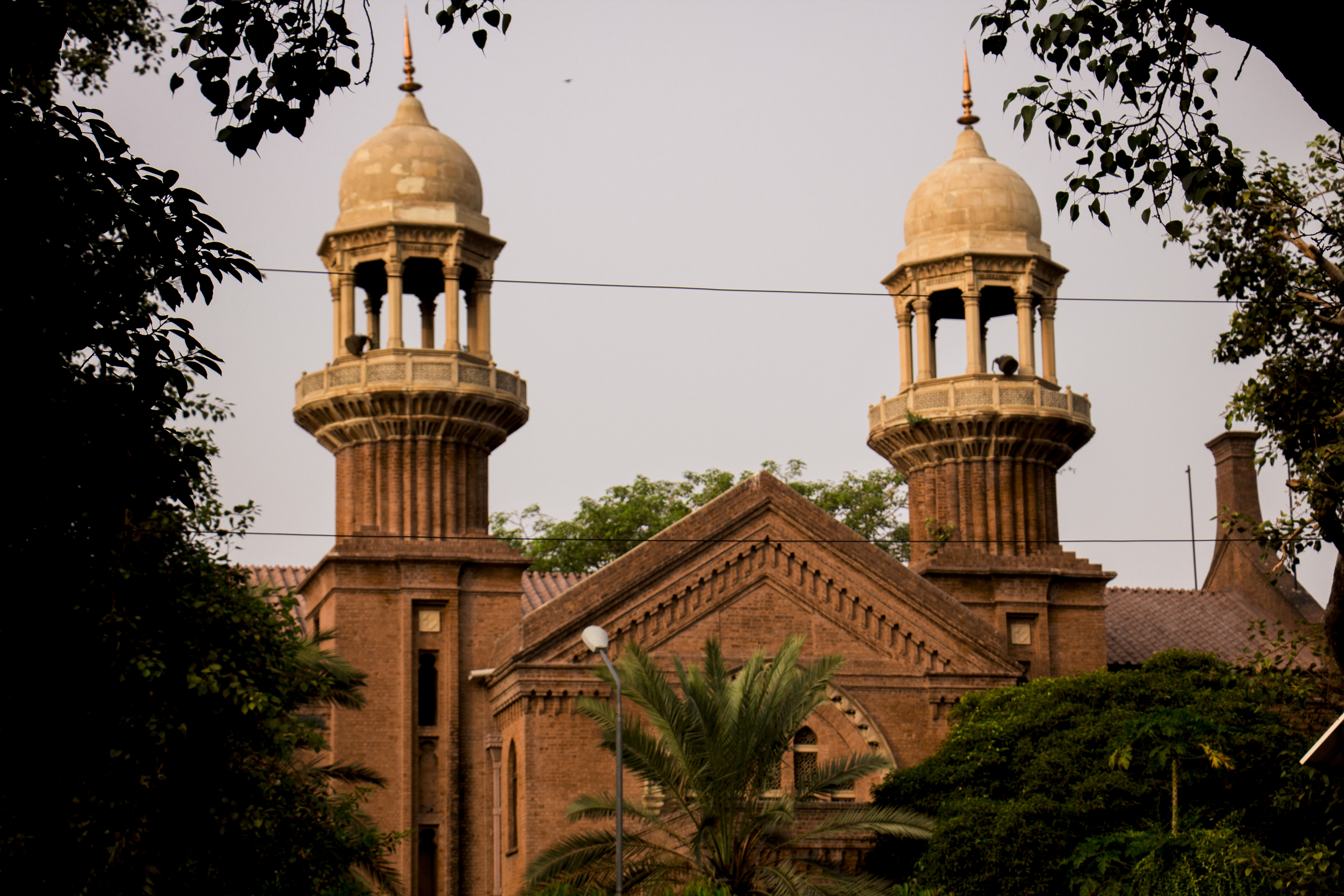
Lahore High Court

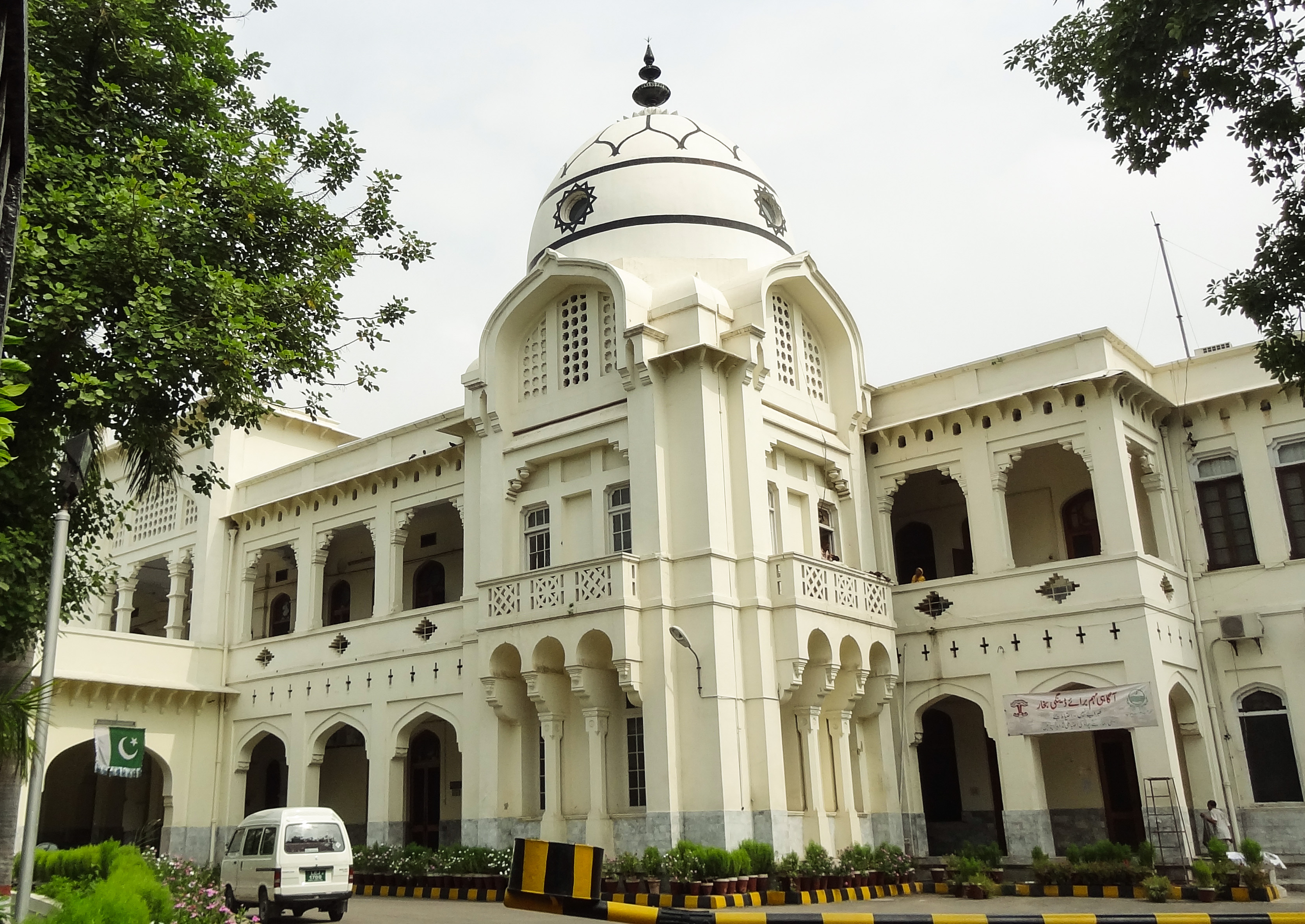
King Edward Medical University

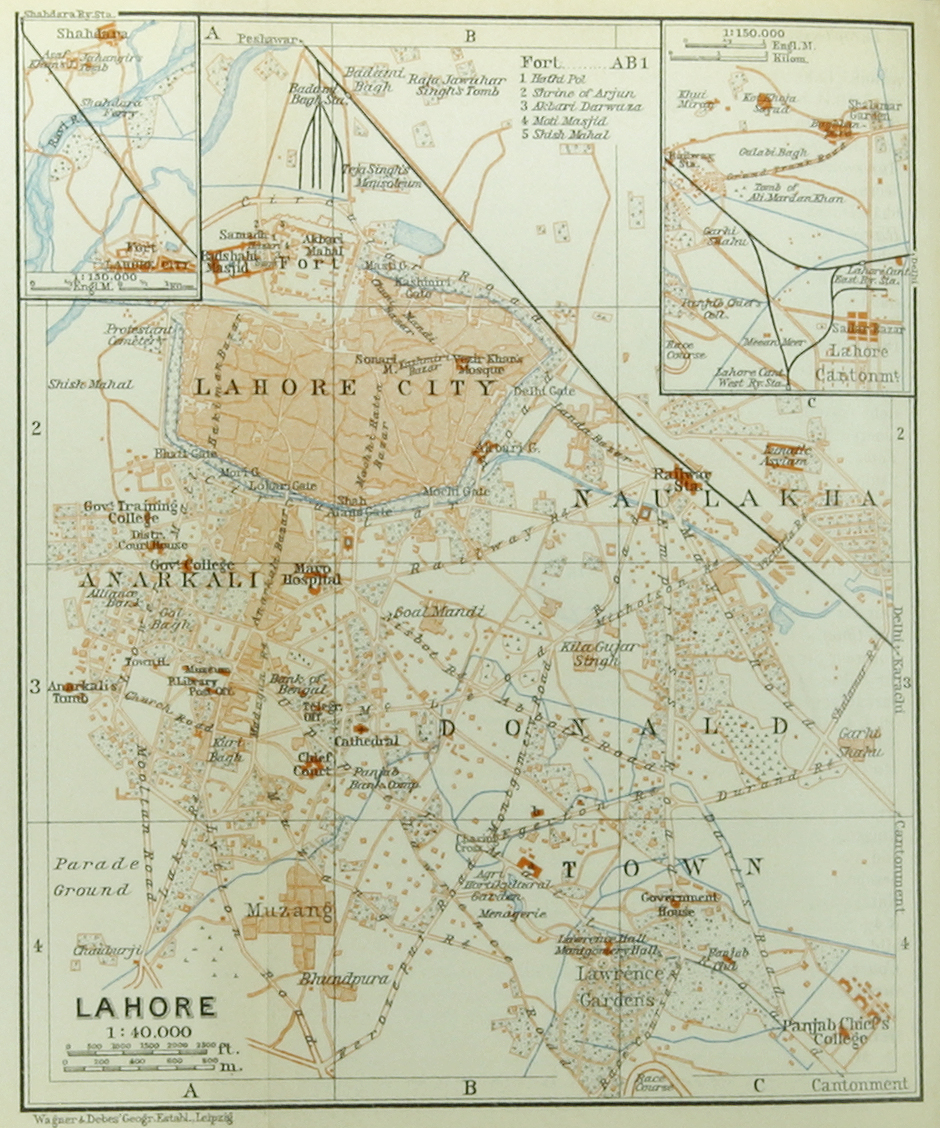
Map of the Old City and environs.

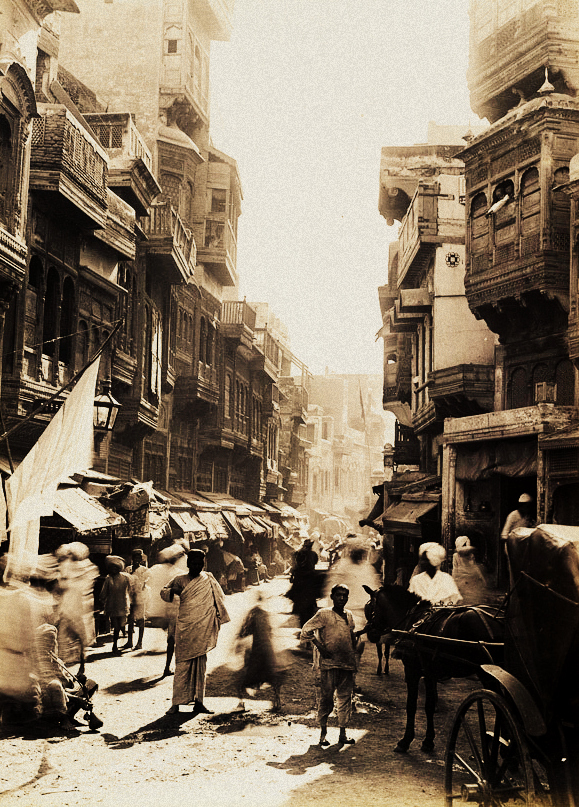
The Shah Alami area of Lahore's Walled City in 1890

The British East India Company seized control of Lahore in February 1846 from the collapsing Sikh state and occupied the rest of Punjab in 1848. Following the defeat of the Sikhs at the Battle of Gujrat, British troops formally deposed Maharaja Duleep Singh in Lahore that same year. Punjab was then annexed to the British Indian Empire in 1849.

At the commencement of British rule, Lahore was estimated to have a population of 120,000. Prior to annexation by the British, Lahore's environs consisted mostly of the Walled City surrounded by plains interrupted by settlements to the south and east, such as Mozang and Qila Gujar Singh, which have since been engulfed by modern Lahore. The plains between the settlements also contained the remains of Mughal gardens, tombs, and Sikh-era military structures.

The British viewed Lahore's Walled City as a bed of potential social discontent and disease epidemics, and so largely left the inner city alone, while focusing development efforts in Lahore's suburban areas and Punjab's fertile countryside. The British instead laid out their capital city in an area south of the Walled City that would first come to be known as "Donald's Town" before being renamed "Civil Station".

Under early British rule, formerly prominent Mughal-era monuments that were scattered throughout Civil Station were also re-purposed and sometimes desecrated – including the Tomb of Anarkali, which the British had initially converted to clerical offices before re-purposing it as an Anglican church in 1851. The 17th-century Dai Anga Mosque was converted into railway administration offices during this time, the tomb of Nawab Bahadur Khan was converted into a storehouse, and the tomb of Mir Mannu was used as a wine shop. The British also used older structures to house municipal offices, such as the Civil Secretariat, Public Works Department, and Accountant General's Office.

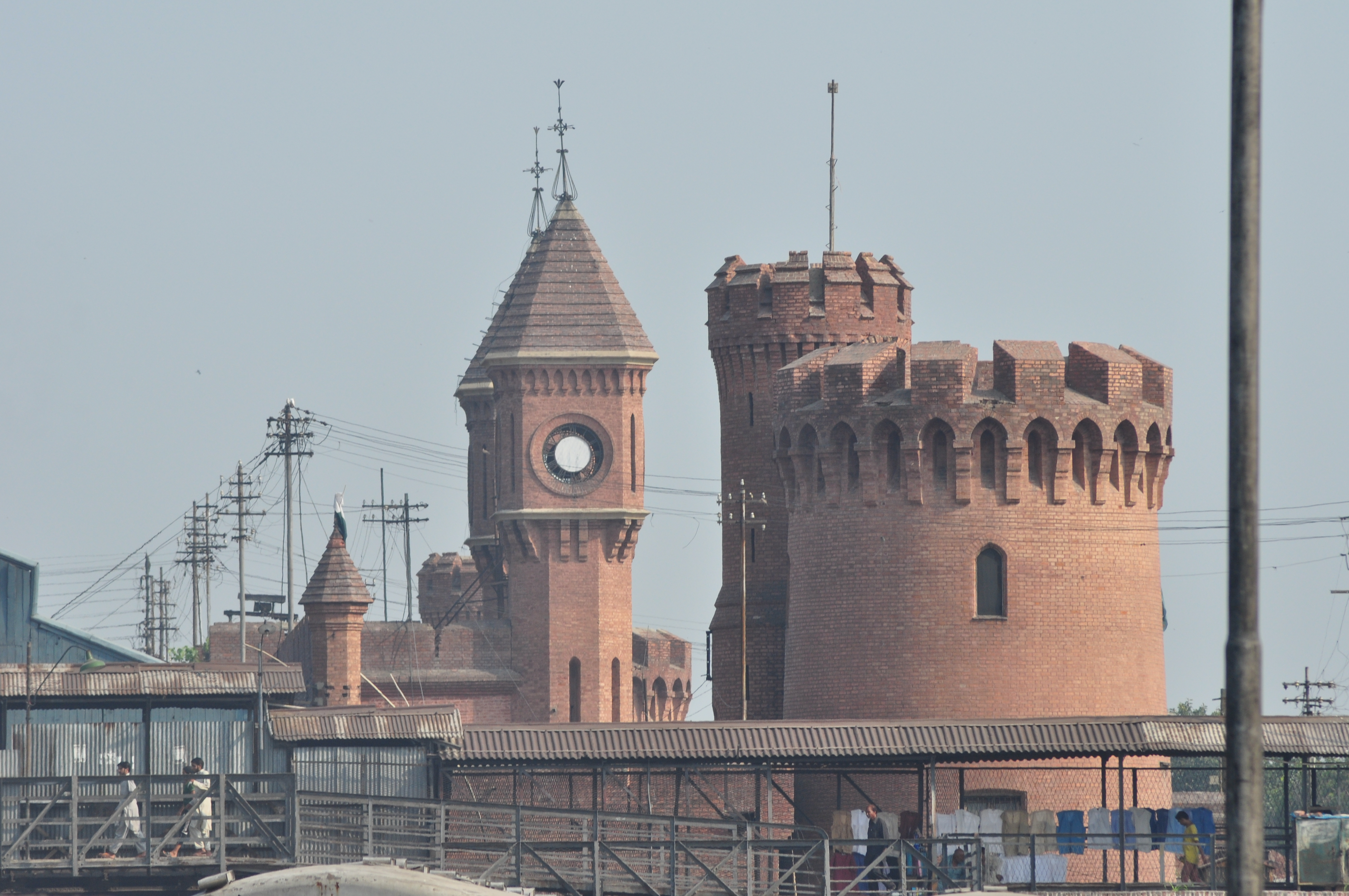
Constructed in the aftermath of the 1857 Sepoy Mutiny, the design of the Lahore Railway Station was highly militarised to defend the structure from further uprisings against British rule.

The British built the Lahore Railway Station just outside the Walled City shortly after the Sepoy Mutiny of 1857; the station was therefore styled as a mediaeval castle to ward off any potential future uprisings, with thick walls, turrets, and holes to direct gun and cannon fire for the defence of the structure. Lahore's most prominent government institutions and commercial enterprises came to be concentrated in Civil Station in a half-mile wide area flanking The Mall, where unlike in Lahore's military zone, the British and locals were allowed to mix. The Mall continues to serve as the epicentre of Lahore's civil administration, as well as one of its most fashionable commercial areas. The British also laid the spacious Lahore Cantonment to the southeast of the Walled City at the former village of Mian Mir, where unlike around The Mall, laws did exist against the mixing of different races.

Lahore was visited on 9 February 1870 by Prince Alfred, Duke of Edinburgh – a visit in which he received delegations from the Dogras of Jammu, Maharajas of Patiala, the Nawab of Bahawalpur, and other rulers from various Punjabi states. During the visit, he visited several of Lahore's major sights. British authorities built several important structures around the time of the Golden Jubilee of Queen Victoria (1887) in the distinctive Indo-Saracenic style, including the Lahore Museum and Mayo School of Industrial Arts.

The British carried out a census of Lahore in 1901, and counted 20,691 houses in the Walled City. An estimated 200,000 people lived in Lahore at this time. Lahore's posh Model Town was established as a "garden town" suburb in 1921, while Krishan Nagar locality was laid in the 1930s near The Mall and Walled City.

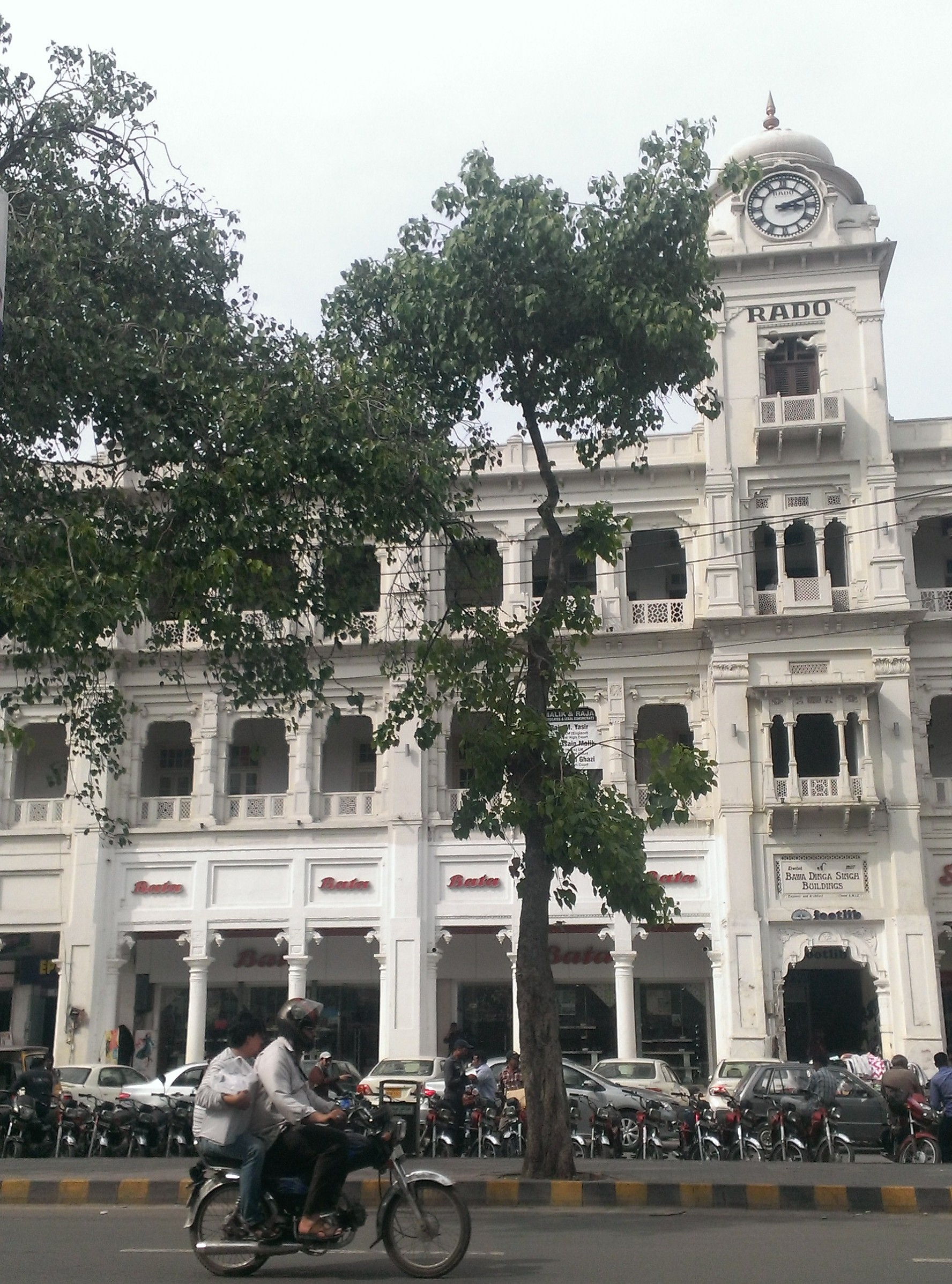
The Mall, Lahore's pre-independence commercial core, features many examples of colonial architecture.

Lahore played an important role in the independence movements of both India and Pakistan. The Declaration of the Independence of India was moved by Jawaharlal Nehru and passed unanimously at midnight on 31 December 1929 at Lahore's Bradlaugh Hall. The Indian Swaraj flag was adopted this time as well. Lahore's jail was used by the British to imprison independence activists such as Jatin Das, and was also where Bhagat Singh was hanged in 1931. Under the leadership of Muhammad Ali Jinnah, the All India Muslim League passed the Lahore Resolution in 1940, demanding the creation of Pakistan as a separate homeland for the Muslims of India.

=== Partition ===
The future of the city of Lahore was fiercely contested during partition. According to the 1941 census, the city of Lahore had a population of 671,659, of which was 64.5% Muslim, with the remainder 35% being Hindu and Sikh, alongside a small Christian community. This population figure was disputed by Hindus and Sikhs before the Boundary Commission that would draw the Radcliffe Line to demarcate the border of the two new states based on religious demography, who argued that the city was only 54% Muslim based on 1945 ration card figures, and that Hindu and Sikh domination of the city's economy and educational institutions should trump Muslim demography. Two-thirds of shops, and 80% of Lahore's factories belonged to the Hindu and Sikh community. Indian journalist Kuldip Nayar claimed that Cyril Radcliffe had told him in 1971 that he originally had planned to give Lahore to the new Dominion of India, but decided to place it within the Dominion of Pakistan, which he saw as lacking a major city as he had already awarded Calcutta to India.

As tensions grew over the city's uncertain fate, Lahore experienced Partition's worst riots. Carnage ensued in which all three religious groups were both victims and perpetrators. Early riots in March and April 1947 destroyed 6,000 of Lahore's 82,000 homes. Violence continued to rise throughout the summer, despite the presence of armoured British personnel. Hindus and Sikhs began to leave the city en masse as their hopes that the Boundary Commission would award the city to India came to be regarded as increasingly unlikely. By late August 1947, 66% of Hindus and Sikhs had left the city. The Shah Alami Bazaar, once a largely Hindu quarter of the Walled City, was entirely burnt down during subsequent rioting.

When Pakistan's independence was declared on 14 August 1947, the Radcliffe Line had not yet been announced, and so cries of "Long live Pakistan" and "God is greatest" were heard intermittently with "Long live Hindustan" throughout the night. On 17 August 1947, Lahore was awarded to Pakistan on the basis of its Muslim majority in the 1941 census and was made capital of the Punjab province in the new state of Pakistan. The city's location near the Indian border meant that it received large numbers of refugees fleeing eastern Punjab and northern India, though it was able to accommodate them given the large stock of abandoned Hindu and Sikh properties that could be re-distributed to newly arrived refugees. In post-partition India, the loss of Lahore catalyzed the development of the new modernist capital city of Chandigarh.

=== Modern ===
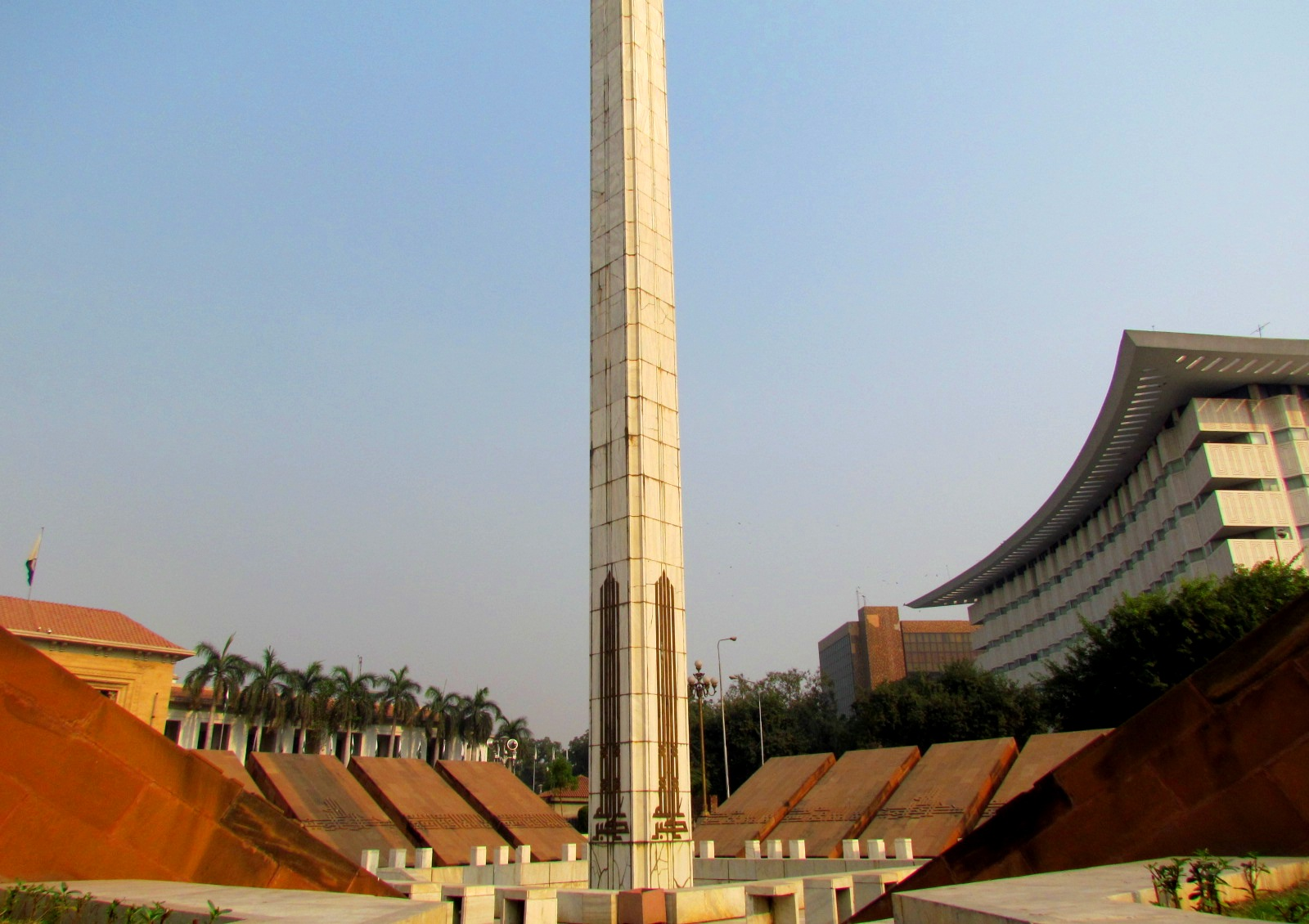
Islamic Summit Minar

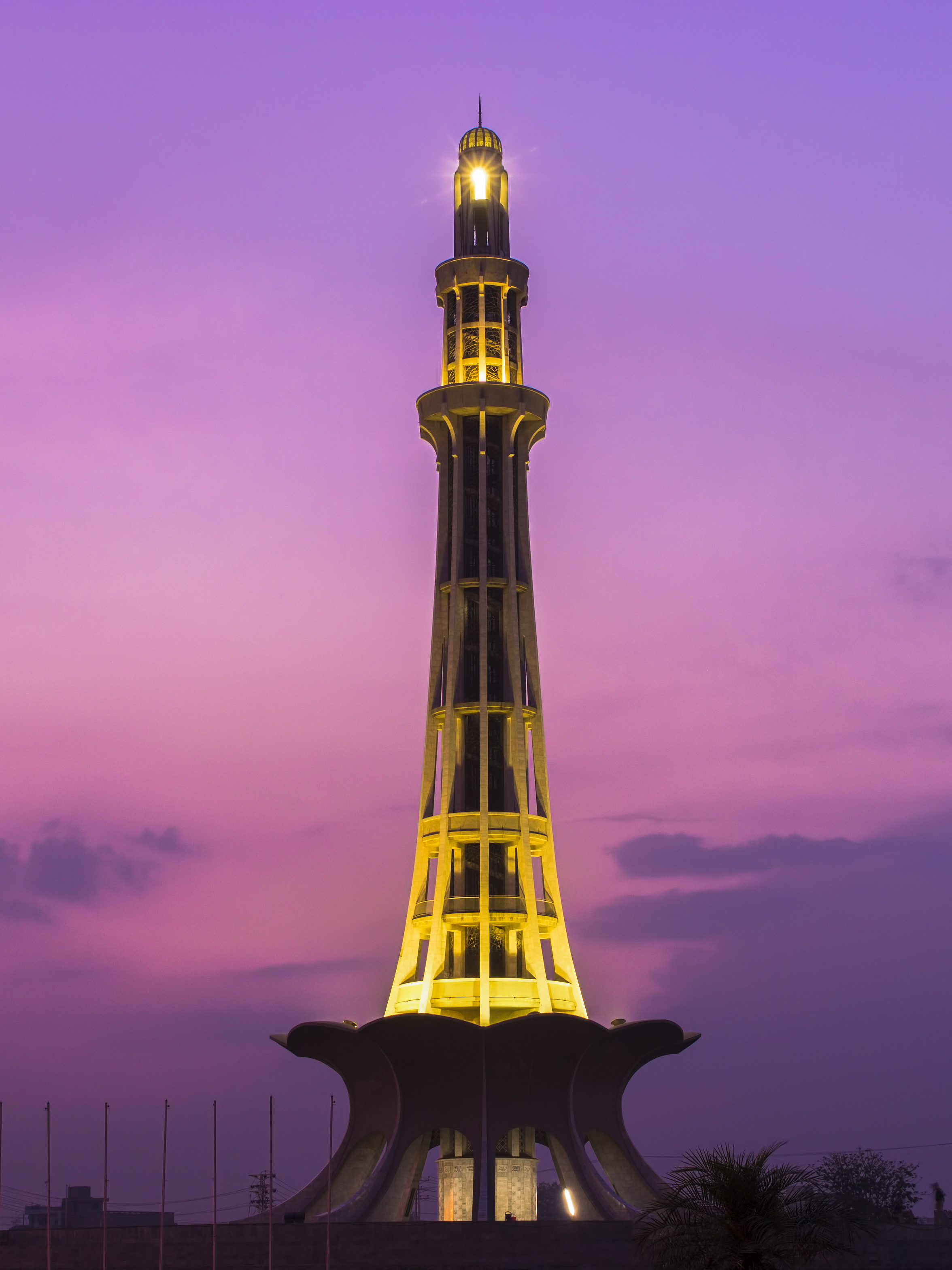
Minar-e-Pakistan

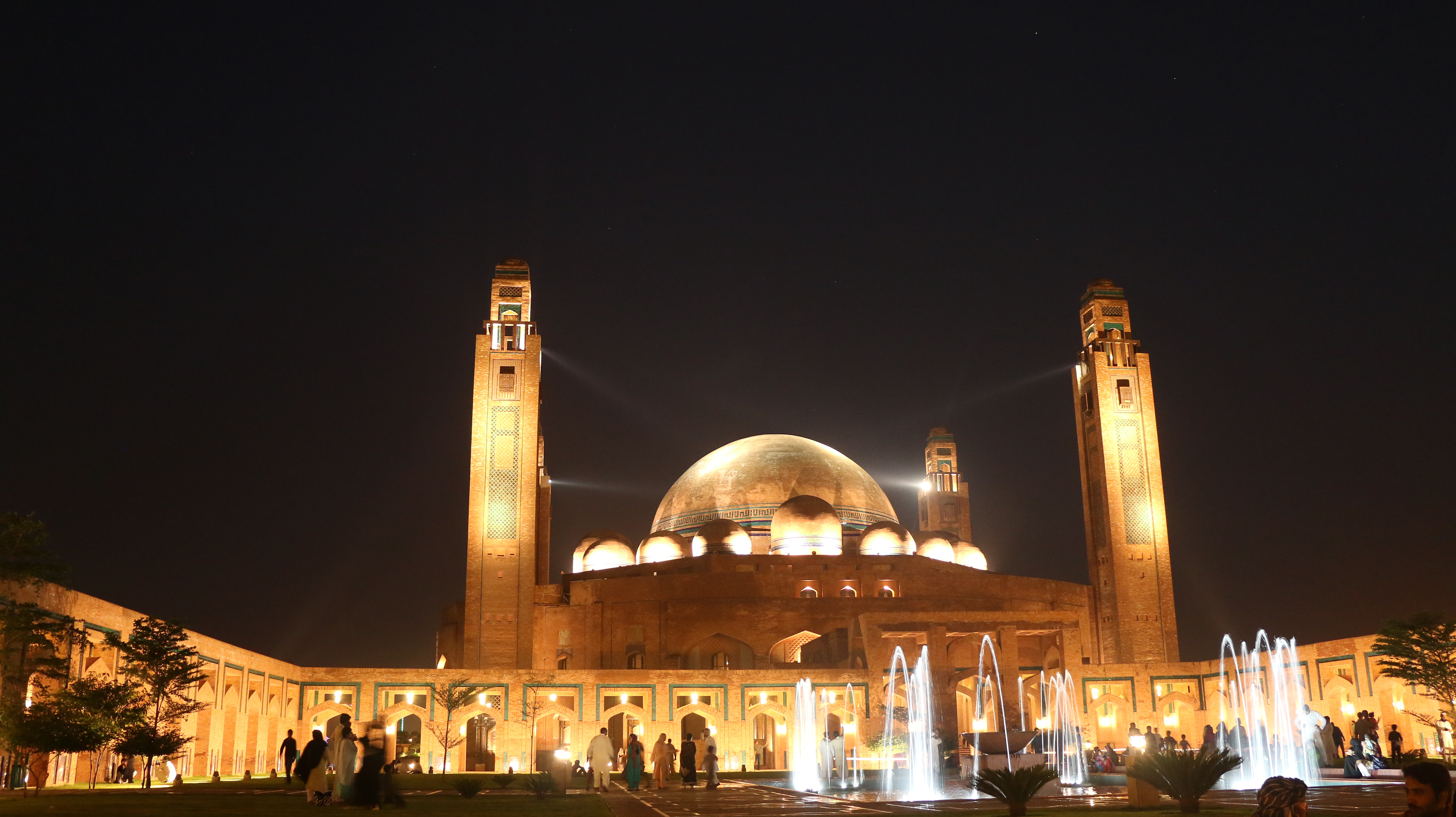
Grand Jamia Mosque

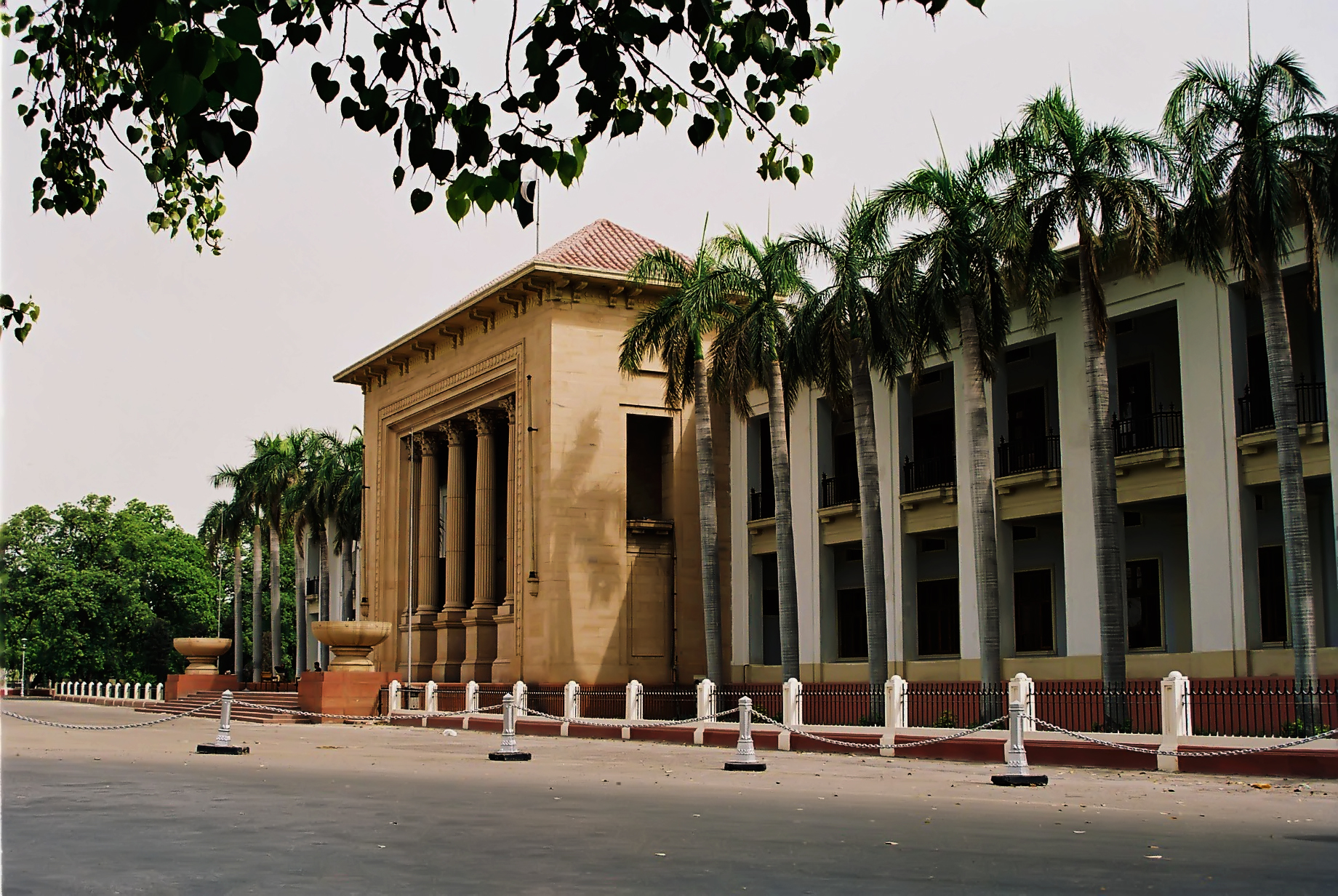
Provincial Assembly of the Punjab

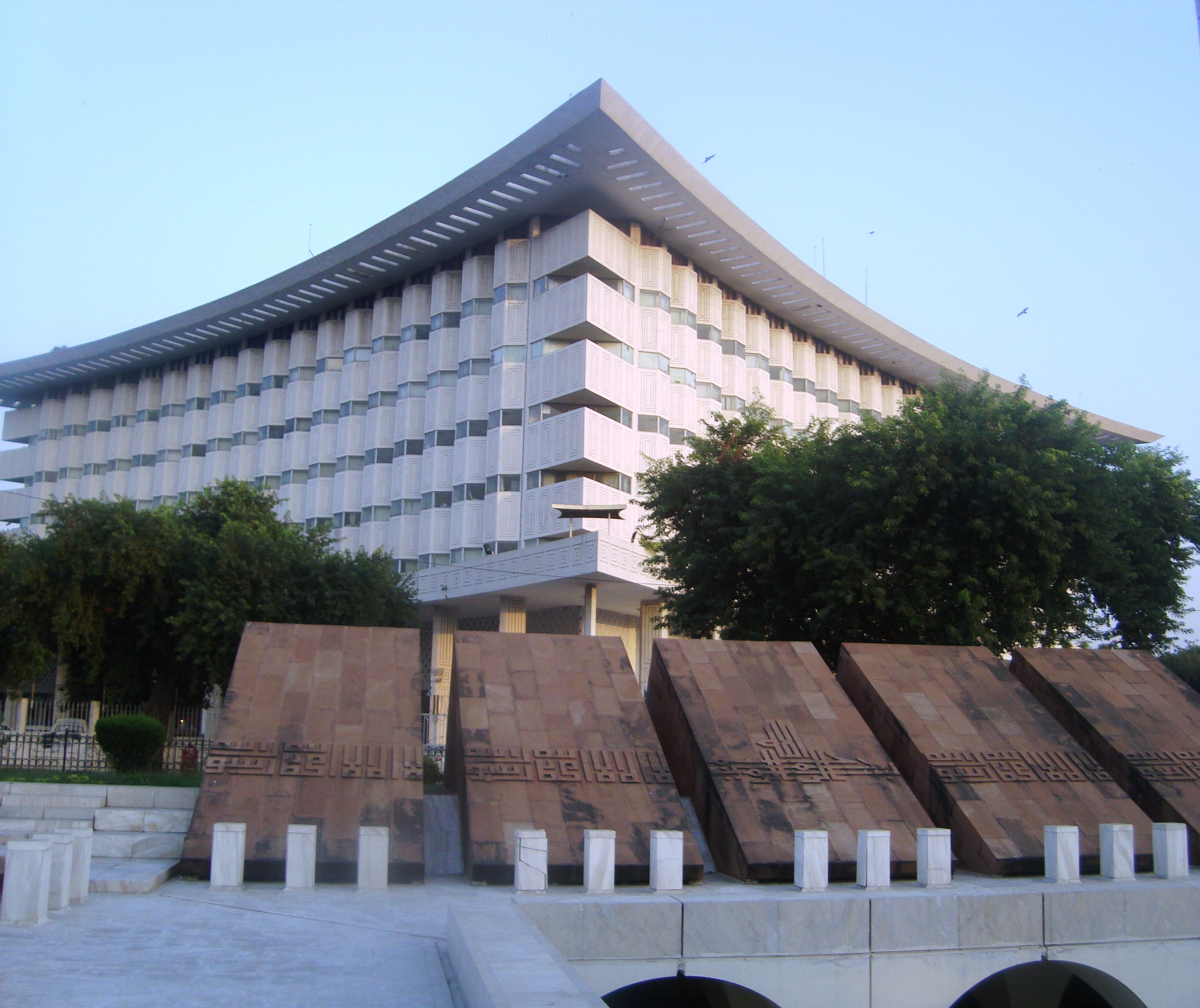
WAPDA House

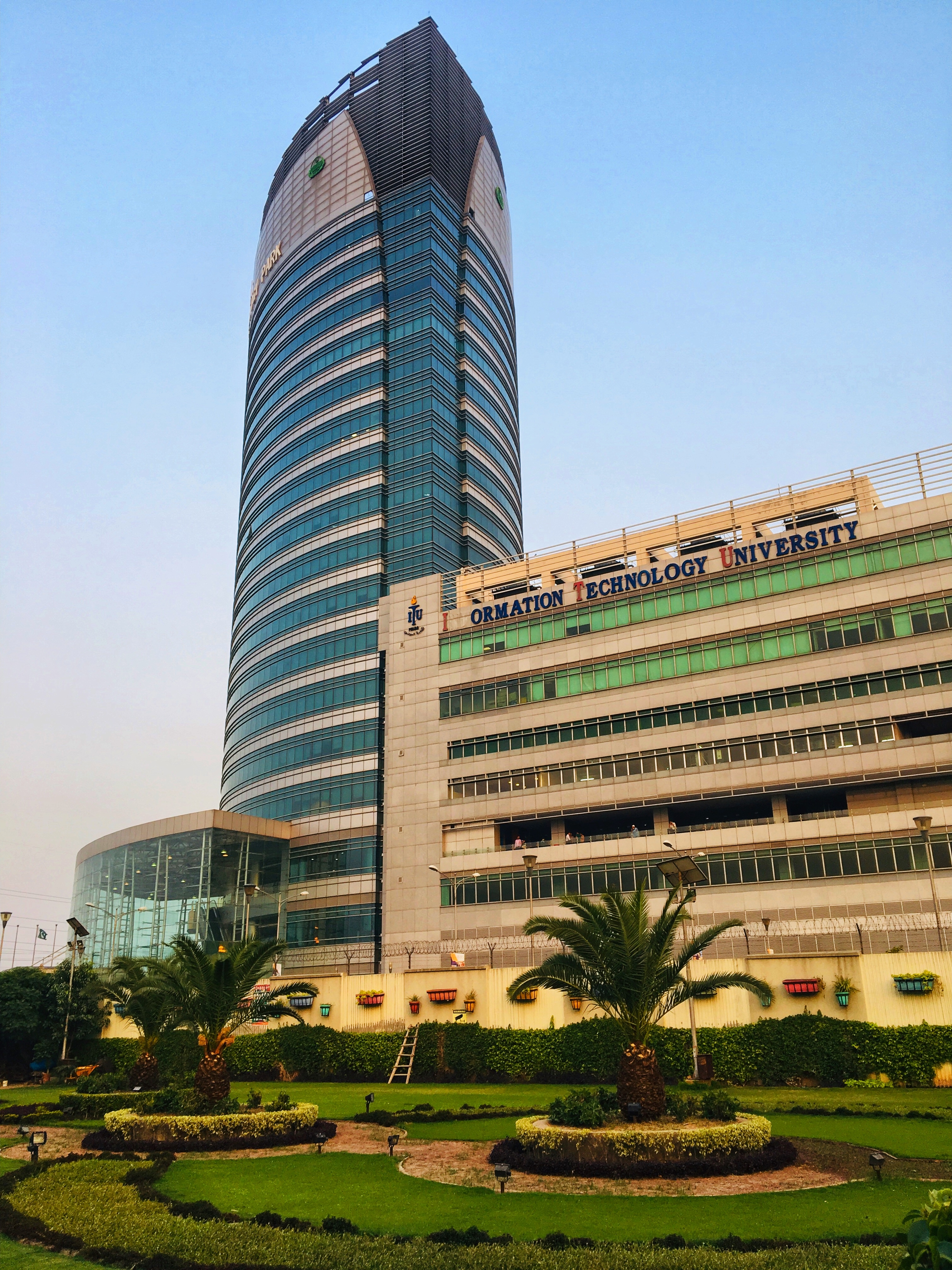
Arfa Karim tower in Lahore

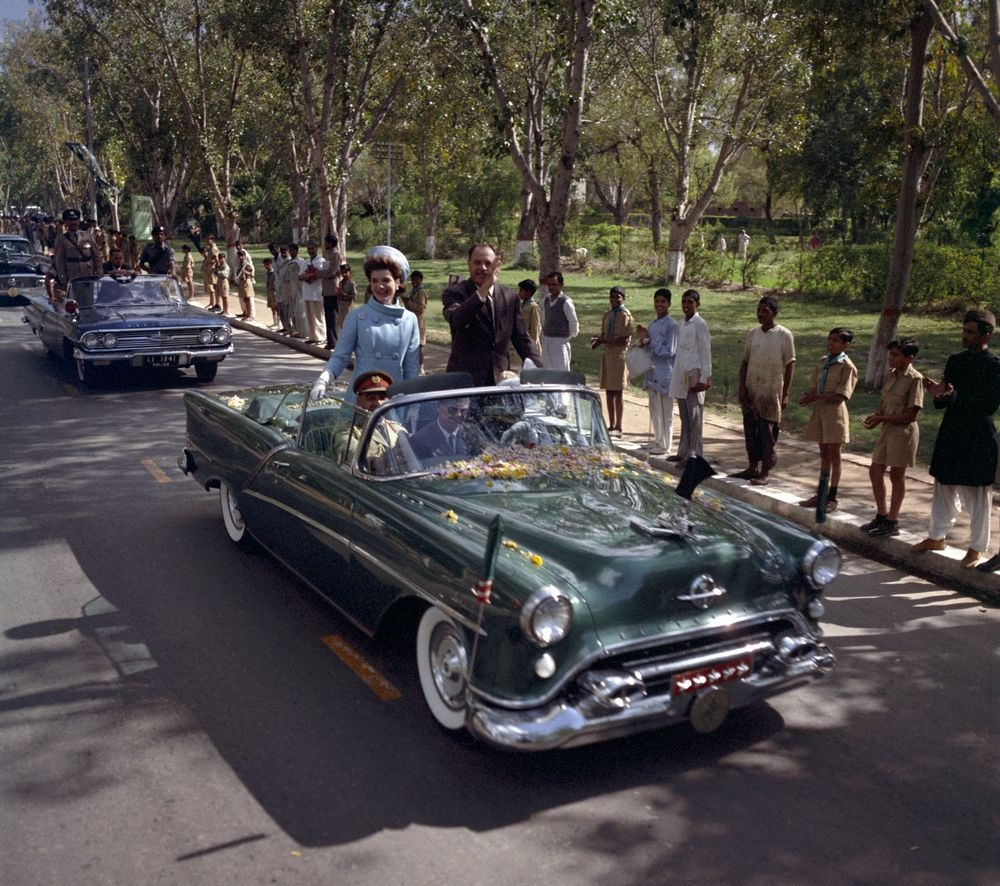
First Lady Jacqueline Kennedy and President Ayub Khan travelled by car in Lahore, 1962

Partition left Lahore with a much-weakened economy, and a stymied social and cultural scene that had previously been invigorated by the city's Hindus and Sikhs. Industrial production dropped to one-third of pre-Partition level by the end of the 1940s, and only 27% of its manufacturing units were operating by 1950, and usually well-below capacity. Capital flight further weakened the city's economy while Karachi industrialised and became more prosperous. The city's weakened economy, and proximity to the Indian border, meant that the city was deemed unsuitable to be the Pakistani capital after independence. Karachi was therefore chosen to be the capital on account of its relative tranquility during the Partition period, stronger economy, and better infrastructure.

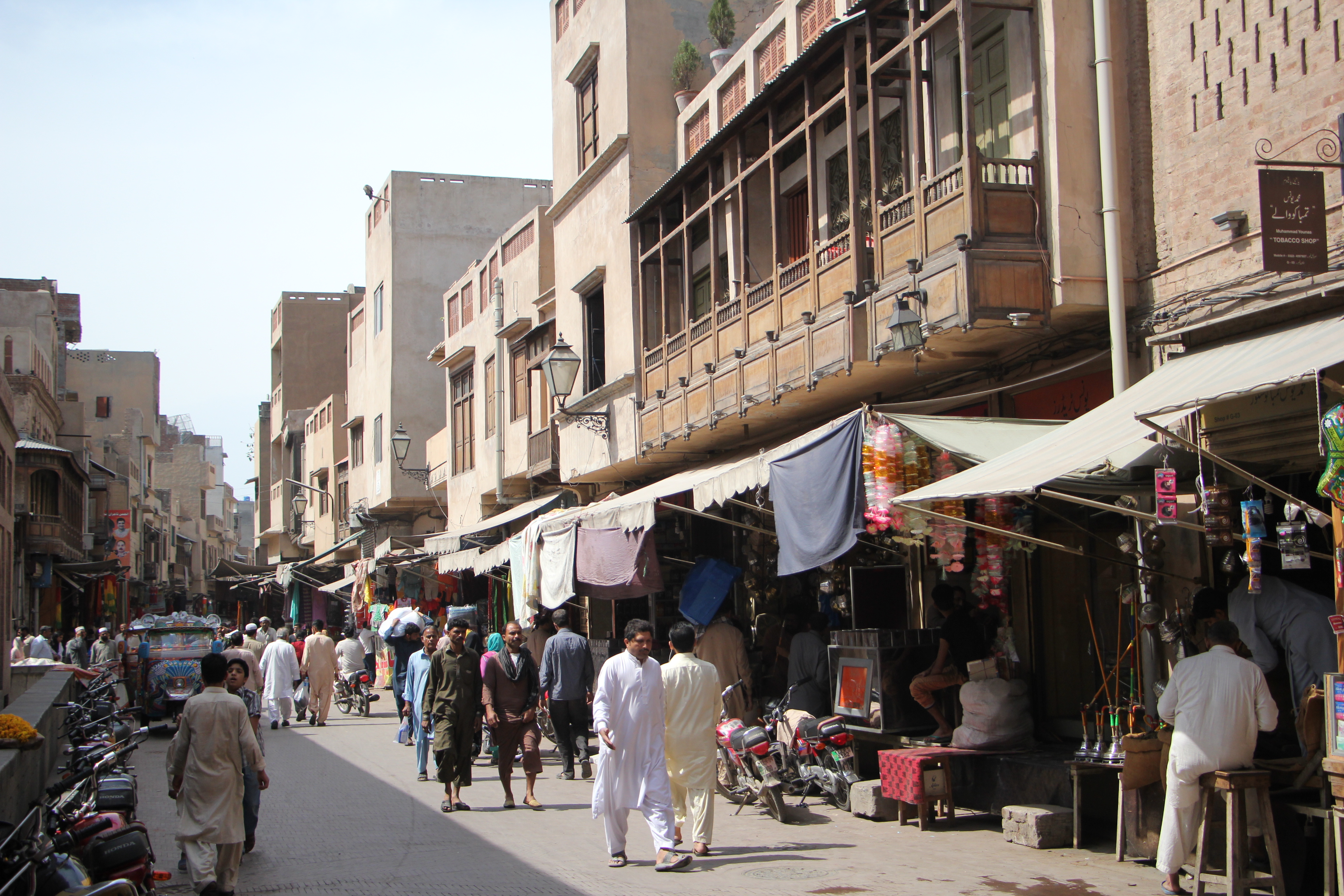
Sections of the Walled City of Lahore have been under restoration since 2012 in conjunction with the Agha Khan Trust for Culture.

After independence, Lahore slowly regained its significance as an economic and cultural centre of western Punjab. Reconstruction began in 1949 of the Shah Alami Bazaar, the former Hindu-dominated commercial heart of the Walled City prior to its destruction in the 1947 riots. The Tomb of Allama Iqbal was built in 1951 to honour the philosopher-poet who provided the spiritual inspiration for the Pakistan movement. In 1955, Lahore was selected to be the capital of all West Pakistan during the single-unit period that lasted until 1970. Shortly afterwards, Lahore's iconic Minar-e-Pakistan was completed in 1968 to mark the spot where the Pakistan Resolution was passed. With support from the United Nations, the government was able to rebuild Lahore, and most scars from the communal violence of Partition were ameliorated.

The second Islamic Summit Conference was held in the city in 1974. In retaliation for the destruction of the Babri Masjid in India, riots erupted in 1992 in which several non-Muslim monuments were targeted, including the tomb of Maharaja Sher Singh, and the former Jain temple near The Mall. In 1996, the International Cricket Council Cricket World Cup final match was held at the Gaddafi Stadium in Lahore.

The Walled City of Lahore restoration project began in 2009, when the Punjab government restored the Royal Trail from Akbari Gate to the Lahore Fort with money from the World Bank.

== Geography ==
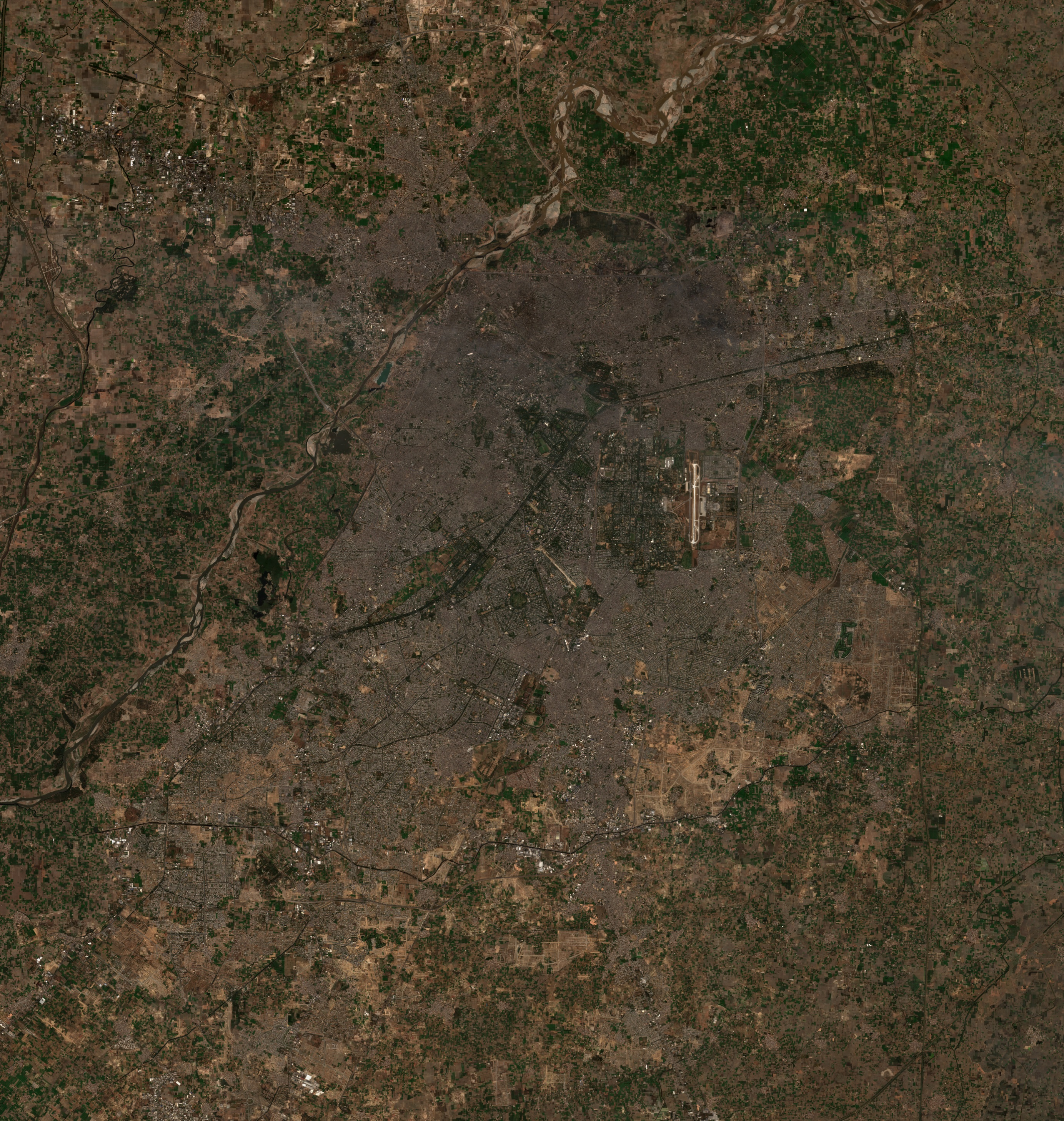
Lahore as seen from International Space Station. The Ravi River flows from north to west. The city is rapidly growing towards the south.

Lahore is in northeastern portion of Pakistan, lying between 31°15′—31°45′ N and 74°01′—74°39′ E. The city is bounded on the north and west by the Sheikhupura District, on the east by Wagah, and on the south by Kasur District. The Ravi River flows on the northern side of Lahore. Lahore city covers a total land area of 404 square kilometres (156 sq mi).

=== Climate ===
Lahore

Climate chart (precipitation, max. and min. temperature)
J	F	M	A	M	J	J	A	S	O	N	D
23 20 6	29 22 9	41 27 14	20 34 20	22 39 24	36 40 27	202 36 27	164 35 26	61 35 24	12 33 18	4.2 27 12	14 22 7
- █ Average max. and min. temperatures in °C
- █ Precipitation totals in mm
- Source: NOAA
Imperial conversion
J	F	M	A	M	J	J	A	S	O	N	D
0.9 68 43	1.1 72 48	1.6 81 57	0.8 93 67	0.9 101 75	1.4 105 81	8 97 80	6.5 95 80	2.4 95 76	0.5 91 65	0.2 81 53	0.5 71 44
- █ Average max. and min. temperatures in °F
- █ Precipitation totals in inches

Lahore has a hot semi-arid climate (Köppen climate classification BSh), bordering on a humid subtropical climate. The hottest month is June, where temperatures routinely exceed 45 °C (113 °F). The monsoon season starts in late June, and the wettest months are July, August and September. with heavy rainfalls and evening thunderstorms with the possibility of cloudbursts and flash floods. The coolest month is January, with dense fog.

The city's record high temperature was 50.4 °C (122.7 °F), recorded on 5 June 2003. On 10 June 2007, a temperature of 48 °C (118 °F) was recorded; this was in the shade, and the meteorological office recording the figure reported a heat index in direct sunlight of 55 °C (131 °F). The highest rainfall in a 24-hour period is 337 millimetres (13.3 in), recorded on 1 August 2024.

Climate data for Lahore (1991–2020 normals, extremes 1931–present)
Month	Jan	Feb	Mar	Apr	May	Jun	Jul	Aug	Sep	Oct	Nov	Dec	Year
Record high °C (°F)	27.8 (82.0)	33.3 (91.9)	37.8 (100.0)	46.1 (115.0)	48.3 (118.9)	47.2 (117.0)	46.1 (115.0)	42.8 (109.0)	41.7 (107.1)	40.6 (105.1)	35.0 (95.0)	30.0 (86.0)	48.3 (118.9)
Mean daily maximum °C (°F)	18.4 (65.1)	22.2 (72.0)	27.5 (81.5)	34.2 (93.6)	38.9 (102.0)	38.9 (102.0)	35.6 (96.1)	34.7 (94.5)	34.4 (93.9)	32.4 (90.3)	27.1 (80.8)	21.4 (70.5)	30.5 (86.9)
Daily mean °C (°F)	13.1 (55.6)	16.5 (61.7)	21.6 (70.9)	27.7 (81.9)	32.3 (90.1)	33.2 (91.8)	31.3 (88.3)	30.8 (87.4)	29.9 (85.8)	26.3 (79.3)	20.4 (68.7)	15.1 (59.2)	24.9 (76.7)
Mean daily minimum °C (°F)	7.6 (45.7)	10.8 (51.4)	15.7 (60.3)	21.1 (70.0)	25.6 (78.1)	27.4 (81.3)	27.1 (80.8)	26.9 (80.4)	25.3 (77.5)	20.1 (68.2)	13.7 (56.7)	8.8 (47.8)	19.2 (66.5)
Record low °C (°F)	−2.2 (28.0)	0.0 (32.0)	2.8 (37.0)	10.0 (50.0)	14.0 (57.2)	17.8 (64.0)	20.0 (68.0)	19.0 (66.2)	16.7 (62.1)	8.3 (46.9)	1.0 (33.8)	−1.1 (30.0)	−2.2 (28.0)
Average precipitation mm (inches)	21.9 (0.86)	31.5 (1.24)	31.5 (1.24)	19.5 (0.77)	17.7 (0.70)	73.8 (2.91)	188.6 (7.43)	177.1 (6.97)	88.6 (3.49)	10.3 (0.41)	6.9 (0.27)	6.8 (0.27)	674.2 (26.56)
Average precipitation days (≥ 1.0 mm)	2.5	3.5	3.6	2.8	2.9	5.0	9.1	8.7	4.9	1.1	1.9	1.1	47.1
Average relative humidity (%)	66	58	53	42	36	42	66	70	63	58	53	67	56
Mean monthly sunshine hours	218.8	215.0	245.8	256.1	308.3	269.0	227.5	234.9	265.6	290.0	229.6	222.9	2,983.5
Mean daily sunshine hours	7.1	7.6	7.9	9.2	9.9	9.0	7.3	7.6	8.9	9.4	8.7	7.2	8.3
Source 1: NOAA (sun 1961–1990), Deutscher Wetterdienst (humidity 1951–1990, daily sun 1961–1990)
Source 2: PMD

According to the World Air Quality Report 2024, Lahore is one of the world's most polluted cities.

== Demographics ==
Historical population

Year	Pop.	±%
1881	138,878	—
1891	159,947	+15.2%
1901	186,884	+16.8%
1911	228,687	+22.4%
1921	281,781	+23.2%
1931	400,075	+42.0%
1941	671,659	+67.9%

Year	Pop.	±%
1951	1,130,000	+68.2%
1961	1,630,000	+44.2%
1972	2,198,890	+34.9%
1981	2,988,486	+35.9%
1998	5,209,088	+74.3%
2017	11,126,285	+113.6%
2023	13,004,135	+16.9%

Source: ""

=== Population ===
The results of the 2017 Census determined the population of Lahore to be 11,126,285, with an annual growth rate of 4.07% since 1998. Gender-wise, 52.35% of the population are male, 47.64% are female, and 0.01% are transgender. Lahore is a demographically young city, with over 40% of its inhabitants below the age of 15.

=== Tribes and background ===
At the time of the 2017 Pakistani census, the largest tribal group were Arain Punjabis, constituting 40%, followed by Punjabi–Kashmiris at 30% with other tribes such as Rajput Punjabis and Kamboh Punjabis at 5% each. The majority of the rest 20% is constituted by other Punjabi tribes, with a minority constituted by other ethnic communities such as Muhajirs, Pashtuns and Meo.

Tribes and backgrounds in the Lahore district
1. Arains (40.0%)
2. Kashmiris (30.0%)
3. Rajputs (5.00%)
4. Kamboj (5.00%)
5. Others (20.0%)

==== Controversy about the city's Pashtun population ====
Some Pashtun nationalist parties argue that the Pashtun population of Lahore in the 2017 census has been underestimated, with Ameer Bahadur Khan, provincial general secretary of Awami National Party, putting their numbers at 1.5 million, while Gul Muhammad Regwal, a member of Pakhtunkhwa Milli Awami Party, claiming more than 1 million including 300,000 in the Walled City alone, most of these having moved over the last 20 years, including due to military operations, but remaining uncounted as they're not considered permanent residents of Lahore.

=== Religion ===
Religion in Lahore District 2023
Religion	Percent
Islam	95.26%
Christianity	4.64%
Others	0.1%

According to the 2023 Census, the vast majority of Lahore's population are Muslims (95.26%), up from 94.7% in 2017. Other religions include Christians (4.64%, slightly less than 5.14% in 2017) and small numbers of Ahmadis, Baháʼís, Hindus, Parsis, and Sikhs. There is also a small but longstanding Zoroastrian community.

Since Lahore contains some of Sikhism's holiest sites, it is a major pilgrimage destination for Sikhs. Lahore's first church was built during the reign of Emperor Akbar in the late 16th century, but was then levelled by Shah Jahan in 1632. Due to the few numbers of Hindus living in Lahore, the only two functional Hindu temples in the city are the Shri Krishna Mandir and the Valmiki Mandir.

Religious groups in Lahore City (1868−2023) (Note: 1881–1951: Data for the entirety of the town of Lahore, which included Lahore Municipality and Lahore Cantonment.)
Religious group	1868 (Note: Also includes the suburban urban areas/villages of Mian Mir, Muzang, and Ichra, which ultimately became part of the town of Lahore.)		1881		1891		1901		1911		1921		1931		1941		1951		2017		2023	
Religious group	Pop.	%	Pop.	%	Pop.	%	Pop.	%	Pop.	%	Pop.	%	Pop.	%	Pop.	%	Pop.	%	Pop.	%	Pop.	%
Islam	70,974	56.18%	86,413	57.85%	102,280	57.83%	119,601	58.93%	129,801	56.76%	149,044	52.89%	249,315	58.01%	433,170	64.49%	817,236	96.22%	10,530,816	94.7%	12,363,149	95.26%
Hinduism (Note: 1931–1941: Including Ad-Dharmis)	40,551	32.1%	53,641	35.91%	62,077	35.1%	70,196	34.59%	77,267	33.79%	107,783	38.25%	139,125	32.37%	179,422	26.71%	1,760	0.21%	2,670	0.02%	2,811	0.02%
Sikhism	3,520	2.79%	4,627	3.1%	7,306	4.13%	7,023	3.46%	12,877	5.63%	12,833	4.55%	23,477	5.46%	34,021	5.07%	—N/a	—N/a	—N/a	—N/a	715	0.01%
Christianity	—N/a	—N/a	529 (Note: Only includes protestant population.)	0.35%	4,697	2.66%	5,558	2.74%	8,436	3.69%	11,287	4.01%	16,875	3.93%	21,495	3.2%	—N/a	—N/a	571,365	5.14%	602,431	4.64%
Jainism	—N/a	—N/a	227	0.15%	339	0.19%	420	0.21%	467	0.2%	474	0.17%	791	0.18%	1,094	0.16%	—N/a	—N/a	—N/a	—N/a	—N/a	—N/a
Zoroastrianism	—N/a	—N/a	—N/a	—N/a	132	0.07%	166	0.08%	198	0.09%	177	0.06%	150	0.03%	—N/a	—N/a	—N/a	—N/a	—N/a	—N/a	77	0%
Judaism	—N/a	—N/a	—N/a	—N/a	14	0.01%	—N/a	—N/a	13	0.01%	13	0%	0	0%	—N/a	—N/a	—N/a	—N/a	—N/a	—N/a	—N/a	—N/a
Buddhism	—N/a	—N/a	—N/a	—N/a	0	0%	0	0%	128	0.06%	170	0.06%	14	0%	—N/a	—N/a	—N/a	—N/a	—N/a	—N/a	—N/a	—N/a
Ahmadiyya	—N/a	—N/a	—N/a	—N/a	—N/a	—N/a	—N/a	—N/a	—N/a	—N/a	—N/a	—N/a	—N/a	—N/a	—N/a	—N/a	—N/a	—N/a	13,433	0.12%	7,139	0.06%
Others	11,284	8.93%	3,932	2.63%	9	0.01%	0	0%	0	0%	0	0%	0	0%	2,457	0.37%	30,337	3.57%	1,701	0.02%	2,339	0.02%
Total population	126,329	100%	149,369	100%	176,854	100%	202,964	100%	228,687	100%	281,781	100%	429,747	100%	671,659	100%	849,333	100%	11,119,985	100%	12,978,661	100%

=== Languages ===
Languages by number of native speakers in the Lahore district
1. Punjabi (73.6%)
2. Urdu (21.1%)
3. Other (5.22%)

The Punjabi language is the most-widely spoken native language in Lahore, with 73.58% of Lahore counting it as their first language according to the 2023 Census. Lahore is the largest Punjabi-speaking city in the world. According to the 2023 Pakistani census 21.1% speak Urdu, 2.06% Pashto, 2.01% Mewati and 2.78% other mother tongues.

Urdu and English are used as official languages and as mediums of instruction and media administration. However, Punjabi is also taught at graduation level and used in theatres, films, and newspapers from Lahore. Several Lahore-based prominent educational leaders, researchers, and social commentators have demanded that the Punjabi language should be declared as the medium of instruction at the primary level and be used officially in the Punjab Assembly, Lahore.

== Cityscape ==
=== Old City ===
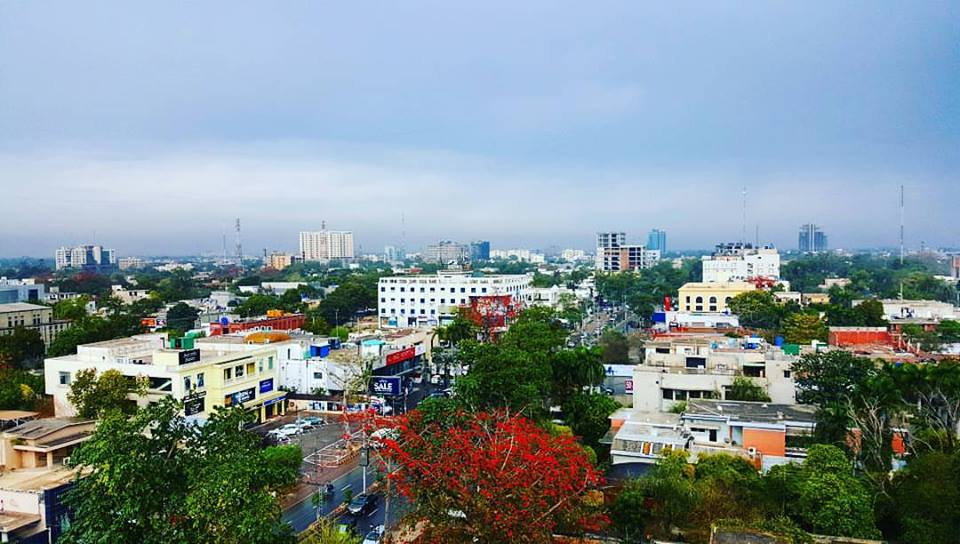
Cityscape of Lahore

Lahore's modern cityscape consists of the historic Walled City of Lahore in the northern part of the city, which contains several World Heritage Sites and national heritage sites. Lahore's urban planning was not based on geometric design but was instead built piecemeal, with small cul-de-sacs, as katrahs and galis developed in the context of neighbouring buildings. Though certain neighbourhoods were named for particular religious or ethnic communities, the neighbourhoods themselves typically were diverse and were not dominated by the namesake group.

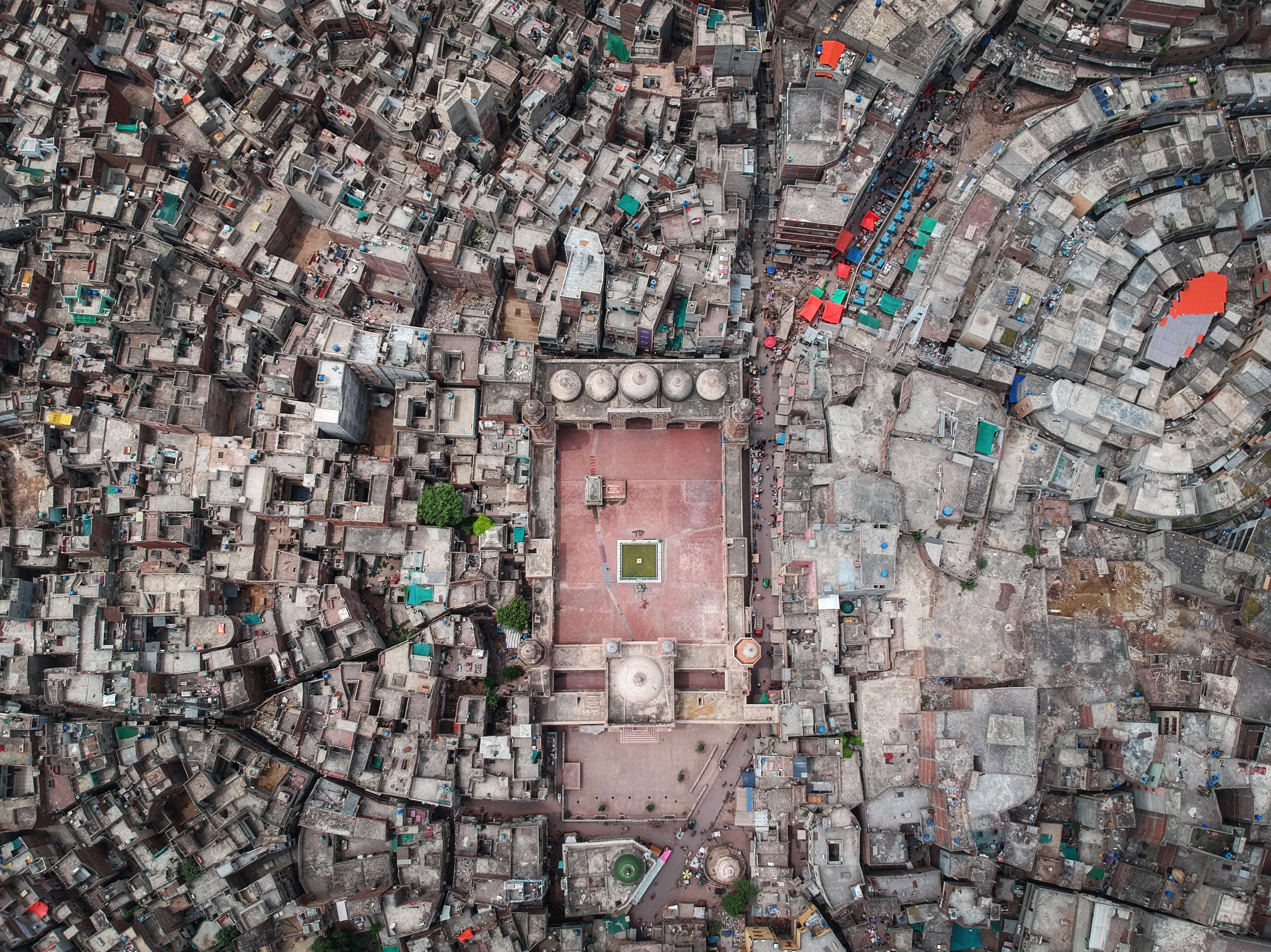
The area around the Wazir Khan Mosque exemplifies the Walled City's urban form

Lahore's urban typology is similar to other ancient cities in South Asia, such as Peshawar, Multan and Delhi – all of which were founded near a major river, and included an old walled city and royal citadel.

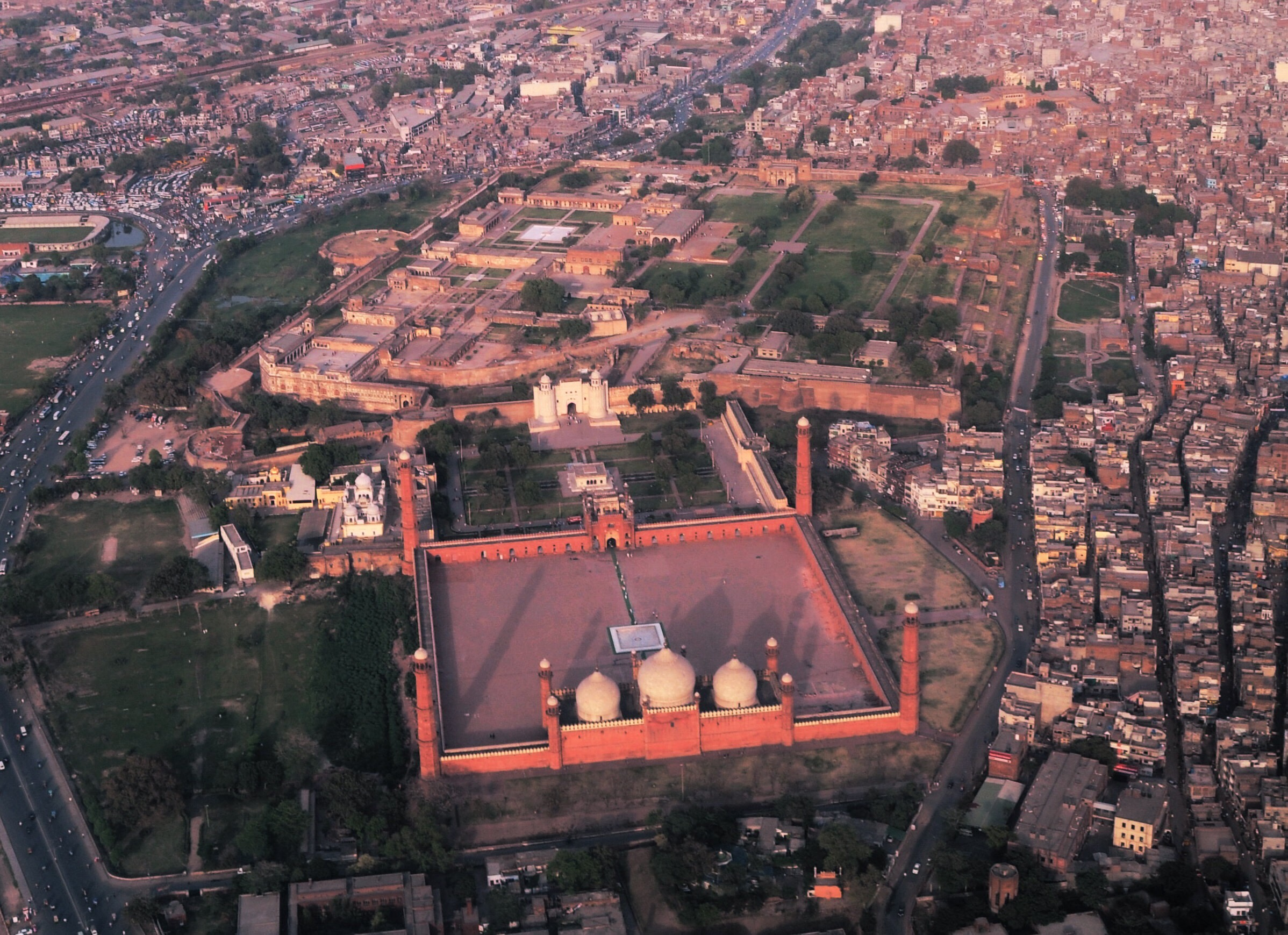
Lahore's Hazuri Bagh is at the centre of an ensemble of Mughal and Sikh era monuments, including the Badshahi Mosque, Lahore Fort, Roshnai Gate, and the Samadhi of Ranjit Singh.

By the end of the Sikh rule, most of Lahore's massive haveli compounds had been occupied by settlers. New neighbourhoods occasionally grew up entirely within the confines of an old Mughal haveli, such as the Mohallah Pathan Wali, which grew within the ruins of a haveli of the same name, built by Mian Khan. By 1831, all Mughal Havelis in the Walled City had been encroached upon by the surrounding neighbourhood, leading to the modern-day absence of any Mughal Havelis in Lahore.

A total of thirteen gates once surrounded the historic walled city. Some of the remaining gates include the Raushnai Gate, Masti Gate, Yakki Gate, Kashmiri Gate, Khizri Gate, Shah Burj Gate, Akbari Gate, and Lahori Gate. Southeast of the walled city is the spacious British-era Lahore Cantonment.

=== Bazaars ===
The city also contains many bazaars. Some are as follows in the old walled-city: Sarafa Bazaar, Copper and Brass Bazaar, Kashmiri Bazaar, Lakshami Bazaar, Shah Almi Bazaar, Soha Bazaar, and Dabi Bazaar. Other bazaars found outside of the walled-city includes Anarkali Bazaar, Ichra Bazaar, Garhi Shahu Bazaar, Landa Bazaar, Sadar Bazaar, Urdu Bazaar, and Naulakha Bazaar.

=== Architecture ===
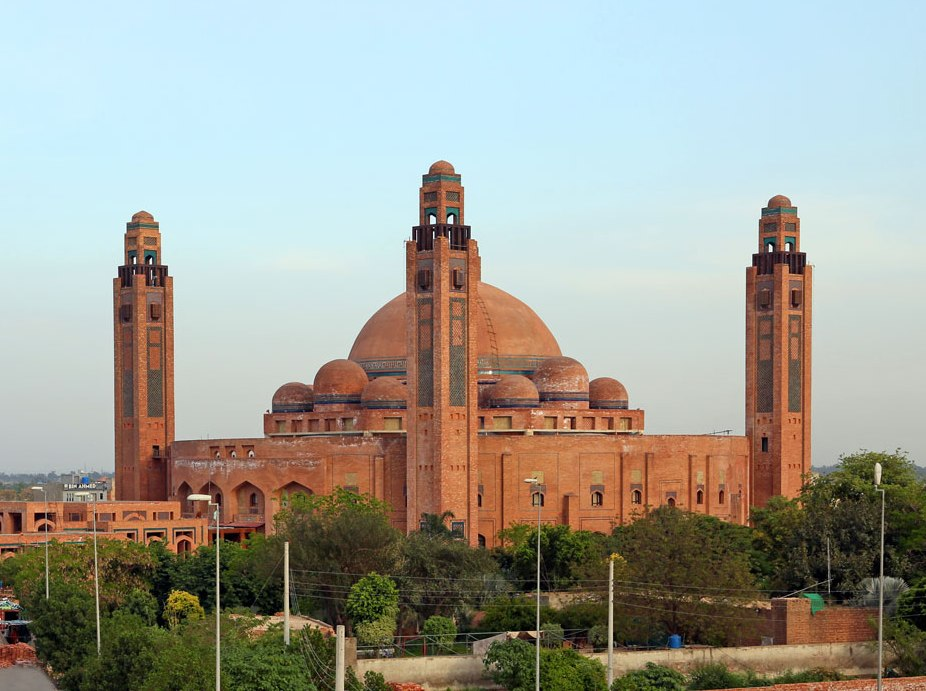
Built in 2012, Grand Jamia Mosque in southern Lahore is a blend of Mughal and modern architecture.

Lahore is home to numerous monuments from the Mughal Empire, Sikh Empire, and the British Indian Raj. The architectural style of the Walled City of Lahore has traditionally been influenced by Mughal and Sikh styles.

==== Sikh period ====
By the arrival of the Sikh Empire at the end of the 18th century, rebuilding efforts under Ranjit Singh and his successors were influenced by Mughal practices, and Lahore was known as the 'City of Gardens' during the Ranjit Singh period. Later, British maps of the area surrounding Lahore dating from the mid-19th century show many walled private gardens which were confiscated from the Muslim noble families bearing the names of prominent Sikh nobles – a pattern of patronage which was inherited from the Mughals.

While much of Lahore's Mughal-era fabric lay in ruins by the time of his arrival, Ranjit Singh's army's plundered most of Lahore's most precious Mughal monuments, and stripped the white marble from several monuments to send to different parts of the Sikh Empire. Monuments plundered of their marble include the Tomb of Asif Khan and the Tomb of Nur Jahan; the Shalimar Gardens was plundered of much of its marble, and its costly agate gate was stripped. The Sikh state also demolished a number of shrines and monuments laying outside the city's walls.

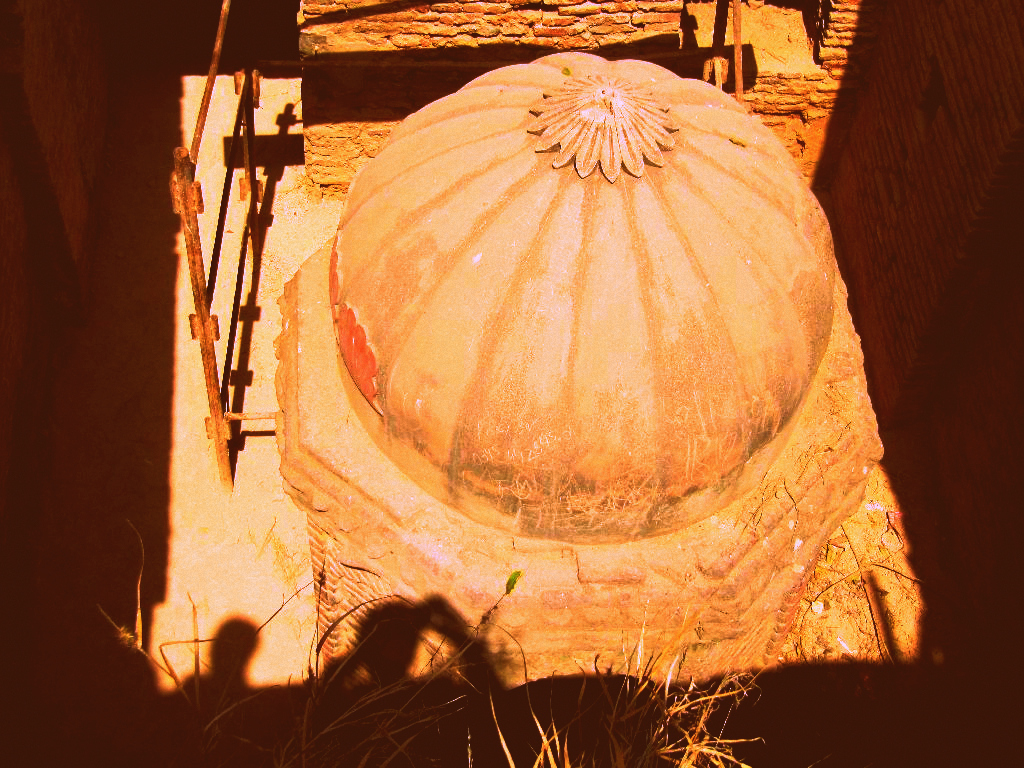
The Lava Temple at the Lahore Fort dates from the Sikh period, and is dedicated to the Hindu deity Lava

Still, Sikh rule left Lahore with several monuments, and a heavily altered Lahore Fort. Ranjit Singh's rule restored some of Lahore's previous grandeur, however also damaged or destroyed a number of Mughal historical monuments, Several havelis were built during the Sikh era, though only a few still remain.

==== British period ====
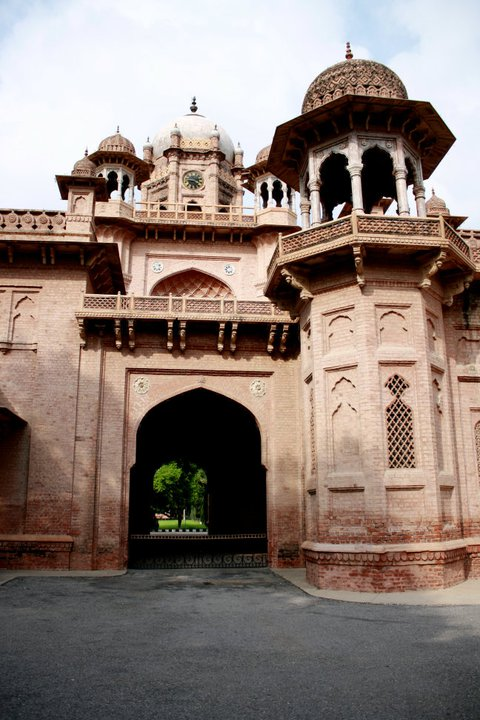
A syncretic architectural style that blends Islamic, Hindu, and Western motifs took root during the colonial era, as shown at Aitchison College.

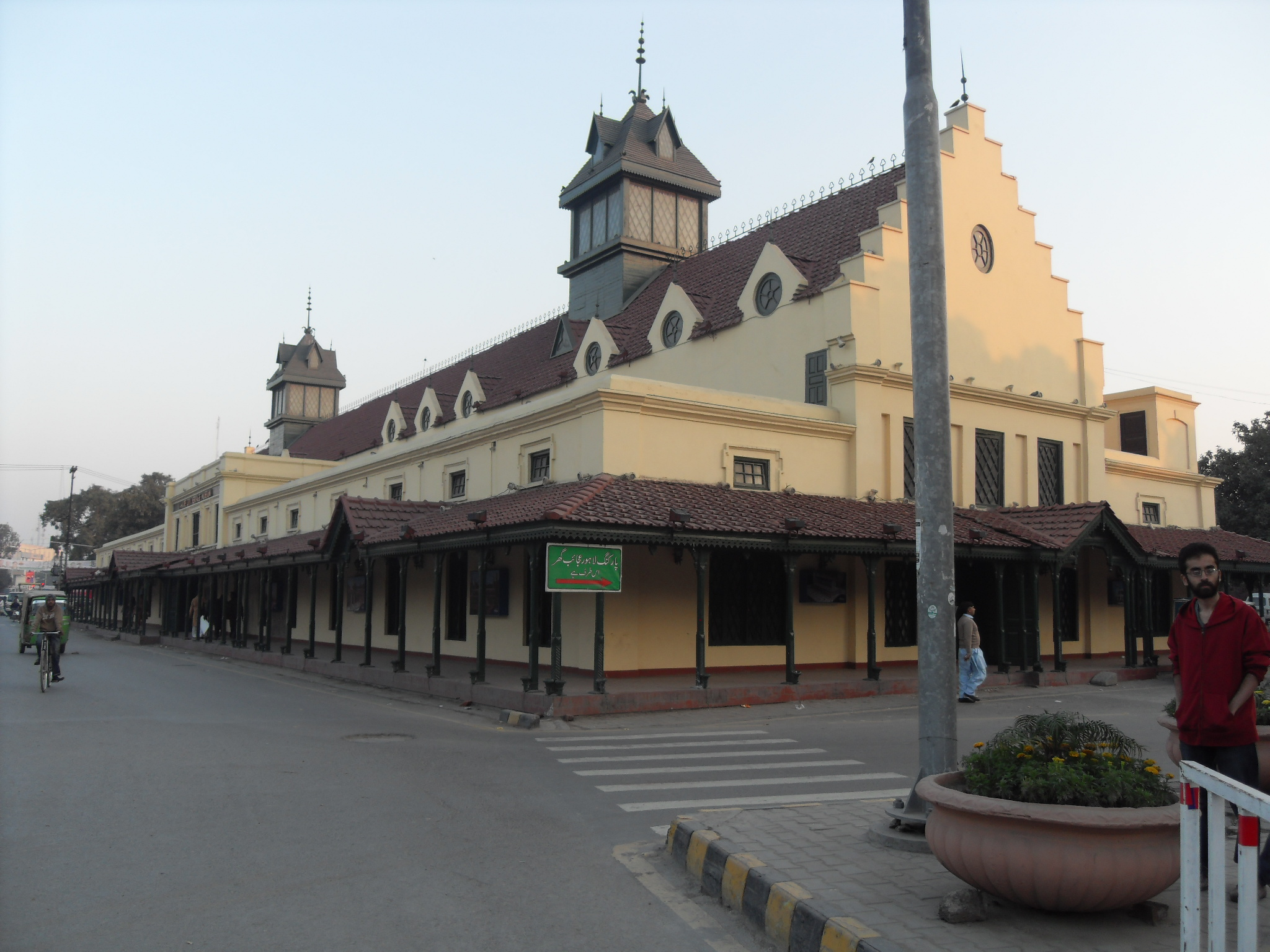
Much of old Lahore features colonial-era buildings, such as the Tollinton Market.

As the capital of British Punjab, the city derived much of its architecture from British colonialists. Structures were built predominantly in the Indo-Gothic style – a syncretic architectural style that blends elements of Victorian and Islamic architecture or in the distinct Indo-Saracenic style. The British also built neoclassical Montgomery Hall, which today serves as the Quaid-e-Azam Library.

Lawrence Gardens were also laid near Civil Station, and were paid for by donations solicited from both Lahore's European community, as well as from wealthy locals. The gardens featured over 600 species of plants, and were tended to by a horticulturist sent from London's Royal Botanic Gardens at Kew.

The leafy suburbs to the south of the Old City, as well as the Cantonment southwest of the Old City, were largely developed under British colonial rule, and feature colonial-era buildings built alongside leafy avenues.

The British authorities built several important structures around the time of the Golden Jubilee of Queen Victoria in 1887 in the distinctive Indo-Saracenic style, such as the Lahore Museum and Mayo School of Industrial Arts. Other prominent examples of the Indo-Saracenic style in Lahore include Lahore's prestigious Aitchison College, the Punjab Chief Court (today the Lahore High Court), Lahore Museum, and the University of the Punjab.

Many of Lahore's most important buildings were designed by civil engineer and architect Sir Ganga Ram, who is considered "the father of modern Lahore".

=== Parks and gardens ===
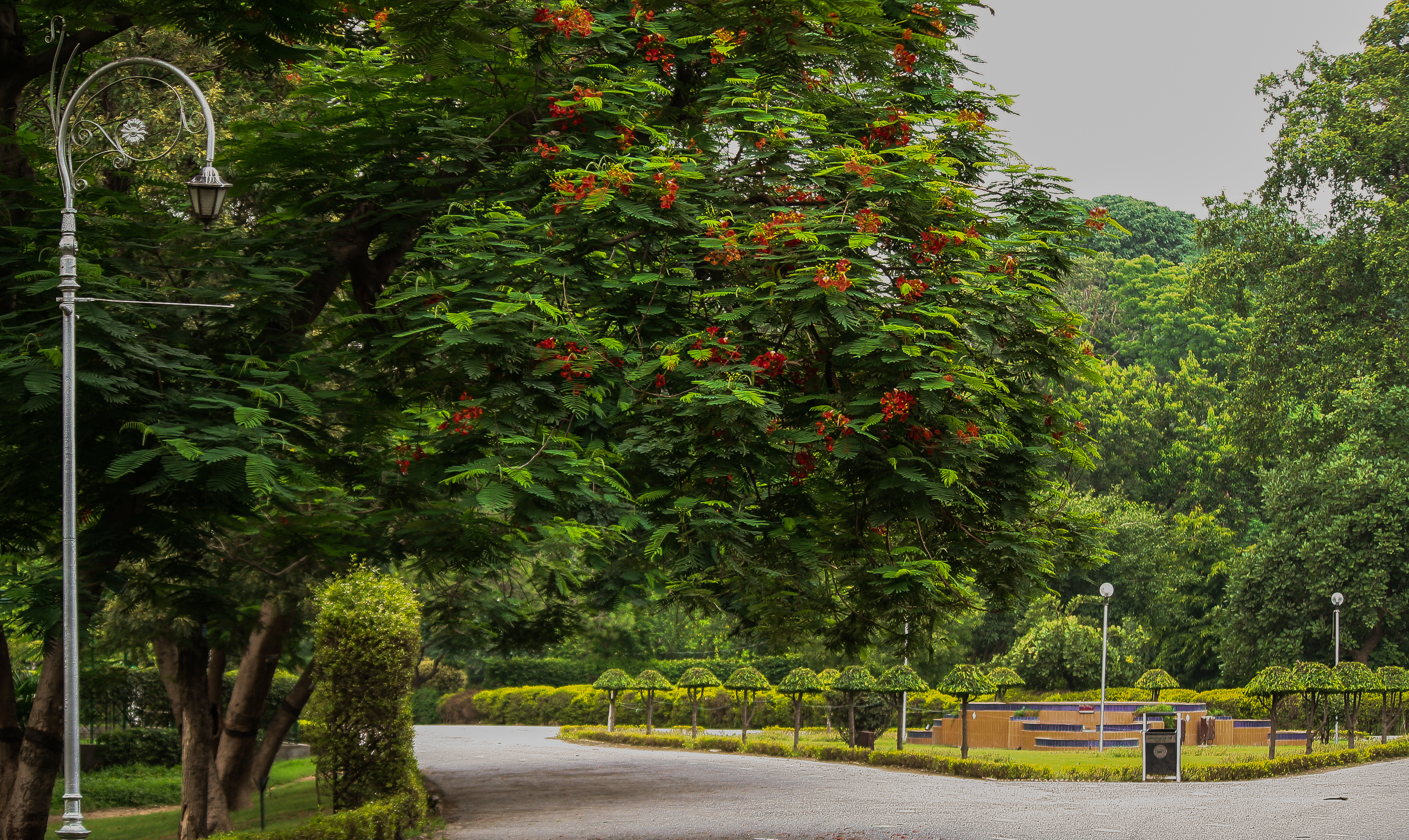
Lahore's Bagh-e-Jinnah was laid in 1862 as the Lawrence Garden.

Lahore is also known as "the city of gardens" due to its large number of gardens. The Shahdara Bagh was one of the earliest Mughal gardens, laid out in 15th century, and contains the Tomb of Jahangir. The Shalimar Gardens were laid out during the reign of Shah Jahan and were designed to mimic the Islamic paradise of the afterlife described in the Qur'an. The gardens follow the familiar charbagh layout of four squares, with three descending terraces. In 1818, Hazuri Bagh was built during reign of Ranjit Singh to celebrate his capture of the Koh-i-Noor diamond from Shuja Shah Durrani.

The Lawrence Garden was established in 1862 and was originally named after Sir John Lawrence, late 19th-century British Viceroy to India. The Circular Garden, which surrounds the Walled City on three sides, was established by 1892. The former parade ground adjacent to Badshahi Mosque was also renamed during the British era as Minto Park, which after restoration was re-established as Iqbal Park.

The many other gardens and parks in the city include Hazuri Bagh, Iqbal Park, Mochi Bagh, Gulshan-e-Iqbal Park, Model Town Park, Jilani Park, Nasir Bagh Lahore, Jallo Park, Lahore Zoo Safari Park, and Changa Manga, a human-made forest near Lahore in the Kasur district. Another example is the Bagh-e-Jinnah, a 141-acre (57 ha) botanical garden that houses entertainment and sports facilities as well as a library.

== Economy ==
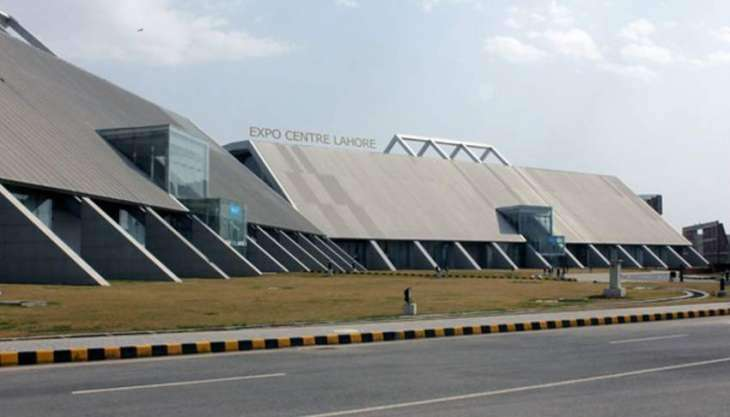
Expo Centre Lahore

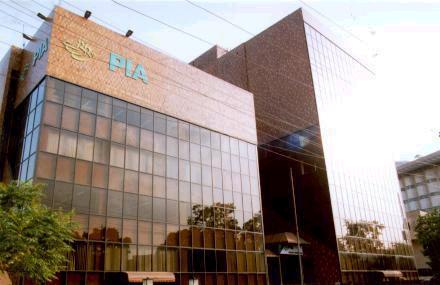
PIA Head Office

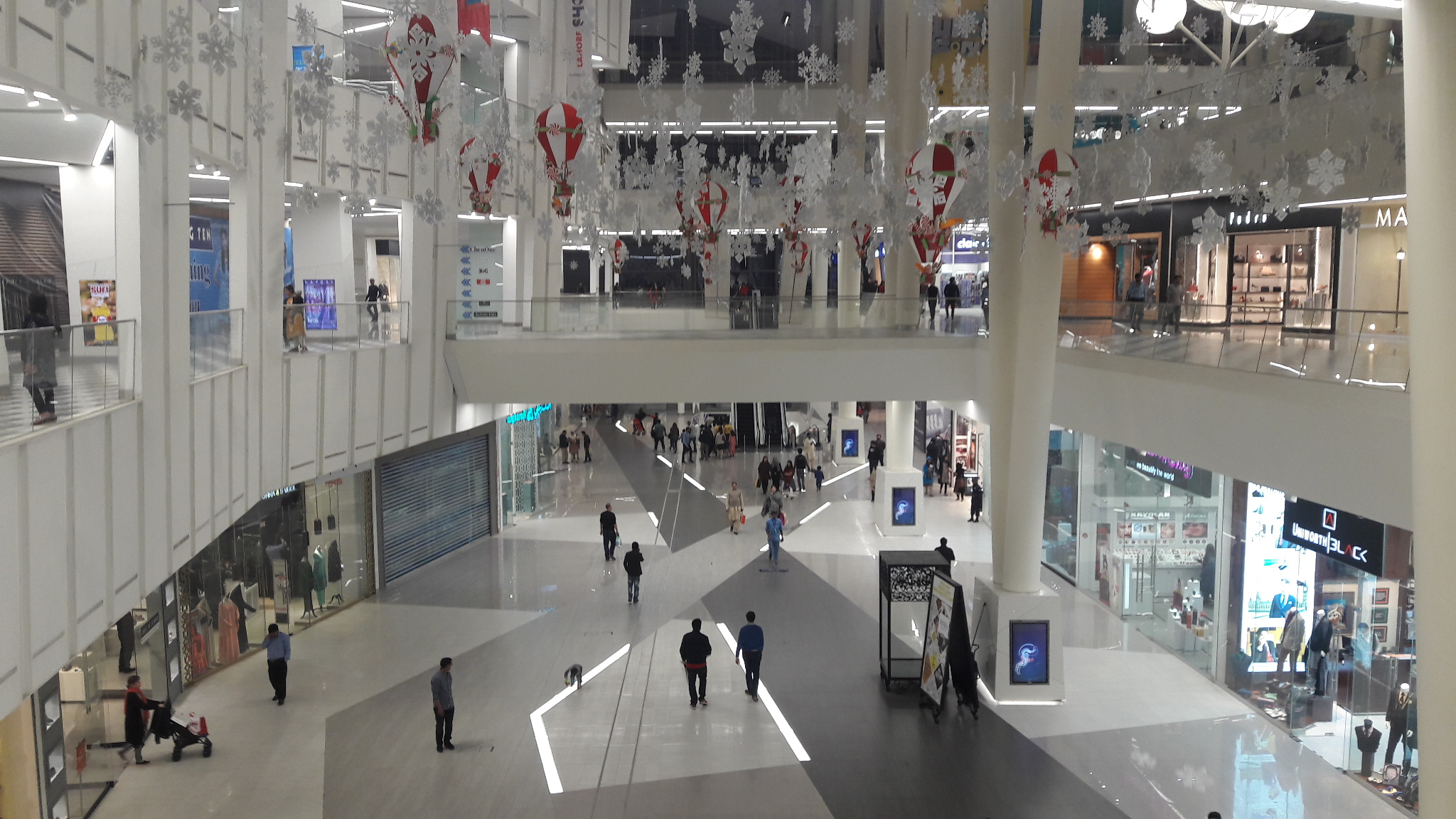
Emporium Mall

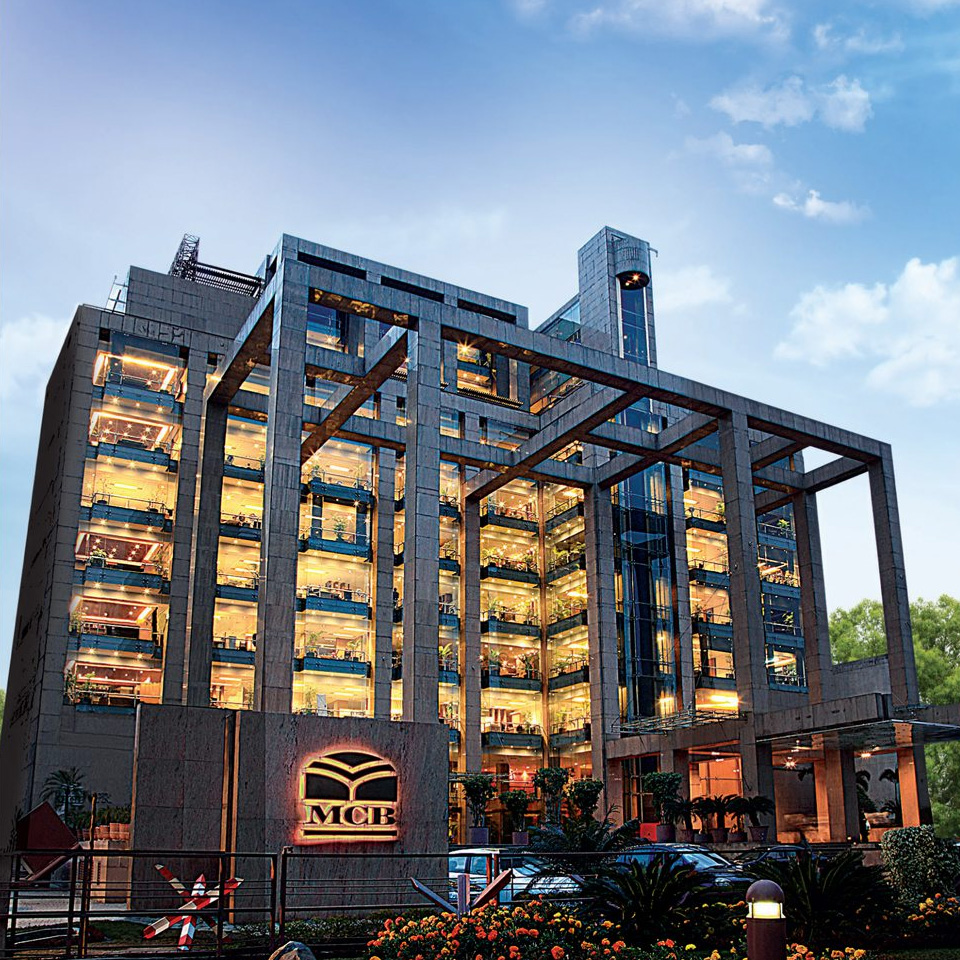
MCB headquarters

As of 2008, the city's gross domestic product (GDP) by purchasing power parity (PPP) was estimated at $40 billion with a projected average growth rate of 5.6 per cent. This is on par with Karachi, Pakistan's economic hub, with Lahore (having half the population) fostering an economy that is 51% of the size of Karachi's ($78 billion in 2008). It is estimated that Lahore contributes 11.5% to the national economy, and 19% to the provincial economy of Punjab. As a whole, Punjab has a $115 billion economy, making it the first (and to date, only) Pakistani Subdivision with an economy of more than $100 billion, at the rank 144. Lahore's GDP is projected to be $102 billion by 2025, with a slightly higher growth rate of 5.6% per annum, as compared to Karachi's 5.5%.

A major industrial agglomeration with about 9,000 industrial units, Lahore has shifted in recent decades from manufacturing to service industries. Some 42% of its workforce is employed in finance, banking, real estate, community, cultural, and social services. The city is Pakistan's largest software and hardware producing centre, and hosts a growing computer-assembly industry. The city has always been a centre for publications; 80% of Pakistan's books are published in Lahore, and it remains the foremost centre of literary, educational, and cultural activity in Pakistan.

The Lahore Expo Centre is one of the biggest projects in the history of the city and was inaugurated on 22 May 2010. Defence Raya Golf Resort, now fully operational (as of the 2024), boasts Pakistan's largest and Asia's premier golf course. This luxurious project is a result of a partnership between DHA Lahore and BRDB Malaysia, offering world-class residential, recreational, and commercial facilities. The development of such large-scale projects continues to elevate Lahore's profile, contributing significantly to the national economy. Ferozepur Road of the Central business districts of Lahore contains high-rises and skyscrapers including Kayre International Hotel and Arfa Software Technology Park.

== Transport ==
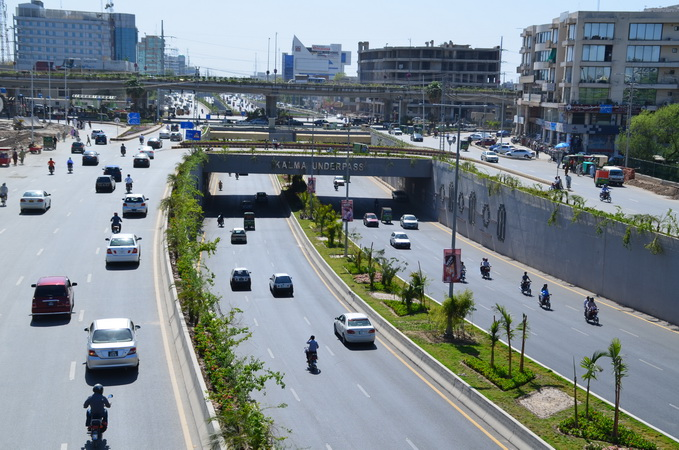
Kalma Underpass

=== Public transportation ===
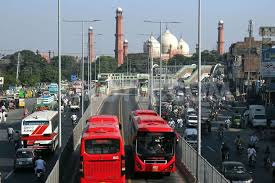
Lahore Metrobus

Lahore's main public transportation system is operated by the Lahore Transport Company (LTC) and Punjab Mass Transit Authority (PMTA). The backbone of its public transport network is the PMTA's Lahore Metrobus and the Orange Line of the Lahore Metro train. LTC and PMTA also operates an extensive network of buses, providing bus service to many parts of the city and acting as a feeder system for the Metrobus. The Orange Line metro spans 27.1 km (16.8 mi) around the city and operates at a speed of 80 km/h (50 mph).

==== Metrobus ====
The Lahore Metrobus is a bus rapid transit service operating in Lahore, Punjab, Pakistan. Lahore Metrobus service is integrated with Lahore Transport Company's local bus service to operate as one urban transport system, providing a connected transit service across Lahore District with connections to neighbouring suburban communities.

==== Low occupancy vehicles ====
Low occupancy vehicle (LOVs)—functionally a medium-sized van or wagon—run on routes throughout the city. They function like buses and operate on many routes throughout the city.

=== Metro Train ===
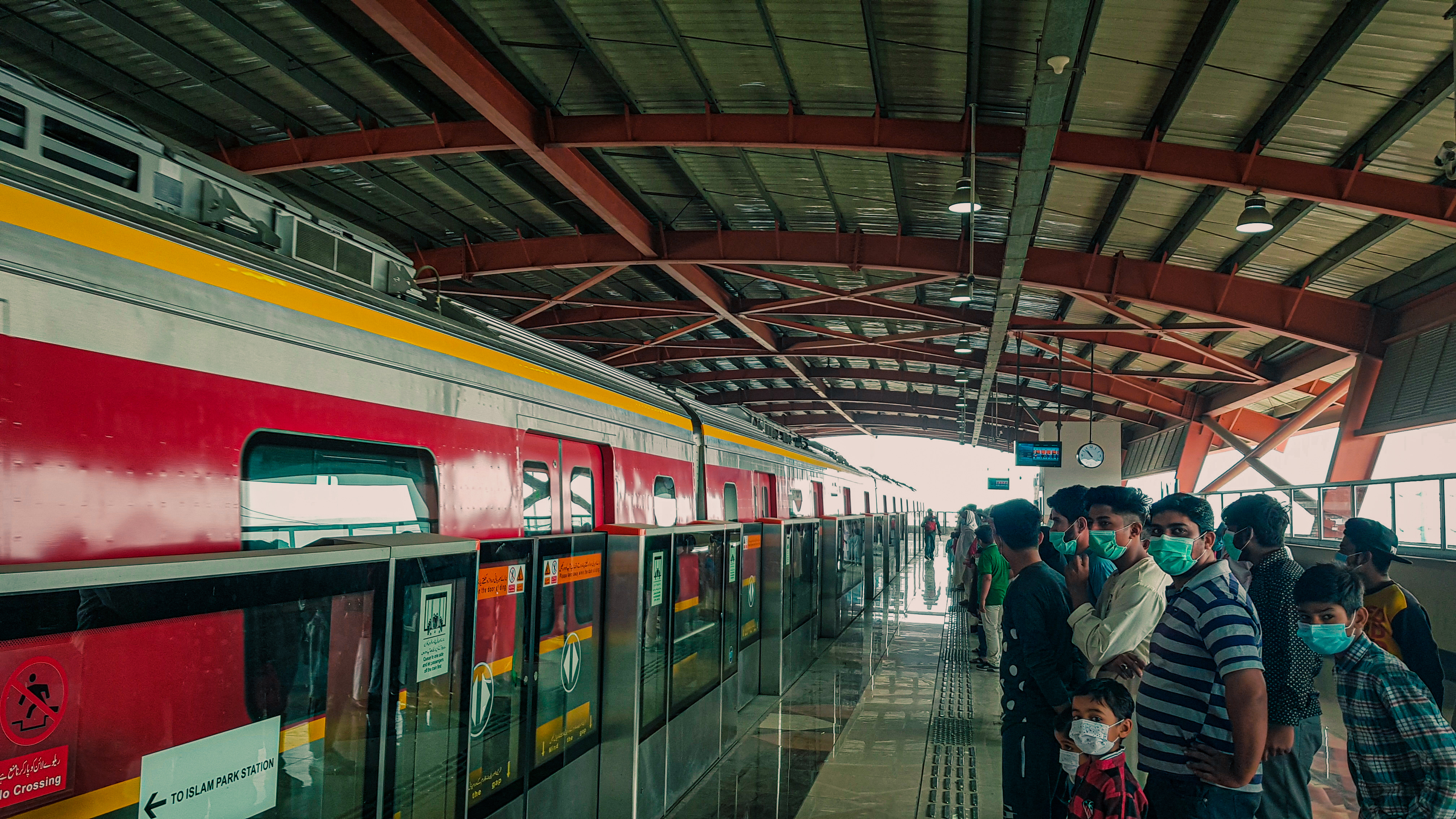
The Orange Line is Pakistan's first metro rail line.

==== Orange Line ====
The Orange Line Metro Train is an automated rapid transit system in Lahore. The Orange line is the first of the three proposed rail lines proposed for the Lahore Metro. As of 2020, it is the primary metro rail line in the city. The line spans 27.1 km (16.8 mi), with 25.4 km (15.8 mi) elevated and 1.72 km (1.1 mi) underground, and had a cost of 251.06 billion rupees ($1.6 billion). The line consists of 26 subway stations (Ali Town Station to Dera Gujran Station) and is designed to carry over 250,000 passengers daily. CRRC Zhuzhou Locomotive rolled out the first of 27 trains for the metro on 16 May 2017. The train has speed up to 80 km/h (50 mph). For improved durability, its bogies are heat-resistant, can manage unstable voltage, and feature energy-saving air-conditioning. Successful initial test trials were run in mid-2018, and commercial operations began on 25 October 2020.

==== Blue Line ====
The Blue Line is a proposed 24 kilometres (15 mi) line from Chauburji to College Road Township. Along the way, it will connect places like Mozang Chungi, Shadman Chowk, Jail Road, Mian Boulevard Gulberg, Mian Boulevard Garden Town, and Faisal Town.

==== Purple Line ====
The Purple Line is a proposed 19 kilometres (12 mi) line from Bhaati Chowk to the Allama Iqbal International Airport. Along the way, it will connect places like Brandreth Road, Railway Station, Allama Iqbal Road, Dharampura, and Ghazi Road.

=== Taxi and rickshaw ===
Ride-sharing services such as Uber and Careem are available in the city. Motorcycle rides are also available in the city, which have been introduced by private companies.

Auto rickshaws play an important role of public transport in Lahore. As of 2019, there were approximately 82,000 auto rickshaws and 65,000 motorcycle rickshaws in the city. Motorcycle rickshaws, usually called chingchi (after the Chinese company Jinan Qingqi Motorcycle Co. Ltd, who first introduced these to the market) or chand gari ('moon car') are cheaper than auto rickshaws and provide a shared ride experience for multiple passengers and fares, whereas auto rickshaws cater to only one passenger or group for a fare. Since 2002, all auto rickshaws have been required to use compressed natural gas as fuel, and all-electric rickshaws were introduced in 2023.

=== Intercity transportation ===
==== Railways ====
Lahore Junction Station serves as the main railway station for Lahore, and serves as a major hub for all Pakistan Railways services in Northern Pakistan. It includes services to Peshawar and the national capital metropolitan area of Islamabad–Rawalpindi, and long-distance services to Karachi and Quetta. Lahore Cantonment Station also operates a few trains.

==== Buses ====
Lahore Badami Bagh Bus Terminal (known colloquially as "Lari Adda") serves as a hub for intercity bus services in Lahore, served by multiple bus companies providing a comprehensive network of services in Punjab and neighbouring provinces. Lahore Jinnah Bus Terminal is also a major bus stand in southern Lahore. Apart from these stations, multiple privately owned bus transportation companies operate from Band Road (referred to colloquially as Chowk Yateem Khana), offering intercity transport at varying fares and comfort levels.

=== Airports ===
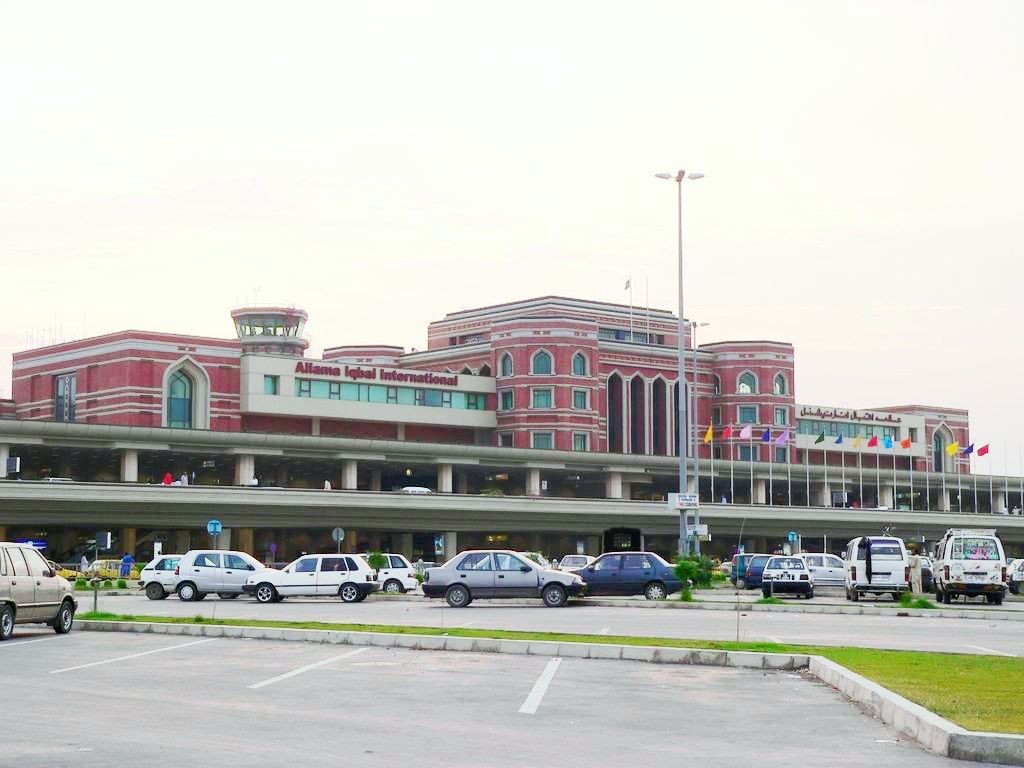
Allama Iqbal International Airport

Pakistan's third busiest airport, Allama Iqbal International Airport (IATA: LHE), straddles the city's eastern boundary. The new passenger terminal was opened in 2003, replacing the old terminal which now serves as a VIP and Hajj lounge. The airport was named after the national poet-philosopher, Muhammad Iqbal, and is a secondary hub for the national carrier, Pakistan International Airlines. Walton Airport in Askari neighbourhood provides general aviation facilities. Sialkot International Airport (IATA: SKT) and Faisalabad International Airport (IATA: LYP) also serve as alternate airports for the Lahore area, in addition to serving their respective cities.

Allama Iqbal International Airport connects Lahore with many cities worldwide (including domestic destinations) by both passenger and cargo flight including Ras al Khaimah, Guangzhou (begins 28 August 2018), Ürümqi, Abu Dhabi, Barcelona, Beijing–Capital, Copenhagen, Dammam, Dera Ghazi Khan, Doha, Dubai–International, Islamabad, Jeddah, Karachi, Kuala Lumpur–International, London–Heathrow, Manchester, Medina, Milan–Malpensa, Multan, Muscat, Oslo–Gardermoen, Paris–Charles de Gaulle, Peshawar, Quetta, Rahim Yar Khan, Riyadh, Salalah, Tokyo–Narita, Toronto–Pearson, Mashhad, Bangkok–Suvarnabhumi, and Tashkent.

=== Roads ===
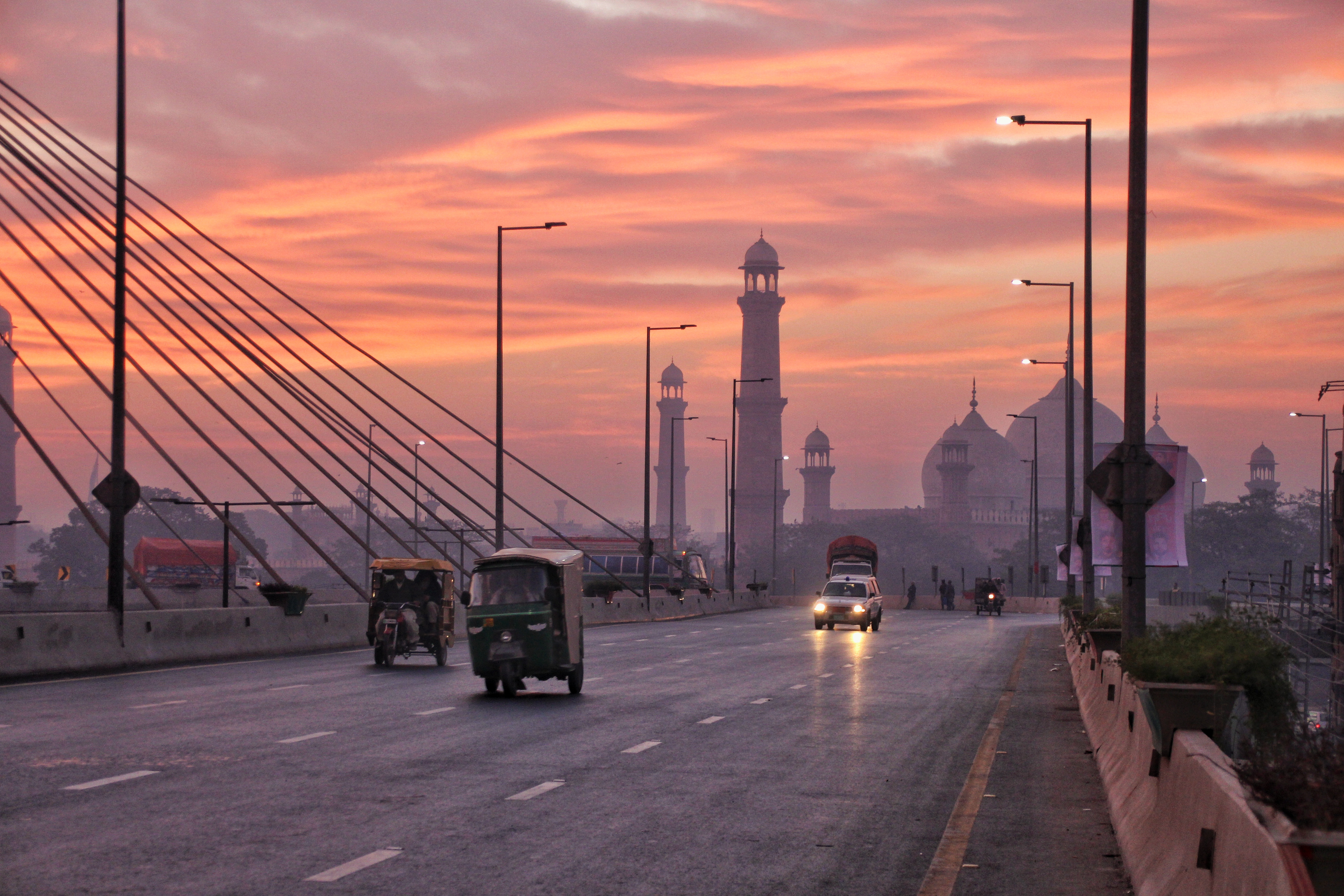
The Azadi Chowk is located near the Badshahi Mosque.

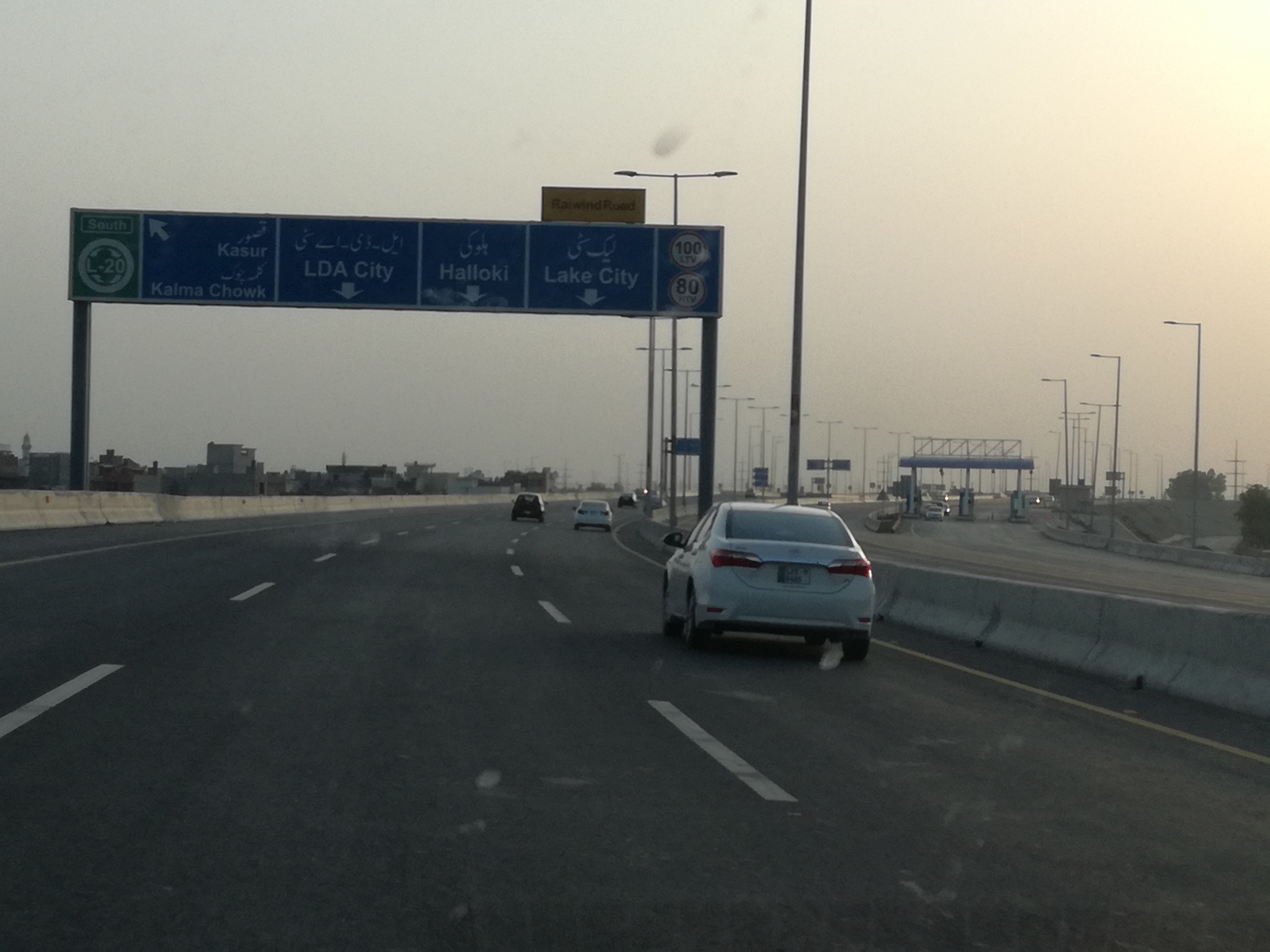
Lahore Ring Road

There are a number of municipal, provincial and federal roads that serve Lahore.

- Municipal roads
  - Canal Road – serves as the major north–south artery
- Provincial highways
  - Lahore Ring Road
  - Lahore–Kasur Road (Ferozepur Road)
  - Lahore–Raiwind Road (Raiwind Road)
  - Lahore–Sharaqpur Road (Sagianwala Bypass Road)
  - Lahore–Wagah Road
  - Grand Trunk Road (G.T Road )
- Federal highways
  - M-2 motorway
  - M-3 motorway
  - M-11 motorway
  - N-5 National Highway (Multan Road)
  - N-60 National Highway (Sargodha–Lahore road)

== Government ==
=== Metropolitan Corporation ===
Under Punjab Local Government Act 2013, Lahore is a metropolitan area under the authority of the Metropolitan Corporation Lahore. The Metropolitan Corporation Lahore is a body consisting of nine deputy mayors (one from each zone in the district) and the city's mayor – all of whom are elected in popular elections. The Metropolitan Corporation approves zoning and land use, coordinates urban design and planning, sets environmental protection laws, and provides municipal services.

==== Mayor ====
As per the Punjab Local Government Act 2013, the Mayor of Lahore is the elected head of the Metropolitan Corporation of Lahore. The mayor is directly elected in municipal elections every four years alongside 9 deputy town mayors. Mubashir Javed of the Pakistan Muslim League (N) was elected mayor of Lahore in 2016. The mayor is responsible for the administration of government services, the composition of councils and committees overseeing Lahore City District departments and serves as the chairperson for the meeting of the Lahore Council. The mayor also functions to help devise long-term development plans in consultation with other stakeholders and bodies to improve the condition, livability, and sustainability of urban areas.

=== Neighbourhoods ===
Lahore District is a subdivision of the Punjab, and is further divided into 9 administrative zones. Each town in turn consists of a group of union councils, of which there are 274 total.

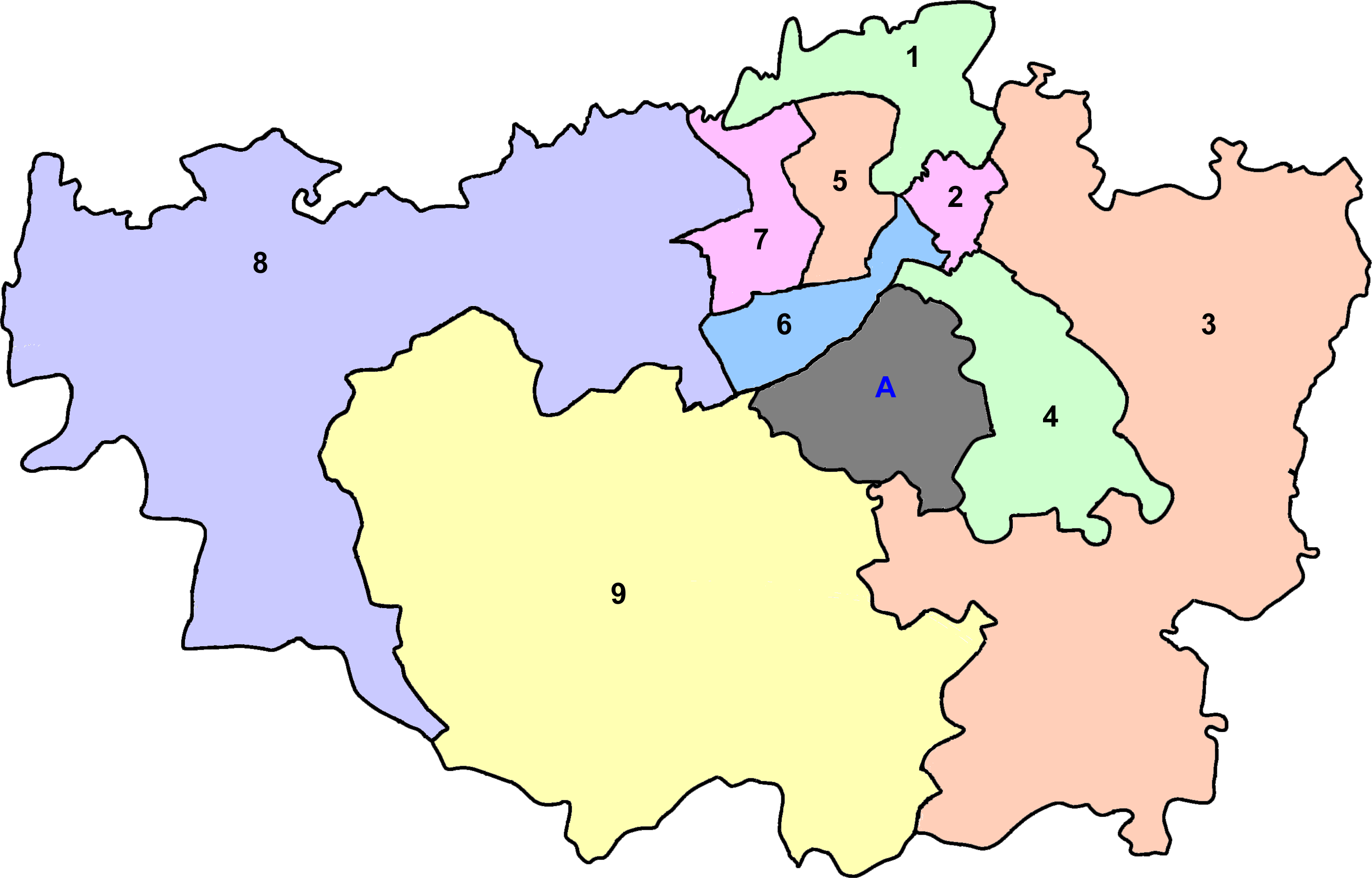
Tehsils of Lahore District: 1. Ravi; 2. Shalimar; 3. Wagha; 4. Aziz Bhatti; 5. Data Gunj Buksh; 6. Gulberg; 7. Samanabad; 8. Iqbal; 9. Nishtar; 10. Cantonment

== Festivals ==
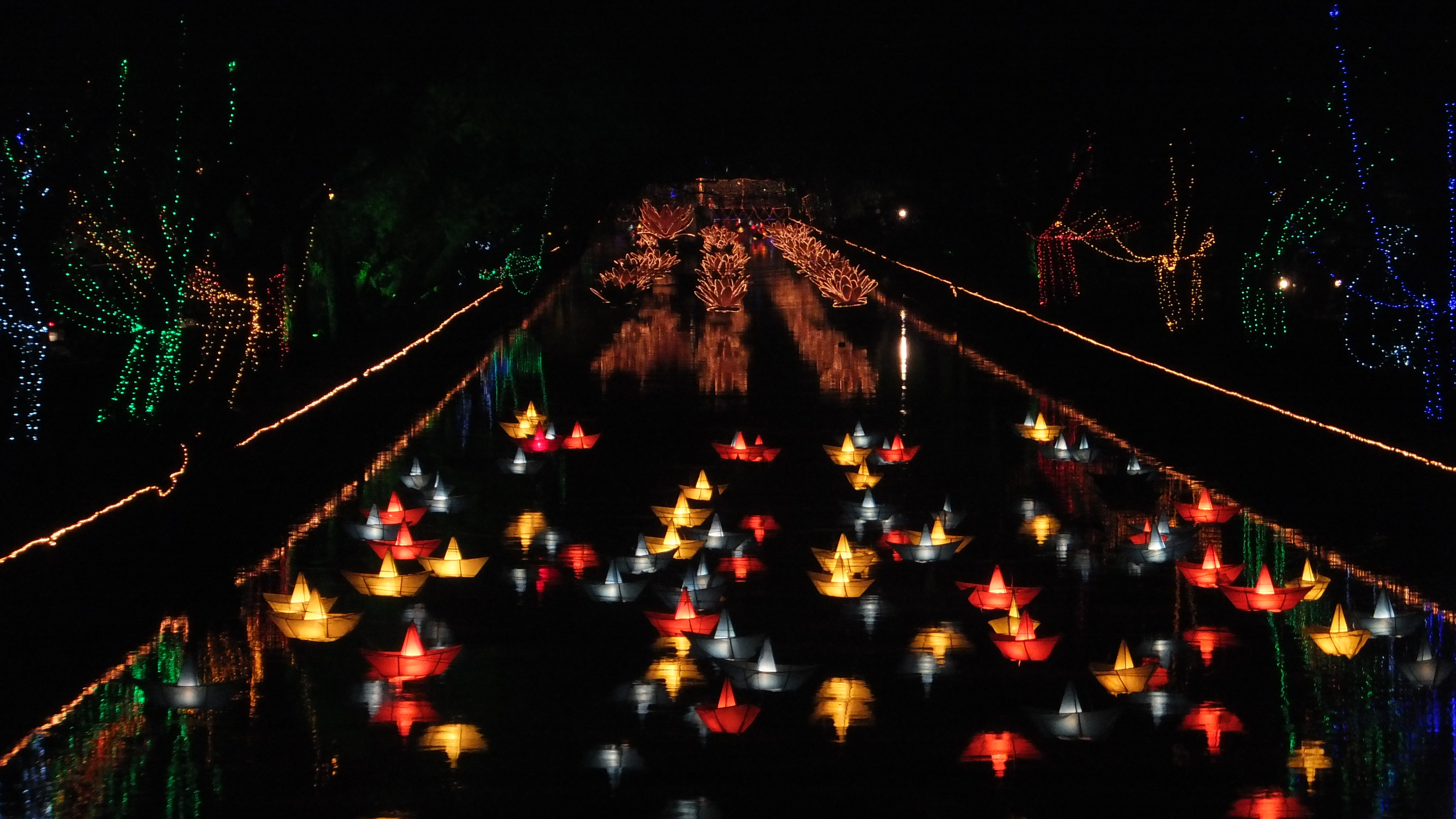
Lahore Canal during the spring Basant festival

The people of Lahore celebrate many festivals and events throughout the year, including Islamic, traditional Punjabi, Christian, and national holidays and festivals.

Some people decorate their houses and light candles to illuminate the streets and houses during public holidays; roads and businesses may be lit for days. Many of Lahore's dozens of Sufi shrines hold annual festivals called urs to honour their respective saints. For example, the mausoleum of Ali al-Hujwiri at the Data Darbar shrine has an annual urs that attracts up to one million visitors per year. The Mela Chiraghan festival in Lahore takes place at the shrine of Madho Lal Hussain, while other large urs take place at the shrines of Bibi Pak Daman, and at the Shrine of Mian Mir. Eid ul-Fitr and Eid ul-Adha are celebrated in the city with public buildings and shopping centres decorated in lights. The people of Lahore also commemorate the martyrdom of Imam Husayn at Karbala with massive processions that take place during the first ten days of the month of Muharram.

Basant is a traditional Punjabi festival that marks the coming of spring. Basant celebrations in Pakistan are centred in Lahore, and people from all over the country and abroad come to the city for the annual festivities. Kite-flying competitions traditionally take place on city rooftops during Basant, while the Lahore Canal is decorated with floating lanterns. Courts have banned kite-flying because of casualties and power installation losses. The ban was lifted for two days in 2007, then immediately reimposed when 11 people were killed by celebratory gunfire, sharp kite-strings, electrocution, and falls related to the competition.

Lahore's churches are elaborately decorated for Christmas and Easter celebrations. Shopping centres and public buildings also feature Christmas installations to celebrate the holiday, even though Christians only constitute 5.1% of the total population of Lahore in 2024. See Religion in Lahore

== Tourism ==
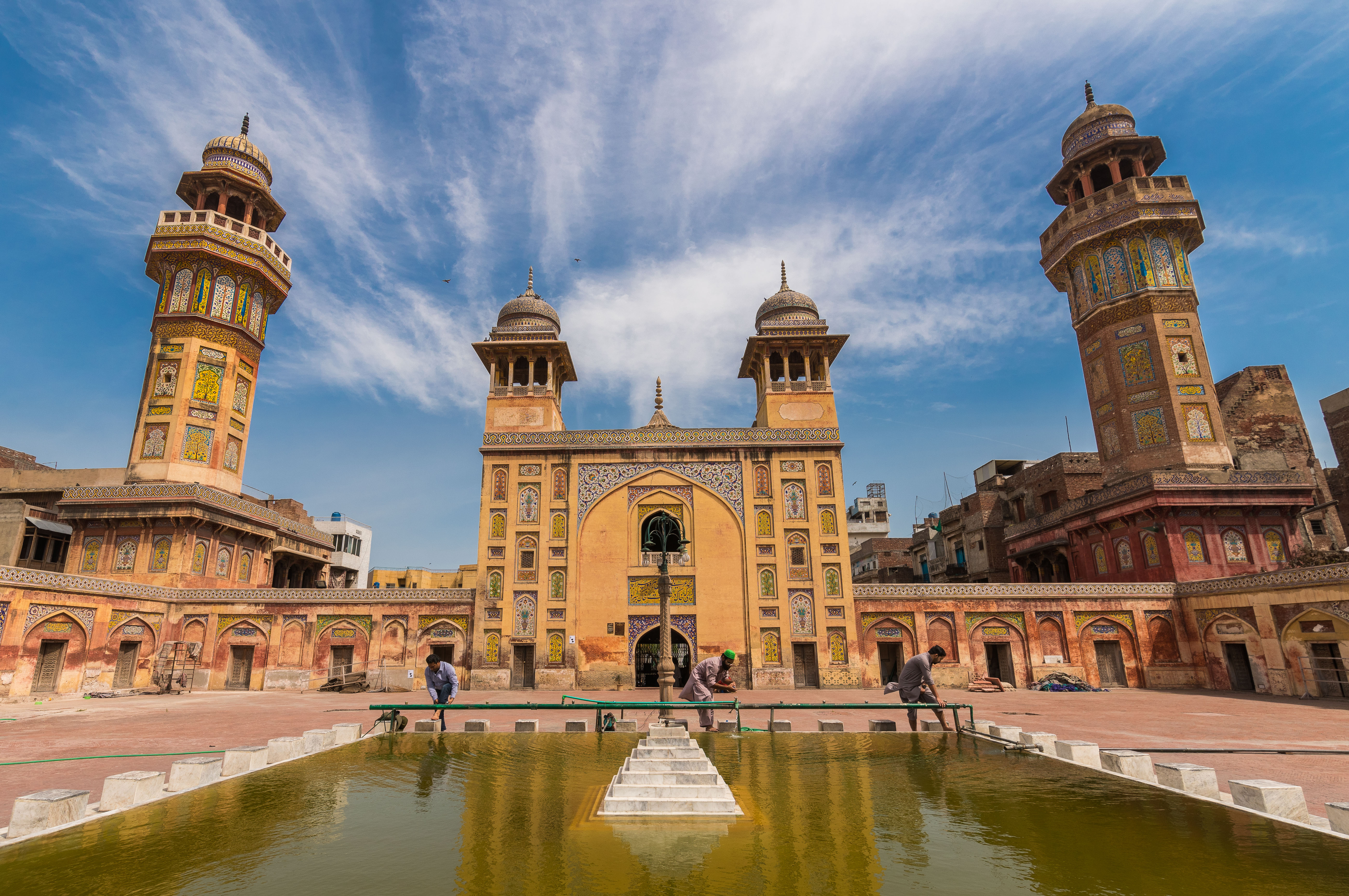
Wazir Khan Mosque

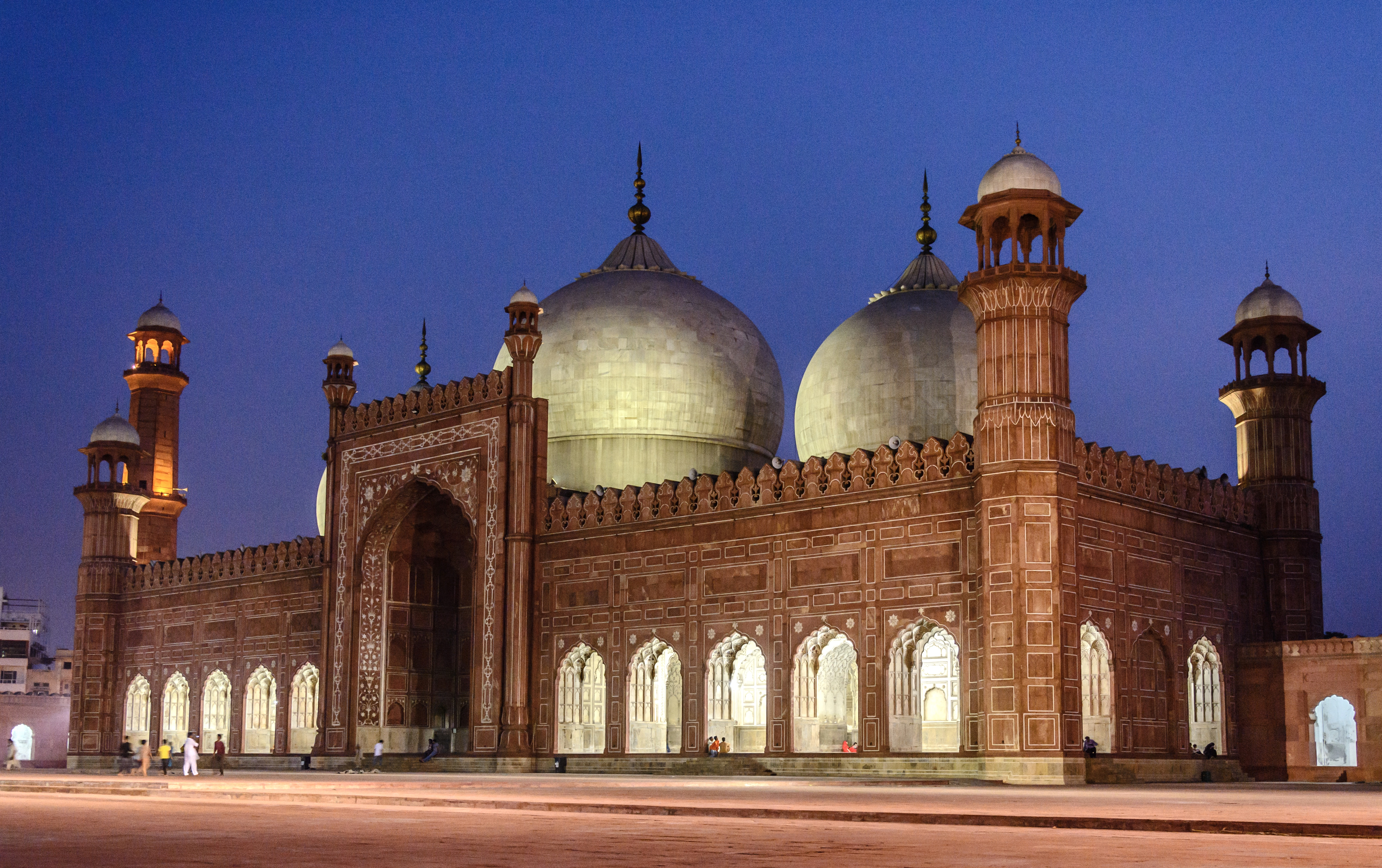
Badshahi Mosque

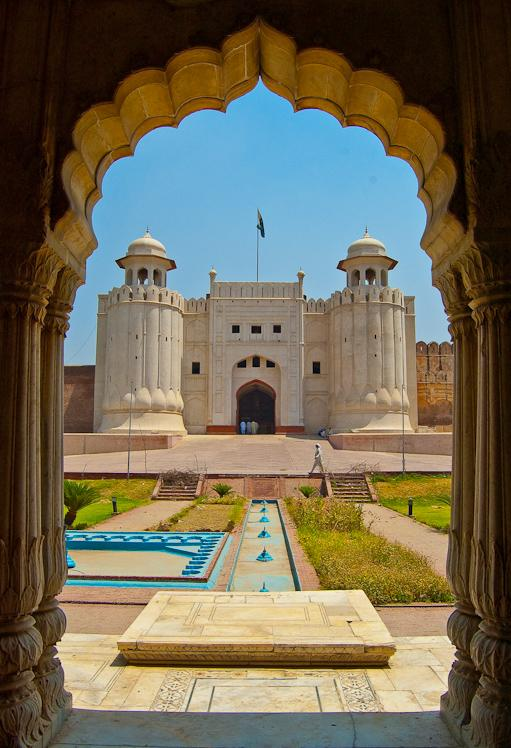
Lahore Fort (Shahi Qila)

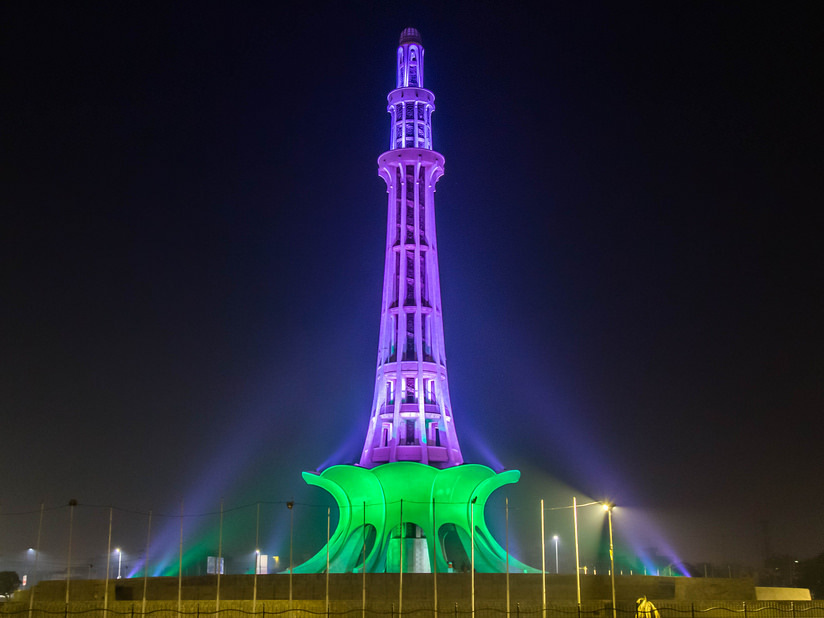
Minar-e-Pakistan at night

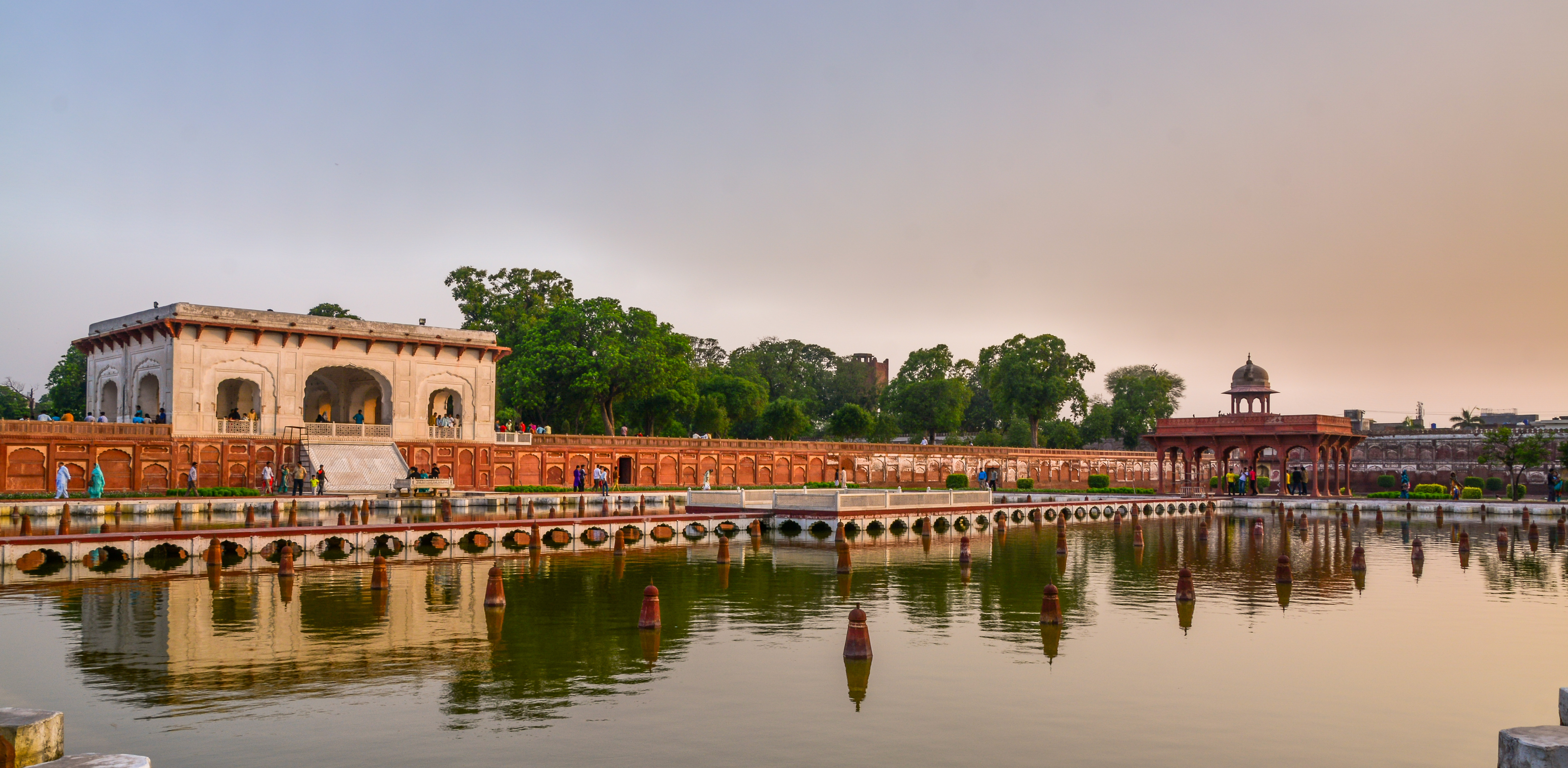
Shalimar Gardens

Lahore remains a major tourist destination in Pakistan. The Walled City of Lahore was renovated in 2014 and is popular due to the presence of UNESCO World Heritage Sites. Among the most popular sights are the Lahore Fort, adjacent to the Walled City, and home to the Sheesh Mahal, the Alamgiri Gate, the Naulakha Pavilion, and the Moti Masjid. The fort and adjoining Shalimar Gardens have been a UNESCO World Heritage Site since 1981.

The city is home to Muslim historical religious sites, most prominently the Badshahi Mosque, constructed in 1673; it was the largest mosque in the world upon construction. Another popular sight is the Wazir Khan Mosque, constructed in 1635 and known for its extensive faience tile work. Data Darbar, near the Old City of Lahore, is the largest Sufi shrine in South Asia. Apart from Islam, two functional Hindu temples exist: the Krishna Temple and Valmiki Mandir. The Samadhi of Ranjit Singh, also located near the Walled City, houses the funerary urns of the Sikh ruler Maharaja Ranjit Singh.

Whereas the Walled City reflects Lahore's historic grandeur, Defence Raya Golf Resort contributes to the city's modern side. Other posh areas include Gulberg, Iqbal Town and the Nahr.

=== Religious sites ===
Well-known religious sites in the city include:

- Badshahi Mosque
- Dai Anga Mosque
- Darbar Madho Lal Hussain
- Data Darbar Complex
- Grand Jamia Mosque, Lahore
- Gurdwara Dera Sahib
- Gurdwara Janam Asthan Guru Ram Das
- Krishna Mandir, Lahore
- Lava Temple
- Lohari Gate Mosque
- Masjid of Mariyam Zamani
- Masjid Shuhada
- Moti Masjid (Lahore Fort)
- Muhammad Saleh Kamboh Mosque
- Neevin Mosque
- Oonchi Mosque
- Sacred Heart Cathedral, Lahore
- Shab Bhar Mosque
- Shaheed Ganj Mosque
- St. Andrew's Presbyterian Church
- Suneri Mosque
- Valmiki Temple
- Wazir Khan Mosque

=== Museums ===
- Army Museum Lahore
- Fakir Khana
- Islamic Summit Minar
- Javed Manzil
- Lahore Museum
- National History Museum
- House of NANNA's by Dr. Ejaz Anwar
- Como Museum of Art
- National Museum of Science and Technology
- Shakir Ali Museum
- Tollinton Market-Lahore City Heritage Museum

=== Tombs ===
- Tomb of Ali Mardan Khan
- Tomb of Allama Iqbal
- Tomb of Anarkali
- Tomb of Asif Khan
- Tomb of Dai Anga
- Tomb of Jani Khan
- Tomb of Jahangir
- Tomb of Nadira Begum
- Tomb of Nur Jahan
- Buddhu's Tomb
- Cypress Tomb or Sarowala Maqbara
- Tomb of Zeb-un-Nissa Begum
- Tomb of Gul Begum
- Tomb of Malik Ayaz
- Kuri Bagh
- Mai Dai
- Mian Khan
- Nusrat Khan
- Prince Pervez
- Qutb-ud-din Aibak
- Saleh Kamboh
- Mir Niamat Khan
- Rasul Shahyun
- Zafar Jang Kokaltash

=== Shrines ===
- Bibi Pak Daman
- Ali Hujwiri
- Mian Mir
- Madho Lal Hussain
- Khawaja Tahir Bandgi
- Ghazi Ilm Din Shaheed
- Sheikh Musa Ahangar
- Khawaja Mehmud
- Nizam-ud-Din
- Siraj-ud-Din Gilani
- Peer Makki
- Baba Shah Jamal

=== Samadhis ===
- Bhai Vasti Ram
- Ranjit Singh
- Samadhi of Bhai Mani Singh
- Sir Ganga Ram
- Bhai Taru Singh

=== Havelis ===
There are many havelis inside the Walled City of Lahore, some in good condition while others need urgent attention. Many of these havelis are fine examples of Mughal and Sikh architecture. Some of the havelis inside the Walled City include:

- Chuna Mandi Havelis
- Dina Nath Ki Haveli
- Haveli Barood Khana
- Haveli Mian Khan (Rang Mehal)
- Haveli of Nau Nihal Singh
- Haveli Shergharian (near Lal Khou)
- Haveli Sir Wajid Ali Shah (near Nisar Haveli)
- Lal Haveli beside Mochi Bagh
- Mubarak Begum Haveli – Bhatti Gate
- Mubarak Haveli – Chowk Nawab Sahib, Mochi/Akbari Gate
- Mughal Haveli (residence of Maharaja Ranjeet Singh)
- Nisar Haveli
- Salman Sirhindi ki Haveli

=== Other landmarks ===
- Shahi Hammam
- Alhamra Art Council
- Lahore Royal Fort
- Greater Iqbal Park

=== Historic neighbourhoods ===
- Anarkali
- Badami Bagh
- Baghbanpura
- Begampura
- Chuna Mandi
- Heera Mandi
- Mughalpura
- Shahdara Bagh
- Walled City of Lahore

== Education ==
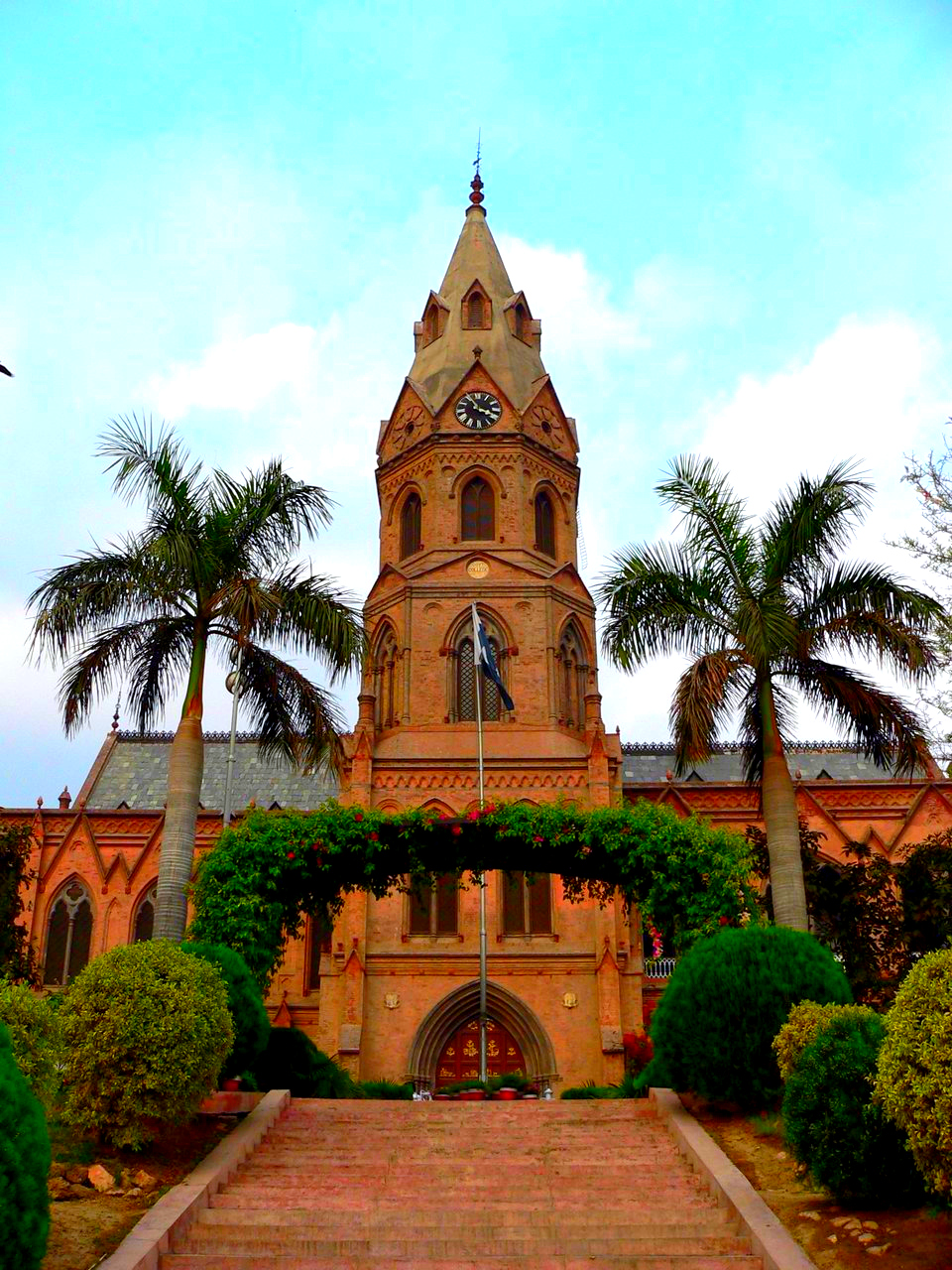
Government College University

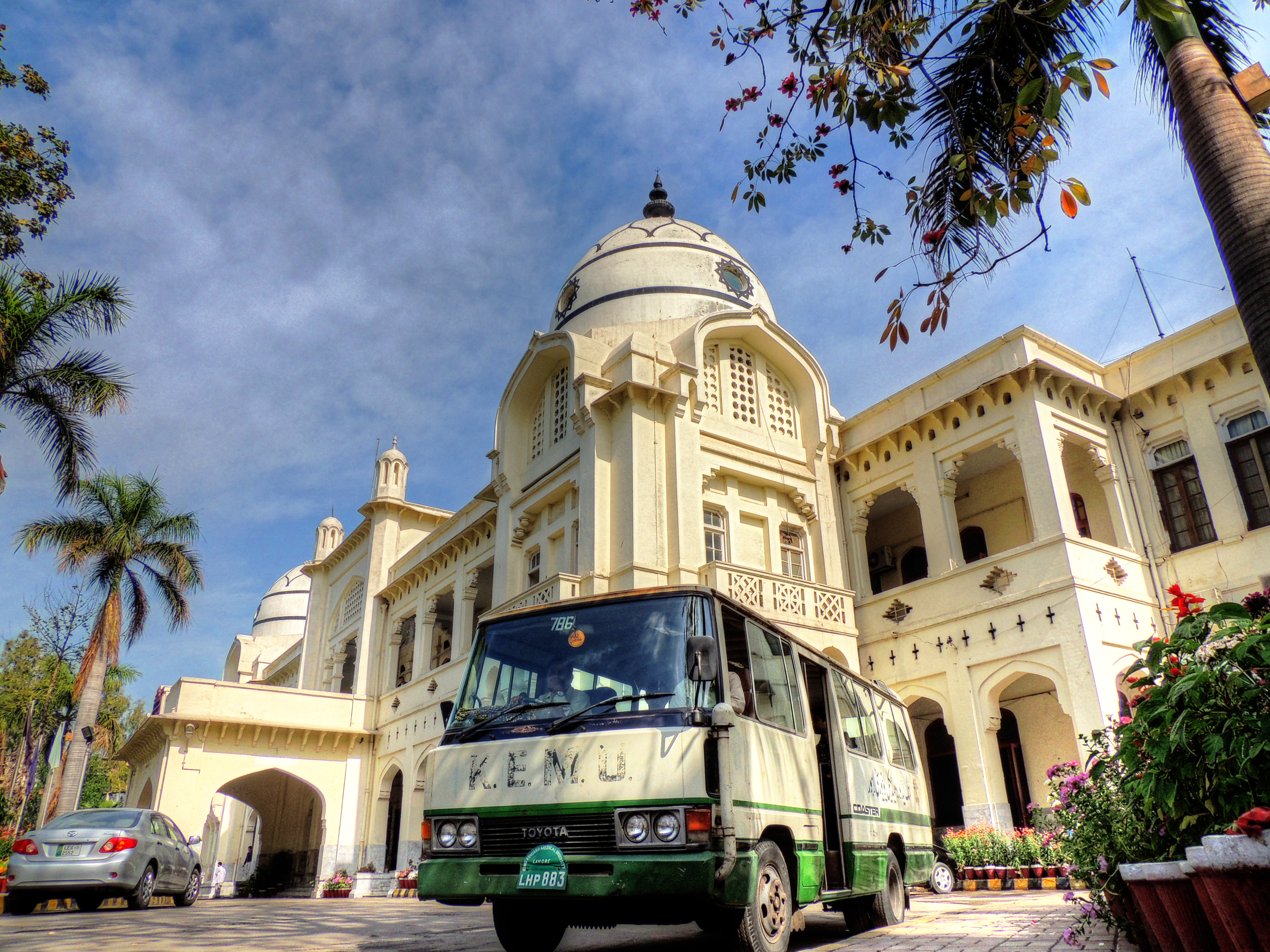
King Edward Medical University

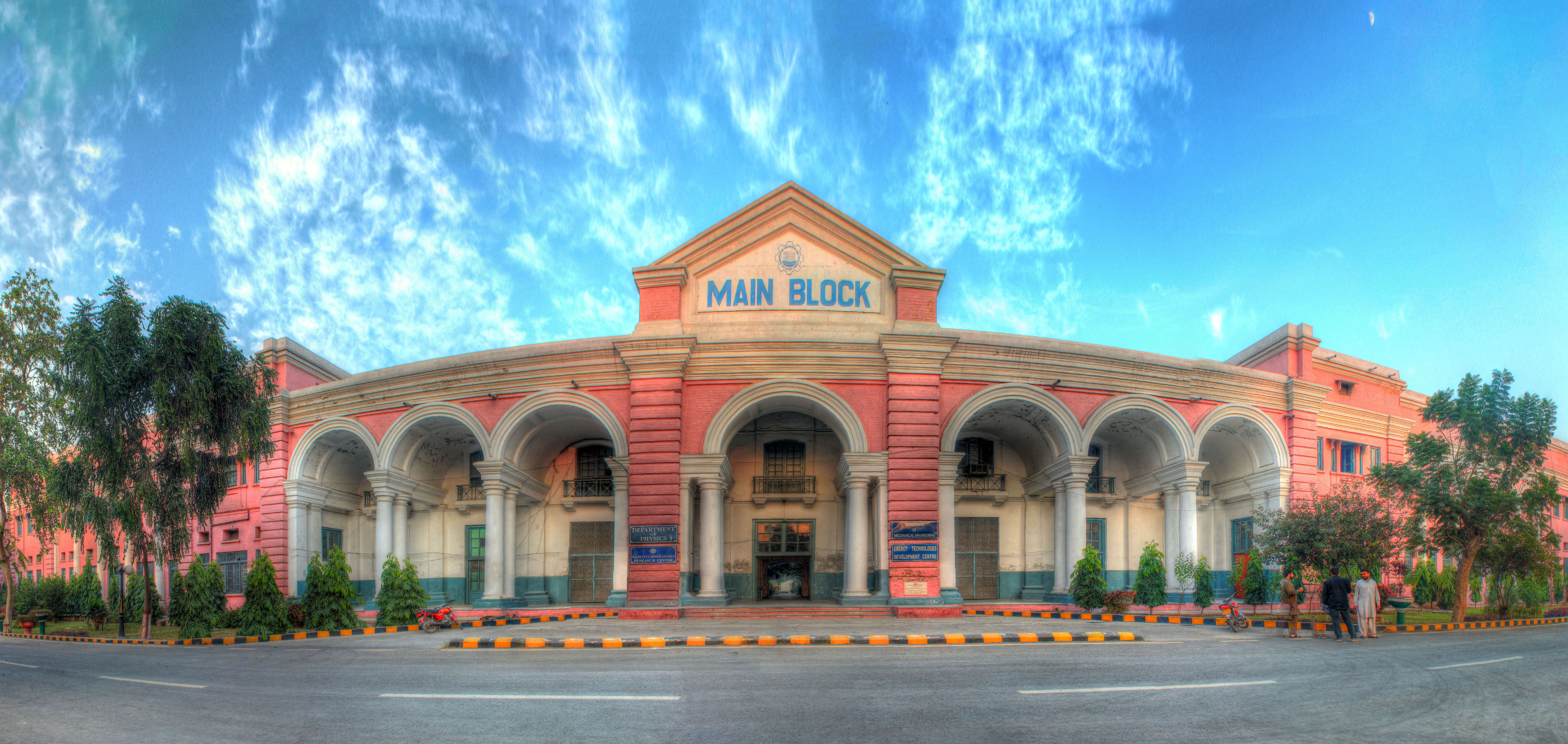
University of Engineering and Technology, Main Block

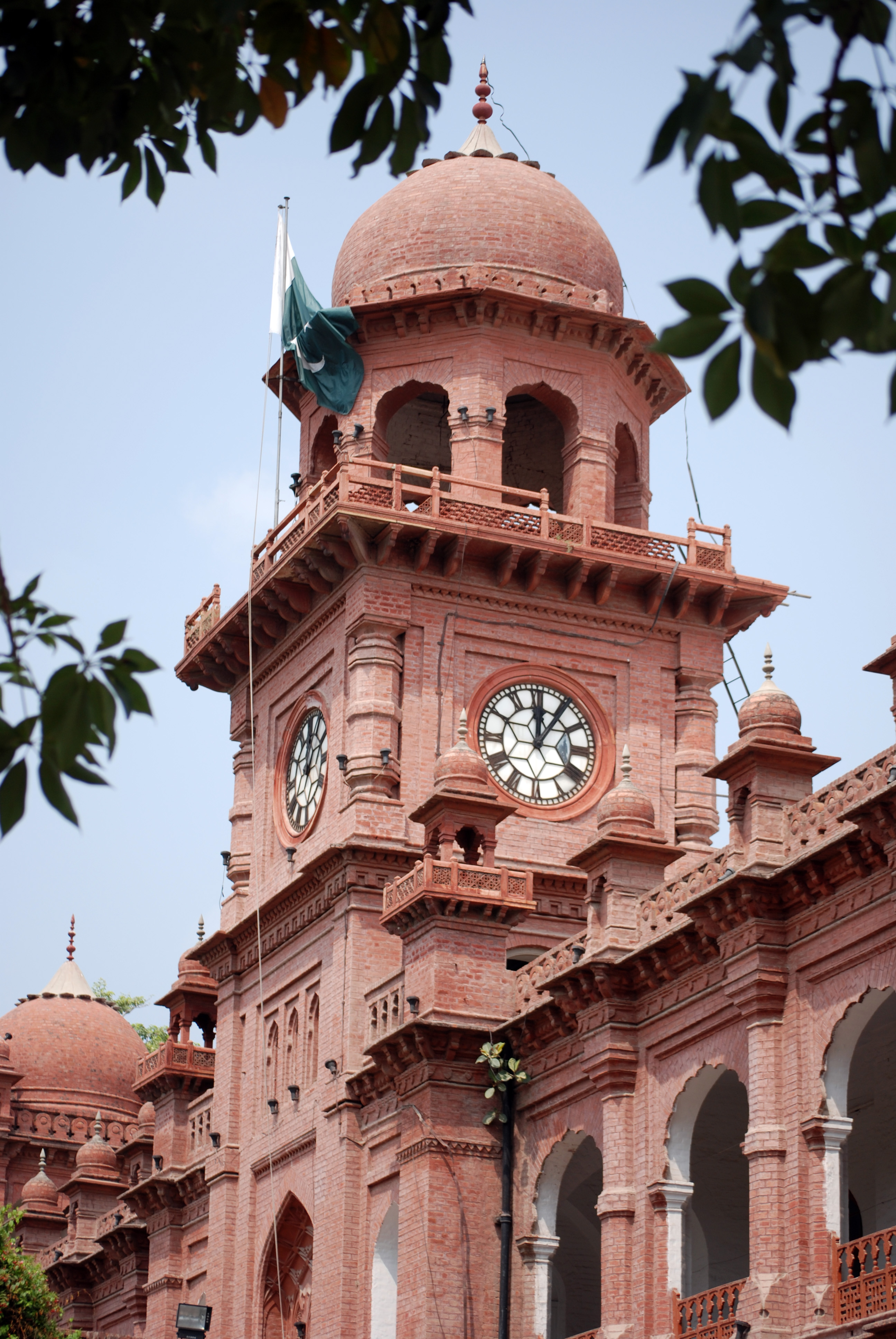
University of the Punjab, Old Campus

Lahore is sometimes considered Pakistan's educational capital, with more colleges and universities than any other city in Pakistan. The literacy rate of Lahore is 74%. The city is Pakistan's largest producer of professionals in the fields of science, technology, IT, law, engineering, medicine, nuclear sciences, pharmacology, telecommunication, biotechnology, microelectronics, and nanotechnology, and has the only future hyper high-tech centre in Pakistan. Most of the reputable universities are public, but in recent years there has also been an upsurge in the number of private universities. Lahore University of Management Sciences (LUMS) is the only AACSB accredited business school in Pakistan. Lahore hosts some of Pakistan's oldest and best educational institutes, including:

- Aitchison College, established in 1886
- Beaconhouse National University, established in 2003
- Central Model School, established in 1883
- Crescent Model Higher Secondary School, established in 1968
- College of Home Economics, established in 1955
- College of Statistical and Actuarial Sciences, established in 1950
- Convent of Jesus and Mary, established in 1867
- Dayal Singh College, established in 1910
- De'Montmorency College of Dentistry, established in 1929
- Fatima Jinnah Medical University, established in 1948
- Forman Christian College, established in 1864
- Government College University, Lahore, established in 1864
- Hailey College of Commerce, established in 1927
- Islamia College, established in 1892
- Jamia Ashrafia, established in 1947
- King Edward Medical University, established in 1860
- Kinnaird College for Women University, established in 1913
- Lady Maclagan Training College, established in 1933
- Lady Willingdon Nursing School, established in 1933
- Lahore College for Women University, established in 1922
- Lahore Garrison University
- Lahore Grammar School, established in 1979
- Lahore Medical and Dental College, established in 1997
- Lahore School of Economics, established in 1993
- Lahore University of Management Sciences, established in 1986
- M.A.O College, established in 1933
- Muslim Model High School, established in 1890
- National College of Arts, established in 1875
- Oriental College, established in 1876
- Pakistan Institute of Fashion and Design, established in 1994
- PakTurk International Schools and Colleges, established in 2006
- Queen Mary College, established in 1908
- Sacred Heart High School, established in 1906
- Shaikh Khalifa Bin Zayed Al-Nahyan Medical and Dental College, established in 2009
- St. Anthony's High School, established in 1892
- St. Francis High School, established in 1842
- University College of Pharmacy, established in 1944
- University Law College, established in 1868
- University of Central Punjab, established in 2002
- University of Education, established in 2002
- University of Engineering and Technology, Lahore, established in 1921
- University of Health Sciences, Lahore, established in 2002
- University of Lahore, established in 1999
- University of Management and Technology (Lahore), established in 2002
- University of the Punjab, established in 1882
- University of Veterinary and Animal Sciences, established in 1882

== Sports ==
Sports venues

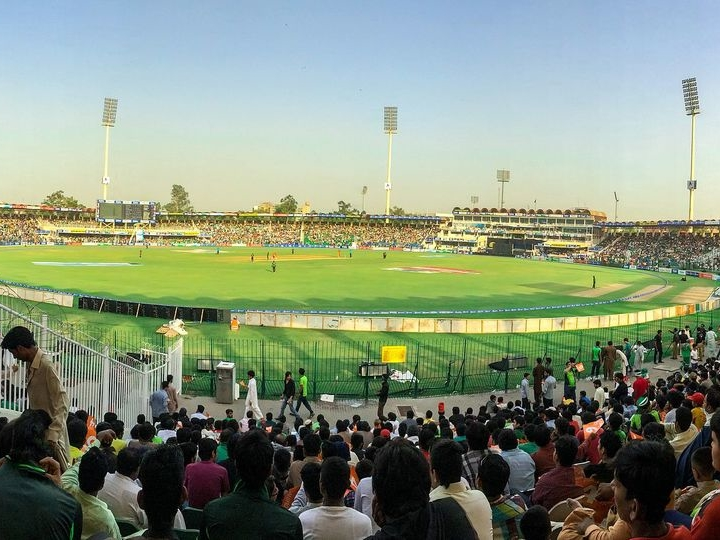
Gaddafi Stadium is one of the largest stadiums of Pakistan, with a capacity of 27,000 spectators.

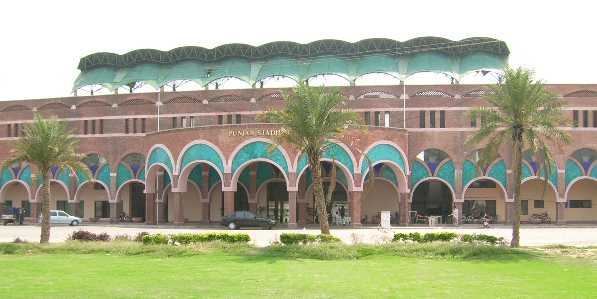
Punjab Stadium

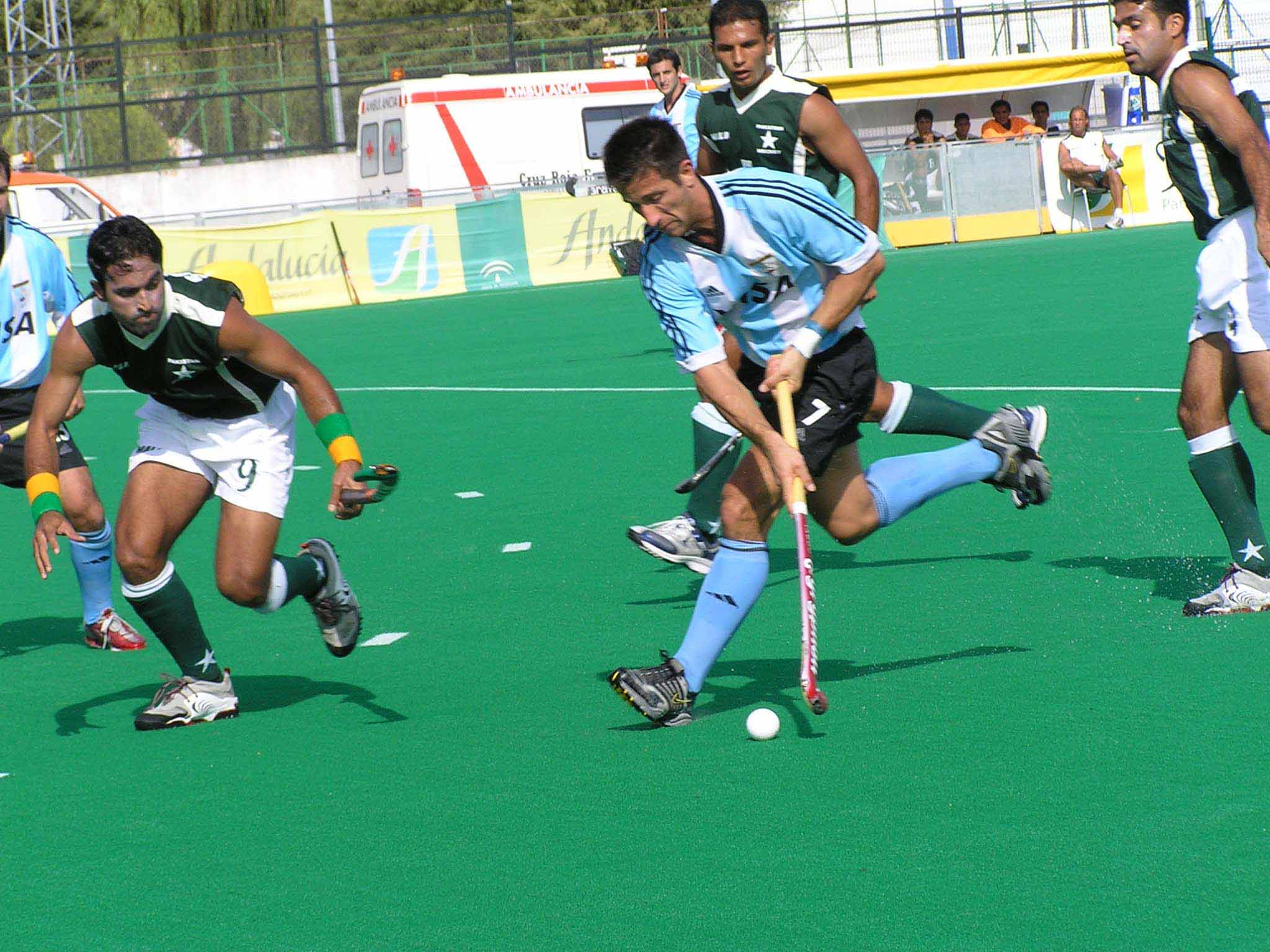
Pakistan playing against Argentina in 2005

Lahore has successfully hosted many international sports events, including the finals of the 1990 Men's Hockey World Cup and the 1996 Cricket World Cup. The headquarters of all major sports governing bodies in Pakistan are located in Lahore, including cricket, hockey, rugby, and football. Lahore is also home to the head office of the Pakistan Olympic Association.

Gaddafi Stadium is a Test cricket ground in Lahore. It was completed in 1959, and renovations were carried out by Pakistani architect Nayyar Ali Dada in the 1990s.

The multi purpose Punjab Stadium located near the headquarters of the Pakistan Football Federation, is mainly used for football matches and has hosted several events including AFC President's Cup and FIFA World Cup qualifiers. Wohaib club from Lahore was one of the leading football clubs in Pakistan in the 1990s.

Lahore also had its own football league, the Lahore District Football League, in which local teams would participate.

Lahore is home to several golf courses, including the Lahore Gymkhana Golf Course, the Lahore Garrison Golf and Country Club, the Royal Palm Golf Club, and newly built Defence Raya Golf & Country Club. Lake City, a 9-hole course, opened in nearby Raiwind Road in 2011. The newly opened Oasis Golf and Aqua Resort is a state-of-the-art resort, featuring golf, water parks, and leisure activities like horse riding and archery.

The Lahore Marathon is part of an annual package of six international marathons sponsored by Standard Chartered Bank across Asia, Africa, and the Middle East. More than 20,000 athletes from Pakistan and all over the world participate in this event. It was first held on 30 January 2005, and again on 29 January 2006. More than 22,000 people participated in the 2006 race. The third marathon was held on 14 January 2007. Plans exist to build Pakistan's first sports city in Lahore, on the bank of the Ravi River.

Professional sports teams from Lahore

Club	League	Sport	Venue	Established
Lahore Qalandars	Pakistan Super League	Cricket	Gaddafi Stadium	2015
Wohaib	PFF League	Football	Punjab University Old Campus Ground	1982

== Twin towns and sister cities ==
The following international cities have been declared twin towns and sister cities of Lahore.

- Istanbul, Turkey (1975)
- Sariwon, North Korea (1988)
- Xi'an, Shaanxi, China (1992)
- Kortrijk, Belgium (1993)
- Fez, Morocco (1994)
- Bukhara, Uzbekistan (1995)
- Samarkand, Uzbekistan (1995)
- Isfahan, Iran (2004)
- Mashad, Iran (2006)
- (United Kingdom) Glasgow, Scotland (2006)
- Chicago, Illinois, United States (2007)
- Belgrade, Serbia (2007)
- Kraków, Poland (2007)
- Coimbra, Portugal (2007)
- Dushanbe, Tajikistan (2008)
- Córdoba, Spain (2008)
- Bogotá, Colombia (2009)
- Amol, Iran (2010)
- Rio de Janeiro, Brazil (2015)

== Awards ==
In 1966, the Government of Pakistan awarded a special flag, the Hilal-i-istaqlal, to the cities of Lahore, Sargodha, and Sialkot for showing severe resistance to the enemy during the Indo-Pakistani War of 1965, as these cities were targets of the Indian aggression. Every year on Defence Day (6 September), this flag is hoisted in these cities in recognition of the will, courage, and perseverance of their people.

== See also ==
- Lahore Fashion Week
- Lahore Knowledge Park
- Lahore Literary Festival
- Lahore Railway Station
- Lahori chaddar
- Lahori cuisine
- Sikh period in Lahore
- Transport in Lahore
- Walled City of Lahore

=== Lists ===
- List of cemeteries in Lahore
- List of cities proper by population
- List of films set in Lahore
- List of hospitals in Lahore
- List of largest cities in Organisation of Islamic Cooperation member countries
- List of metropolitan areas in Asia
- List of people from Lahore
- List of streets in Lahore
- List of tallest buildings in Lahore
- List of towns in Lahore
- List of urban areas by population
