= List of cultural heritage sites in Lahore =

Following is the list of cultural heritage sites in Lahore, Punjab, Pakistan.

National Monuments, UNESCO inscribed and tentative sites

== Protected sites ==
Following is the list of sites protected by the Federal Government of Pakistan.

ID	Name	Type	Location	District	Coordinates	Image
PB-40	Akbari Sarai	Palace	Jehangir tomb complex, Shahdara Bagh	Lahore		Akbari Sarai More images Upload Photo
PB-41	Tomb of Ali Mardan Khan and gateway	Shrine	On Mughalpura Road (locally Vetman Road), near Railway Workshop	Lahore	31°20′33″N 74°12′53″E	Tomb of Ali Mardan Khan and gateway More images Upload Photo
PB-42	Anguri Bagh	Garden	opposite Shalimar Gardens, Baghbanpura	Lahore		Anguri Bagh More images Upload Photo
PB-43	Tomb of Asif Khan	Shrine	Shahdara	Lahore		Tomb of Asif Khan More images Upload Photo
PB-44	Badshahi Mosque (King’s Mosque)	Mosque/Landmark	Walled City	Lahore		Badshahi Mosque (King’s Mosque) More images Upload Photo
PB-45	Buddhu's Tomb (Buddhu Ka Awa)	Shrine	G.T. Road, Near University of Engineering & Technology	Lahore		Buddhu's Tomb (Buddhu Ka Awa) More images Upload Photo
PB-46	Chauburji	Landmark	Mozang	Lahore		Chauburji More images Upload Photo
PB-47	Dai Anga Mosque	Mosque	in the Naulakha area, near the Sarvwala Maqbara and Lahore railway station	Lahore		Dai Anga Mosque More images Upload Photo
PB-48	Bhati Gate	Gate	Walled City	Lahore		Bhati Gate More images Upload Photo
PB-49	Chitta Gate	Gate	Chowk Wazir Khan, inside Delhi Gate, Walled City	Lahore		Chitta Gate More images Upload Photo
PB-50	Delhi Gate	Gate	Walled City	Lahore		Delhi Gate More images Upload Photo
PB-51	Kashmiri Gate	Gate	Walled City	Lahore		Kashmiri Gate More images Upload Photo
PB-52	Lahori Gate	Gate	Walled City	Lahore		Lahori Gate More images Upload Photo
PB-53	Roshnai Gate	Gate	Walled City	Lahore		Roshnai Gate More images Upload Photo
PB-54	Shairanwala Gate	Gate	Walled City	Lahore		Shairanwala Gate More images Upload Photo
PB-55	Taxali Gate	Gate	Walled City	Lahore		Taxali Gate More images Upload Photo
PB-56	Mochi Gate	Gate	Walled City	Lahore		Mochi Gate More images Upload Photo
PB-57	Masti Gate	Gate	Walled City	Lahore		Masti Gate More images Upload Photo
PB-58	Gulabi Bagh Gateway and tomb	Gate	Begumpura	Lahore	31°34′41″N 74°21′51″E	Gulabi Bagh Gateway and tomb More images Upload Photo
PB-59	Haveli of Nau Nihal Singh (now Victoria Girls High School)	Residential building (now school)	Kucha Nau Nihal Singh, inside Bhati Gate, Walled City	Lahore		Haveli of Nau Nihal Singh (now Victoria Girls High School) More images Upload Photo
PB-60	Hazuri Bagh	Garden	near the Lahore Fort and Badshahi Mosque, Walled City	Lahore		Hazuri Bagh More images Upload Photo
PB-61	Hazuri Bagh Baradari	Landmark	near the Lahore Fort and Badshahi Mosque, Walled City	Lahore		Hazuri Bagh Baradari More images Upload Photo
PB-62	Hujra Mir Mehdi (Janazegah)		Kot Khawaja Saeed	Lahore		Hujra Mir Mehdi (Janazegah) More images Upload Photo
PB-63	Inayat Bagh	Garden	opposite Shalimar Gardens, Baghbanpura	Lahore		Inayat Bagh More images Upload Photo
PB-64	Jahangir’s Tomb and compound	Shrine	Shahdara	Lahore		Jahangir’s Tomb and compound More images Upload Photo
PB-65	Tomb of Jani Khan	Shrine	Baghbanpura	Lahore		Tomb of Jani Khan More images Upload Photo
PB-66	Javed Manzil	Residential building/Museum	Allama Iqbal Rd, Garhi Shahu, Mayo Gardens	Lahore		Javed Manzil More images Upload Photo
PB-67	Lahore Fort complex (including Moti Masjid, Naulakha Pavilion, Sheesh Mahal and others)	Landmark	in Iqbal Park, Walled City	Lahore		Lahore Fort complex (including Moti Masjid, Naulakha Pavilion, Sheesh Mahal and others) More images Upload Photo
PB-68	Mosque of Mariyam Zamani Begum	Mosque	inside Masti Gate, Walled City	Lahore		Mosque of Mariyam Zamani Begum More images Upload Photo
PB-69	Baradari of Kamran Mirza	Landmark	Near River Ravi	Lahore		Baradari of Kamran Mirza More images Upload Photo
PB-70	Muhammad Iqbal’s Tomb	Shrine	In Hazuri Bagh, Walled City	Lahore		Muhammad Iqbal’s Tomb More images Upload Photo
PB-71	Muhammad Iqbal’s residence	Residential building/Museum	34-A, McLeod Road	Lahore		Upload Photo Upload Photo
PB-72	Tomb and Tank of Nadira Banu	Shrine	Mian Mir, Lahore Cantonment	Lahore		Tomb and Tank of Nadira Banu More images Upload Photo
PB-73	Minar-e-Pakistan	Landmark		Lahore		Minar-e-Pakistan More images Upload Photo
PB-74	Nawab Zakariya Khan’s Mosque	Mosque	Baghbanpura	Lahore		Nawab Zakariya Khan’s Mosque More images Upload Photo
PB-75	One Kos Minar	Monument	Garhi Shahu	Lahore	31°33′52″N 74°21′12″E	One Kos Minar More images Upload Photo
PB-76	Tomb of Qutb-ud-din Aibak	Shrine	Aibak Road, Anarkali	Lahore		Tomb of Qutb-ud-din Aibak More images Upload Photo
PB-77	Well of Dina Nath	Monument	Chowk Wazir Khan, Walled City	Lahore		Well of Dina Nath More images Upload Photo
PB-78	Samadhi of Bhai Wasti Ram	Shrine	Texali Gate near Lahore Fort, Walled City	Lahore		Upload Photo Upload Photo
PB-79	Samadhi of Ranjit Singh	Shrine	Iqbal Park	Lahore		Samadhi of Ranjit Singh More images Upload Photo
PB-80	Samadhi of Kharak Singh	Shrine	near Huzuri Bagh, Walled City	Lahore		Upload Photo Upload Photo
PB-81	Samadhi of Nau Nihal Singh	Shrine	near Huzuri Bagh, Walled City	Lahore		Upload Photo Upload Photo
PB-82	Samadhi and Baradari of Maharaja Sher Singh	Shrine		Lahore		Samadhi and Baradari of Maharaja Sher Singh More images Upload Photo
PB-83	Saru wala Maqbra (Cypress Tomb/Tomb of Sharf ul Nisa)	Shrine	Baghbanpura, near UET	Lahore	31°34′51″N 74°21′51″E	Saru wala Maqbra (Cypress Tomb/Tomb of Sharf ul Nisa) More images Upload Photo
PB-84	Shalimar Gardens	Garden/Landmark	Baghbanpura	Lahore		Shalimar Gardens More images Upload Photo
PB-85	Tiled gateway and two bastions	Monument	Nawankot	Lahore		Tiled gateway and two bastions More images Upload Photo
PB-86	Tomb of Anarkali	Shrine	Punjab Secretariat	Lahore		Tomb of Anarkali More images Upload Photo
PB-87	Tomb of French officer's daughter Marie Charlotte	Shrine	Kuri Bagh	Lahore		Tomb of French officer's daughter Marie Charlotte More images Upload Photo
PB-88	Tomb of Khawaja Sabir (Nawab Nusrat Khan)	Shrine	inside Railway Mechanical Workshop, Mughalpura	Lahore		Tomb of Khawaja Sabir (Nawab Nusrat Khan) More images Upload Photo
PB-89	Shrine of Mahabat Khan and boundary wall	Shrine	Baghbanpura	Lahore		Shrine of Mahabat Khan and boundary wall More images Upload Photo
PB-90	Tomb of Nawab Bahadur Khan	Shrine	Mughalpura near Railway crossing; B-II, South of railway carriage shop	Lahore		Tomb of Nawab Bahadur Khan More images Upload Photo
PB-91	Tomb of Nur Jahan	Shrine	Shahdara	Lahore		Tomb of Nur Jahan More images Upload Photo
PB-92	Tomb of Prince Parwaiz	Shrine	Kot Khawaja Saeed	Lahore		Tomb of Prince Parwaiz More images Upload Photo
PB-93	Islamic Summit Minar	Landmark	Punjab Assembly, Mall Road	Lahore		Islamic Summit Minar More images Upload Photo
PB-94	Lahore Museum	Museum/Landmark	The Mall	Lahore		Lahore Museum More images Upload Photo
PB-95	Tomb, House, and Mosque of Shaikh Musa Ahangar	Shrine	35 Ghiraghan Street, McLeod Road	Lahore		Upload Photo Upload Photo
PB-96	Tomb of Zeb-un-Nisa	Shrine	On Multan Road adjacent to Samanabad Morr, Nawan Kot	Lahore		Tomb of Zeb-un-Nisa More images Upload Photo
PB-97	Two Kos Minars	Monument	Minola, 6 miles (9.7 km) from Jallo	Lahore		Two Kos Minars More images Upload Photo
PB-98	Wazir Khan Baradari	Monument	old Anarkali behind Lahore Museum	Lahore		Wazir Khan Baradari More images Upload Photo
PB-99	Shahi Hammam (Wazir Khan's hammam)	Monument	Chowk Wazir Khan, inside Delhi Gate	Lahore		Shahi Hammam (Wazir Khan's hammam) More images Upload Photo
PB-100	Wazir Khan Mosque	Mosque/Landmark	Chowk Wazir Khan, inside Delhi Gate	Lahore		Wazir Khan Mosque More images Upload Photo
PB-101-A	Yakki Gate			Lahore		Yakki Gate More images Upload Photo
PB-102-A	Akbari Gate			Lahore		Akbari Gate More images Upload Photo
PB-103-A	Neevin Mosque			Lahore		Neevin Mosque More images Upload Photo
PB-104-A	Cucoo's Den			Lahore		Cucoo's Den More images Upload Photo
PB-105-A	Gali Surjan Singh			Lahore		Gali Surjan Singh More images Upload Photo
PB-106-A	Noori Manzil			Lahore		Noori Manzil More images Upload Photo

=== Special premises ===
ID	Name	Type	Location	District	Coordinates	Image
PB-P-55	Aitchison College	Educational institution	Mall Road	Lahore		Aitchison College More images Upload Photo
PB-P-56	State Guest House	Government building	Mall Road	Lahore		Upload Photo Upload Photo
PB-P-57	Lahore High Court Building	Educational institution	Shahra-e-Quaid-e-Azam	Lahore		Lahore High Court Building More images Upload Photo
PB-P-58	Punjab Assembly	Educational institution	Mall Road	Lahore		Punjab Assembly More images Upload Photo
PB-P-59	Masonic Temple	Temple	90 Mall Road	Lahore		Masonic Temple More images Upload Photo
PB-P-60	Ferozsons Building		Shahrah-e-Quaid-e-Azam	Lahore		Ferozsons Building More images Upload Photo
PB-P-61	Montgomery Hall (Quaid-e-Azam Library)	Museum	Bagh-e-Jinnah, Shahra-e-Quaid-e-Azam	Lahore		Montgomery Hall (Quaid-e-Azam Library) More images Upload Photo
PB-P-62	Chamba House (GOR Estate)	Government residential building	Lower Mall, Islampura	Lahore		Chamba House (GOR Estate) More images Upload Photo
PB-P-63	Civil Lines Police Station			Lahore		Upload Photo Upload Photo
PB-P-64	King Edward Medical University	Educational institution	Mayo Hospital Road, Anarkali	Lahore		King Edward Medical University More images Upload Photo
PB-P-65	Neela Gumbad Anarkali		Neela Gumbad	Lahore		Neela Gumbad Anarkali More images Upload Photo
PB-P-66	General Post Office		Mall Road	Lahore		General Post Office More images Upload Photo
PB-P-67	State Bank of Pakistan Building	Government building	Mall Road	Lahore		State Bank of Pakistan Building More images Upload Photo
PB-P-68	Taj Palace		Opp. Services Hospital, Jail Road	Lahore		Taj Palace More images Upload Photo
PB-P-69	Barkat Ali Hall		Circular Road	Lahore		Upload Photo Upload Photo
PB-P-70	Punjab University	Educational institution		Lahore		Punjab University More images Upload Photo
PB-P-71	National College of Arts	Educational institution	Shahrah-e-Qauid-e-Azam, Mall Road	Lahore		National College of Arts More images Upload Photo
PB-P-72	Lahore Town Hall	Government building	Shahrah-e-Qauid-e-Azam, Mall Road	Lahore		Lahore Town Hall More images Upload Photo
PB-P-73	Lakshmi Building		Mcleod Road/Nisbat Road	Lahore		Lakshmi Building More images Upload Photo
PB-P-74	Tomb of Malik Ayaz (Rang Mahal)	Shrine	Walled City	Lahore		Tomb of Malik Ayaz (Rang Mahal) More images Upload Photo
PB-P-75	Fateh Garh Garden	Garden	near Shalamar Garden	Lahore		Fateh Garh Garden More images Upload Photo
PB-P-76	Fakir Khana Museum	Museum	inside Bhati Gate, Hakiman Bazar	Lahore		Fakir Khana Museum More images Upload Photo
PB-P-77	Haveli Dhyan Singh	Residential building/Monument	Texali Gate	Lahore		Haveli Dhyan Singh More images Upload Photo
PB-P-78	Sheetla Mata Mandir	Temple	outside Shahalami Gate	Lahore		Sheetla Mata Mandir More images Upload Photo
PB-P-79	Bradlaugh Hall		Rattigan Road	Lahore		Upload Photo Upload Photo
PB-P-80	Lahore Junction railway station	Railway station	G.T. Road/Circular Road	Lahore		Lahore Junction railway station More images Upload Photo
PB-P-81	Government College	Educational institution	Mall Road	Lahore		Government College More images Upload Photo
PB-P-82	Islamia College	Educational institution	Sheikh Abdul Qadir Jillani Rd/Railway Road	Lahore		Islamia College More images Upload Photo
PB-P-83	University of Veterinary and Animal Sciences	Educational institution	Sheikh Abdul Qadir Jillani Road	Lahore		University of Veterinary and Animal Sciences More images Upload Photo
PB-P-84	Central Model High School	Educational institution	Lower Mall	Lahore		Central Model High School More images Upload Photo
PB-P-85	Mubarak Haveli	Residential building	Bhati Gate	Lahore		Mubarak Haveli More images Upload Photo
PB-P-86	Haveli Nawab Sahib	Residential building	Mochi Gate	Lahore		Upload Photo Upload Photo
PB-P-87	Lahore Gymkhana Club		Bagh-e-Jinnah, Upper Mall, Shahrah-e-Quaid-e-Azam	Lahore		Lahore Gymkhana Club More images Upload Photo
PB-P-88	Kinnaird College	Educational institution	Jail Road	Lahore		Kinnaird College More images Upload Photo
PB-P-89	Queen Marry College	Educational institution		Lahore		Queen Marry College More images Upload Photo
PB-P-90	Governor's House	Government building	Mall Road	Lahore		Governor's House More images Upload Photo
PB-P-91	Haveli Sheikh Rukandin	Residential building	Lohari Gate	Lahore		Upload Photo Upload Photo
PB-P-92	Gurudwara	Temple	D-Block, Model Town	Lahore		Gurudwara More images Upload Photo
PB-P-93	Chaubara of Chajju Bhagat		Anarkali Road near Mayo Hospital	Lahore		Chaubara of Chajju Bhagat More images Upload Photo
PB-P-94	Dyal Singh Trust Library		Nisbat Road	Lahore		Dyal Singh Trust Library More images Upload Photo
PB-P-95	National Management College	Educational institution	Mall Road	Lahore		Upload Photo Upload Photo
PB-P-96	Mian Shah Din Building		Sharah-e-Quaid-e-Azam	Lahore		Mian Shah Din Building More images Upload Photo
PB-P-97	Sunehri Masjid (The Golden Mosque)	Mosque	Kashmiri Bazaar	Lahore		Sunehri Masjid (The Golden Mosque) More images Upload Photo
PB-P-98	Shrine of Hazrat Abul Malali	Shrine		Lahore		Upload Photo Upload Photo
PB-P-99	Shrine of Hazrat Sakhi Shah Chan Charagh and attached mosque	Shrine		Lahore		Shrine of Hazrat Sakhi Shah Chan Charagh and attached mosque More images Upload Photo
PB-P-100	Shrine of Hazrat Aishan Sahib	Shrine		Lahore		Shrine of Hazrat Aishan Sahib More images Upload Photo
PB-P-101	Shrine of Hazrat Syed Miran Mauj Darya Bukhari	Shrine		Lahore		Shrine of Hazrat Syed Miran Mauj Darya Bukhari More images Upload Photo
PB-P-102	Shrine of Mian Wada	Shrine		Lahore		Upload Photo Upload Photo
PB-P-103	Shrine of Hazrat Sikandar Shah	Shrine		Lahore		Upload Photo Upload Photo
PB-P-104	Mosque of Muhammad Saleh Kamboh	Mosque	Mochi Gate, Walled City	Lahore		Mosque of Muhammad Saleh Kamboh More images Upload Photo
PB-P-105	Data Durbar Complex	Shrine	Jilani Road	Lahore		Data Durbar Complex More images Upload Photo
PB-P-106	Shrine of Hazrat Khwaja Behari and nearby mosque	Shrine		Lahore		Upload Photo Upload Photo
PB-P-107	Shrine of Hazrat Maddho Lal Hussain	Shrine		Lahore		Shrine of Hazrat Maddho Lal Hussain More images Upload Photo
PB-P-108	Shrine of Hazrat Miran Hussain Janjani	Shrine		Lahore		Shrine of Hazrat Miran Hussain Janjani More images Upload Photo
PB-P-109	Shrine of Hazrat Sabir Shah on the west of Badshahi Mosque	Shrine		Lahore		Shrine of Hazrat Sabir Shah on the west of Badshahi Mosque More images Upload Photo
PB-P-110	Shrine of Hazrat Pir Makki	Shrine		Lahore		Shrine of Hazrat Pir Makki More images Upload Photo
PB-P-111	Shrine of Bibi Pak Daman	Shrine		Lahore		Shrine of Bibi Pak Daman More images Upload Photo
PB-P-112	Tomb of Shah Jamal	Shrine		Lahore		Tomb of Shah Jamal More images Upload Photo
PB-P-113	Shrine of Hazrat Shah Badakhshi	Shrine		Lahore		Upload Photo Upload Photo
PB-P-114	Small mosque of Wazir Khan inside Taxali Gate (the mosque of ladies of Wazir Khan)	Mosque		Lahore		Small mosque of Wazir Khan inside Taxali Gate (the mosque of ladies of Wazir Khan) More images Upload Photo
PB-P-115	Shrine of Nawab Abdul Samadd Khan	Shrine		Lahore		Upload Photo Upload Photo
PB-P-116	Masjid Mai Lado	Mosque		Lahore		Masjid Mai Lado More images Upload Photo
PB-P-117	Shrine of Hazrat Shah Kamal	Shrine		Lahore		Shrine of Hazrat Shah Kamal More images Upload Photo
PB-P-118	Barkat Ali Islamia Hall			Lahore		Barkat Ali Islamia Hall More images Upload Photo
PB-P-119	Unchi Masjid	Mosque	Kucha Pir Shirazi	Lahore		Unchi Masjid More images Upload Photo
PB-P-120	Jamia Masjid Patolian	Mosque	Mandi Chowk, inside Lahori Gate	Lahore		Jamia Masjid Patolian More images Upload Photo
PB-P-121	Shrine and Mosque of Hazrat Syed Jan Muhammad Hazoori	Shrine		Lahore		Upload Photo Upload Photo
PB-P-122	Shrine of Hazrat Syed Maulvi Nizam-ud-Din	Shrine		Lahore		Upload Photo Upload Photo
PB-P-123	Shrine of Hazrat Sadar-ud-din Sadar Jahan	Shrine		Lahore		Upload Photo Upload Photo
PB-P-124	Mosque of Khawaja Ayaz	Mosque		Lahore		Mosque of Khawaja Ayaz More images Upload Photo
PB-P-125	Shrine of Rustam Shah Ghazi	Shrine		Lahore		Upload Photo Upload Photo
PB-P-126	Chinian Wali Masjid	Mosque		Lahore		Chinian Wali Masjid More images Upload Photo
PB-P-127	Masjid Maulvi Taj Din	Mosque		Lahore		Upload Photo Upload Photo
PB-P-128	Shrine of Hazrat Shah Ismail Gilani	Shrine		Lahore		Upload Photo Upload Photo
PB-P-129	Shrine of Khawaja Muhammad Saeed within on enclosure opposite Nila Gumbad	Shrine		Lahore		Upload Photo Upload Photo
PB-P-130	Shrine of Shah Sharflying on the north of Khawaja Muhammad Saeed's Tomb	Shrine		Lahore		Upload Photo Upload Photo
PB-P-131	Shrine of Hazrat Shah Muhammad Ismail Gilani	Shrine		Lahore		Upload Photo Upload Photo
PB-P-132	Shrine of Hazrat Shah Shams-ud-Din	Shrine		Lahore		Shrine of Hazrat Shah Shams-ud-Din More images Upload Photo
PB-P-133	Shrine and Garden of Mian Khan s/o Gald Ullah Khan, the Prime Minister of Shahjahan	Shrine		Lahore		Upload Photo Upload Photo
PB-P-134	The Mughal Garden	Garden	Fatehgarh	Lahore		The Mughal Garden More images Upload Photo
PB-P-135	The remaining entrance gate, mosque and baradari of the garden of Khawaja Ayaz, the former Governor of Lahore			Lahore		Upload Photo Upload Photo
PB-P-136	Shrine of Nawab Khan-i-Dauran Nusrat Jang Bahadur lying within the area of Railway Workshop	Shrine		Lahore		Upload Photo Upload Photo
PB-P-137	Shrine of Muhammad Saleh Kamboh	Shrine	St. Andrew's Church, Empress Road	Lahore		Shrine of Muhammad Saleh Kamboh More images Upload Photo
PB-P-138	Masjid Moran Tawaif (Masjid Moran Mai)	Mosque		Lahore		Masjid Moran Tawaif (Masjid Moran Mai) More images Upload Photo
PB-P-139	Shrine of Hazrat Imam Gamun	Shrine		Lahore		Upload Photo Upload Photo
PB-P-140	Shrine of Abdul Ghani between Shalamar Garden	Shrine		Lahore		Shrine of Abdul Ghani between Shalamar Garden More images Upload Photo
PB-P-141	Temple and tank of Bherron ka Than	Temple	Lehra	Lahore		Upload Photo Upload Photo
PB-P-142	Sir Ganga Ram's Samadhi	Shrine	Ravi Road, Karim Park	Lahore		Sir Ganga Ram's Samadhi More images Upload Photo
PB-P-143	Samadhi of Ghaju Bhagat	Shrine		Lahore		Upload Photo Upload Photo
PB-P-144	The enclosure and Grave of Mian Natha and his goat in the General Graveyard of Mian Mir	Shrine		Lahore		The enclosure and Grave of Mian Natha and his goat in the General Graveyard of Mian Mir More images Upload Photo
PB-P-145	The Grave of Mulla Hamid Gujar	Shrine		Lahore		Upload Photo Upload Photo
PB-P-146	Shah Chiragh Chambers		Aiwan–e-Auqaf	Lahore		Shah Chiragh Chambers More images Upload Photo
PB-P-147	Hayat House No. 14		Hall Road	Lahore		Hayat House No. 14 More images Upload Photo
PB-P-148	Nila Gumbad Mosque	Mosque	Nila Gumband Road	Lahore		Nila Gumbad Mosque More images Upload Photo
PB-P-149	Shrine of Hazrat Abdul Razzak Makki	Shrine	Nila Gumband Road	Lahore		Shrine of Hazrat Abdul Razzak Makki More images Upload Photo
PB-P-149-A	Tomb of Khan-e-Jahan Bahadur Zafar Jang Kokaltash	Tomb		Lahore		Tomb of Khan-e-Jahan Bahadur Zafar Jang Kokaltash More images Upload Photo
PB-P-150-A	Smadhi Jhinger Shah Suthra			Lahore		Smadhi Jhinger Shah Suthra More images Upload Photo

== Unprotected Sites ==
ID	Name	Type	Location	District	Coordinates	Image
PB-U-31	Alhamra Arts Council	Public building	Shahrah Quaid-e-Azam, Lahore	Lahore		Alhamra Arts Council More images Upload Photo
PB-U-32	PIA Planetarium, Lahore	Public building	Chubrji, Lahore	Lahore		Upload Photo Upload Photo
PB-U-33	Cathedral Church of the Resurrection	Church	The Mall, opposite the Lahore High Court, Lahore	Lahore		Cathedral Church of the Resurrection More images Upload Photo
PB-U-34	Sacred Heart Cathedral	Church	Lahore	Lahore		Sacred Heart Cathedral More images Upload Photo
PB-U-35	St. Andrew's Church (Railway Church)	Church	near the Lahore Railway Station, Lahore	Lahore		St. Andrew's Church (Railway Church) More images Upload Photo
PB-U-36	St. Anthony's Church	Church	Lahore	Lahore		St. Anthony's Church More images Upload Photo
PB-U-37	St. Joseph's Church	Church	Lahore	Lahore		Upload Photo Upload Photo
PB-U-38	Bait-ur-Raza (Shrine of Syed Hakim Ali Shah)	Shrine		Lahore		Bait-ur-Raza (Shrine of Syed Hakim Ali Shah) More images Upload Photo
PB-U-39	Gaddafi Stadium		Gaddafi Road, Lahore	Lahore		Gaddafi Stadium More images Upload Photo
PB-U-40	Gora Kabristan	Cemetery	Lahore	Lahore		Gora Kabristan More images Upload Photo
PB-U-63	Dai Anga Tomb	Tomb		Lahore		Dai Anga Tomb More images Upload Photo
PB-U-64	Shaheed Ganj Mosque	mosque		Lahore		Shaheed Ganj Mosque More images Upload Photo
PB-U-65	Buddhu's Brick-kiln	mosque		Lahore		Buddhu's Brick-kiln More images Upload Photo
PB-U-66	Kotwali Building	mosque		Lahore		Kotwali Building More images Upload Photo
PB-U-67	Tollington market	mosque	Mall Rd	Lahore		Tollington market More images Upload Photo == Walled City of Lahore ==
L-U-1	Haveli Shamsher Singh			Lahore		Haveli Shamsher Singh More images Upload Photo
L-U-2	Lal Haveli			Lahore		Lal Haveli More images Upload Photo
L-U-3	Shab Bhar Mosque			Lahore		Shab Bhar Mosque More images Upload Photo
L-U-4	Bangla Ayub Shah			Lahore		Bangla Ayub Shah More images Upload Photo
L-U-5	Dina Nath Haveli			Lahore		Dina Nath Haveli More images Upload Photo
L-U-6	Haveli Baijnath			Lahore		Haveli Baijnath More images Upload Photo
L-U-7	Gurudwara Arjun Ram			Lahore		Gurudwara Arjun Ram More images Upload Photo
L-U-8	Mullah Majeed Mosque			Lahore		Mullah Majeed Mosque More images Upload Photo
L-U-9	Pani Wala Talaab			Lahore		Pani Wala Talaab More images Upload Photo
L-U-10	Hari Chand Ka Temple		Anarkali Bazaar	Lahore		Upload Photo Upload Photo
