= F. S. Khairullah =

Christian educationist and writer (1914–1997)

Dr Frank Safiullah Khairullah
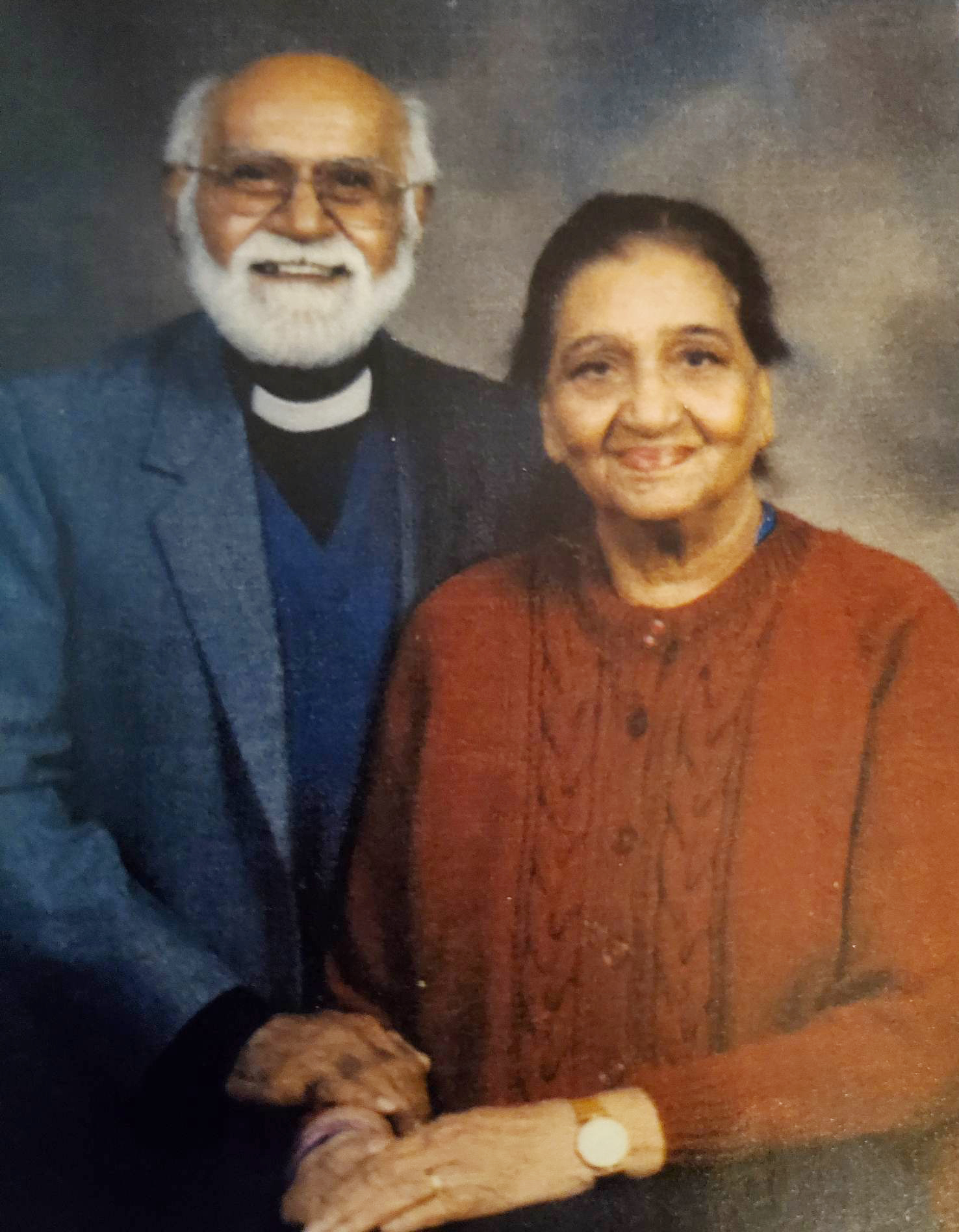
- Khairullah with his wife Ethel Khairullah
- Born: 11 October 1914; Nowshera, Khyber Pakhtunkhwa
- Died: 1997 (aged 82–83); Toronto, Canada
- Education: Doctor of Philosophy
- Alma mater: Forman Christian College; University of Edinburgh
- Occupations: Academic, writer
- Writing career
- Language: English, Greek, Hebrew, Hindi, Pashto, Urdu
- Subject: Protestantism
- Notable works: Qamus-ul-Kitab, Hebrew–Urdu primer

Frank Safiullah Khairullah was a Pakistani educationist and a Christian writer who served as the Presbyter of the Church of Pakistan.

== Early life and education ==
Khair Ullah was born in 1914 in Nowshera district in the family of Afghan converts to Christianity. His father, Khair Ullah, embraced Protestantism and worked for the Church Missionary Society. His mother was the daughter of an Afghan mullah, who helped in the translation of Psalms in Pushto following her conversion. His primary schooling took place at the Baring High School in Batala, India. He did his master's from the Forman Christian College in 1933. He earned a Doctor of Philosophy degree from the University of Edinburgh in 1954.

== Career ==
He served in the Indian Army as the secretary of Young Men's Christian Association during World War II in the Middle East. He joined the Murray College as a lecturer of English language in 1942 and then subsequently served as the Head of Department and the Principal of the college till 1972. He served as the director of the creative writing project at the Masihi Isha'at Khana in Lahore. During the course of his work, he wrote an Urdu Bible dictionary namely Qamus, which is regarded as his magnum opus. After retiring from the publishing house, he joined the Christian Foundation Seminars and published a Hebrew–Urdu primer in 1992. He was ordained a presbyter of the Church of Pakistan and appointed Vicar of the St. Andrew's Church, Lahore in the later years of his life. In 1994, he and his wife moved to Toronto, Canada to live with their daughter. He continued his work there as a writer and died in 1997.
