= Punjab Civil Secretariat =

- Interactive map of the Punjab Civil Secretariat area

General information
- Architectural style: Sikh Empire period architecture
- Location: Lower Mall Road, Islampura, Lahore, Punjab, Pakistan
- Coordinates: 31°32′55″N 74°19′26″E
- Year built: c. 1822 – 1839
- Groundbreaking: 1822 (commissioned)
- Completed: 1839 (residence)
- Opened: 1847: British Residency established
- Renovated: Early 2000s
- Owner: Government of Punjab, Pakistan

Technical details
- Material: Brick masonry with lime mortar
- Floor count: 2

Other information
- Public transit access: Lahore Metrobus: Civil Secretariat Station

Website
- punjab.gov.pk

The Punjab Civil Secretariat is the administrative headquarters of the Government of Punjab, Pakistan. Located in Lahore, the historic complex was originally constructed as the private residence of General Jean Baptiste Ventura, an officer in the Sikh Army of the Punjab. Over the last two centuries, the site has evolved from a military command center and private estate into the seat of colonial and post-independence bureaucracy.

== History ==
It was originally commissioned by General Jean Baptiste Ventura (born Giovanni Battista Ventura), an Italian national of Jewish descent and a veteran of Napoleon’s army at the Waterloo. After migrating to Lahore in 1822 via Istanbul and Persia, Ventura became a key figure in the court of Maharajah Ranjit Singh. As the Governor of Lahore, he played an instrumental role in modernizing the army through the creation of the Fauj-i-Khas (elite regiments).

The residence, originally known as Anarkali House, was constructed within the gardens surrounding the Tomb of Anarkali during the reign of Ranjit Singh. While the Punjab Gazetteer of 1916 cites an 1845 construction date, historical accounts suggest the structure was built earlier, prior to the Maharajah's death in 1839.

== Architecture and layout ==
=== Fauj-e-Khas headquarters ===
The original estate served a dual purpose as both a private residence and the headquarters for the Fauj-e-Khas. British intelligence accounts from the pre-1849 era describe a complex zoning layout: the northern wing housed the regimental headquarters, while the north-western sector contained extensive horse stables and staff residences. To the rear of the main building stood staff offices and a main kitchen located adjacent to the tomb. Originally demarcated by green hedges and French-officered guards, the perimeter was later fortified with a mud wall.

=== British Indian administration ===
Following the assassination of Maharajah Sher Singh in 1843, Ventura prepared to leave the region. The British Resident negotiated the purchase of the property, securing it for Rs 2,000 despite a demand of Rs 10,000. By 1847, the building functioned as the British Residency under Henry and John Lawrence. Upon the formal annexation of the Punjab in 1849, it became the residence for the Board of Administration, comprising Henry Lawrence, C.G. Mansel, and John Lawrence, and was expanded to house a British Company and infantry units. The site ceased its residential function in 1871, when it was formally designated as the Secretariat of the Government of Punjab.

=== Modern usage ===
The building currently houses the office of the Punjab Chief Secretary and related administrative departments. The interior features historical boards listing administrators from the East India Company-era to the present. The complex also houses the Punjab Archives and a major portion of its archives were moved from the "Record Office" to the historic horse stables in the early 2000s to create space for administrative meetings.

== Administration ==
The governance of the province has been directed from this building through several eras. The Board of Administration operated from 1849 until its abolition in 1853, after which John Lawrence served as Chief Commissioner. Following a reorganization in 1859, Richard Carnac Temple was appointed as the first Secretary to the Government of Punjab, followed by Robert Henry Davies. It was not until March 6, 1890, that C.L. Tupper was appointed as the first Chief Secretary of Punjab. This lineage of British administrators continued until August 14, 1947, when the administration transitioned to Pakistani officials.
