= Kuri Bagh Mausoleum =

- کوری باغ مقبرہ
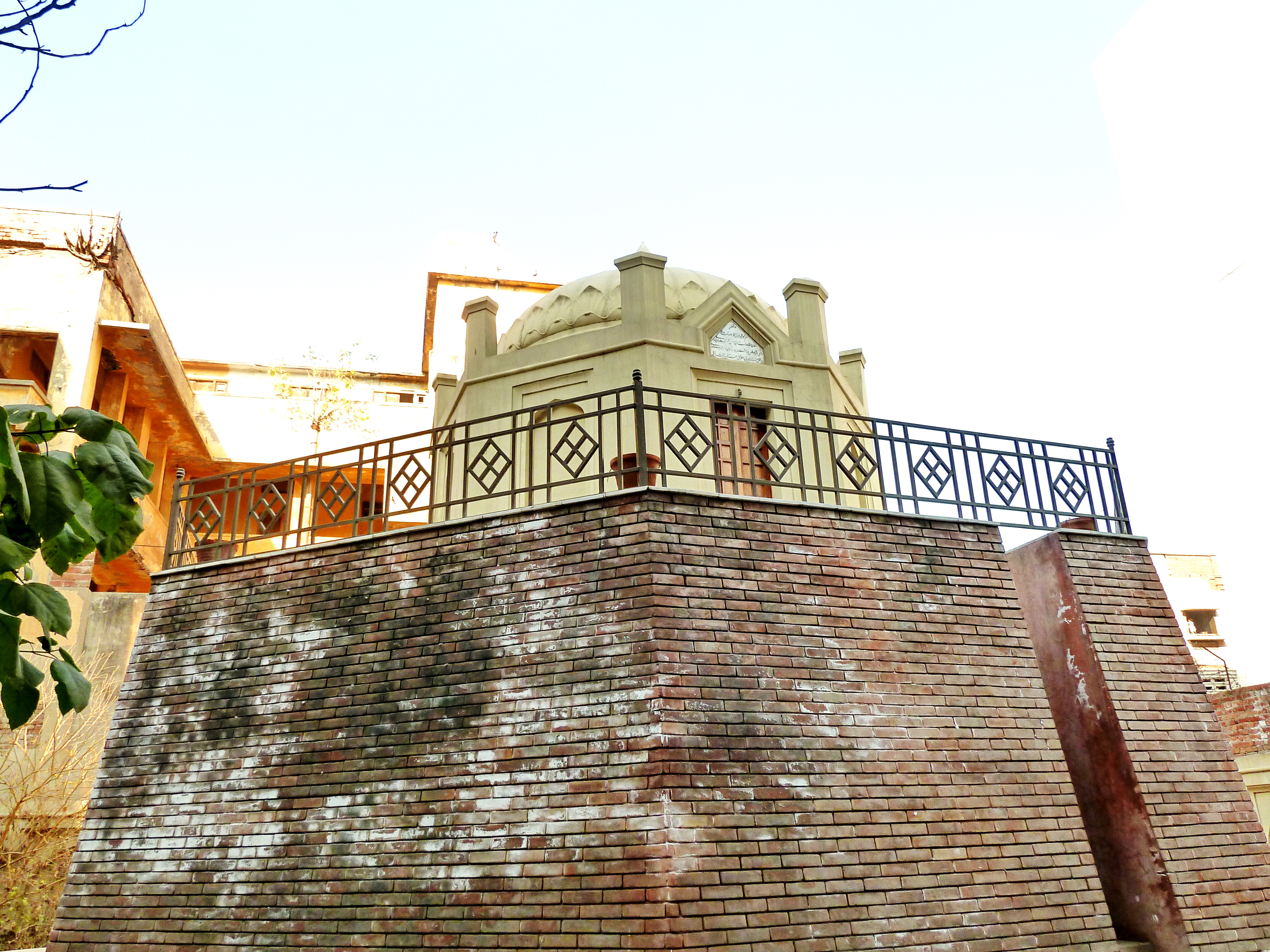
- Interactive map of Kuri Bagh Mausoleum
- Location: Lahore, Punjab, Pakistan
- Coordinates: 31°33′51″N 74°18′34″E
- Type: Mausoleum
- Material: Brick and lime mortar
- Beginning date: 1827
- Dedicated date: 1827
- Dedicated to: Jean-François Allard and Marie Charlotte Allard

Kuri Bagh Mausoleum (lit. 'The Daughter's Garden') is a historical mausoleum in Lahore that serves as the final resting place of General Jean-François Allard and his daughter, Marie Charlotte. The site derives its name from the garden attached to Allard's residence, where he originally commissioned the structure in 1827 to memorialize his daughter.

== Background ==
Jean-François Allard (1785–1839), a former Captain in Napoleon’s Old Guard, fled political purges in France and traversed Asia to arrive in Lahore in 1822, where Maharajah Ranjit Singh commissioned him to modernize the Sikh Army after an initial period of scrutiny. Tasked with countering the British East India Company, Allard established the Fauji-i-Khas, an elite cavalry force that grew to 6,000 men and uniquely fused Napoleonic traditions, using French commands and Imperial Eagle standards, with Sikh culture. Widely acclaimed as the "finest fighting force in Asia" and considered superior to British mounted troops, Allard’s cavalry served as the core of the Khalsa Army, leading critical campaigns including the pacification of Peshawar and Derajat (1825), operations against the Jihad of Sayyid Ahmad Barelvi (1827–1830), and the defense of the Anglo-Punjab border along the Sutlej River.

== Tomb ==
The mausoleum at Kuri Bagh was first constructed to house the remains of Allard's daughter, Marie Charlotte, who died on April 5, 1827. The tombstone bears a French inscription dedicating the structure to her and noting Allard's rank as a Chevalier of the Legion of Honour.

General Allard died of heart failure in Peshawar on January 23, 1839, while assisting General Avitabile in provincial administration. In accordance with his wishes, his body was transported to Lahore for burial. The funeral procession was a state event; salutes were fired at every station along the route, and the final leg from Shahdara to Anarkali was lined with troops firing minute guns. He was interred with full military honors beside his daughter on February 19, 1839. His wife, a relative of Maharajah Ranjit Singh, later relocated to France and is buried in Saint-Tropez.

== Academic work ==
In 2025, Nadhra Shahbaz Khan received the Ordre des Palmes académiques for her academic work on Kuri Bagh.
