= Chakrian =

Village in Gujrat District, Pakistan

Coordinates: 32.44838°N 73.882499°E

Chakrian is a village in union council Langay (near Mangowall) in Gujrat District of Pakistan. It is situated 23 kilometers west of the city of Gujrat.

== Demographics ==
The village has a population of around 5,000.

== History ==
The village was named after Sardar Chakar Singhan, a Sikh chieftain. In the 17th century, the Sufi saint Shah Sharif converted the residents of the village to Islam.

== Sports ==
Volleyball, cricket, Kabaddi and badminton are popular sports.

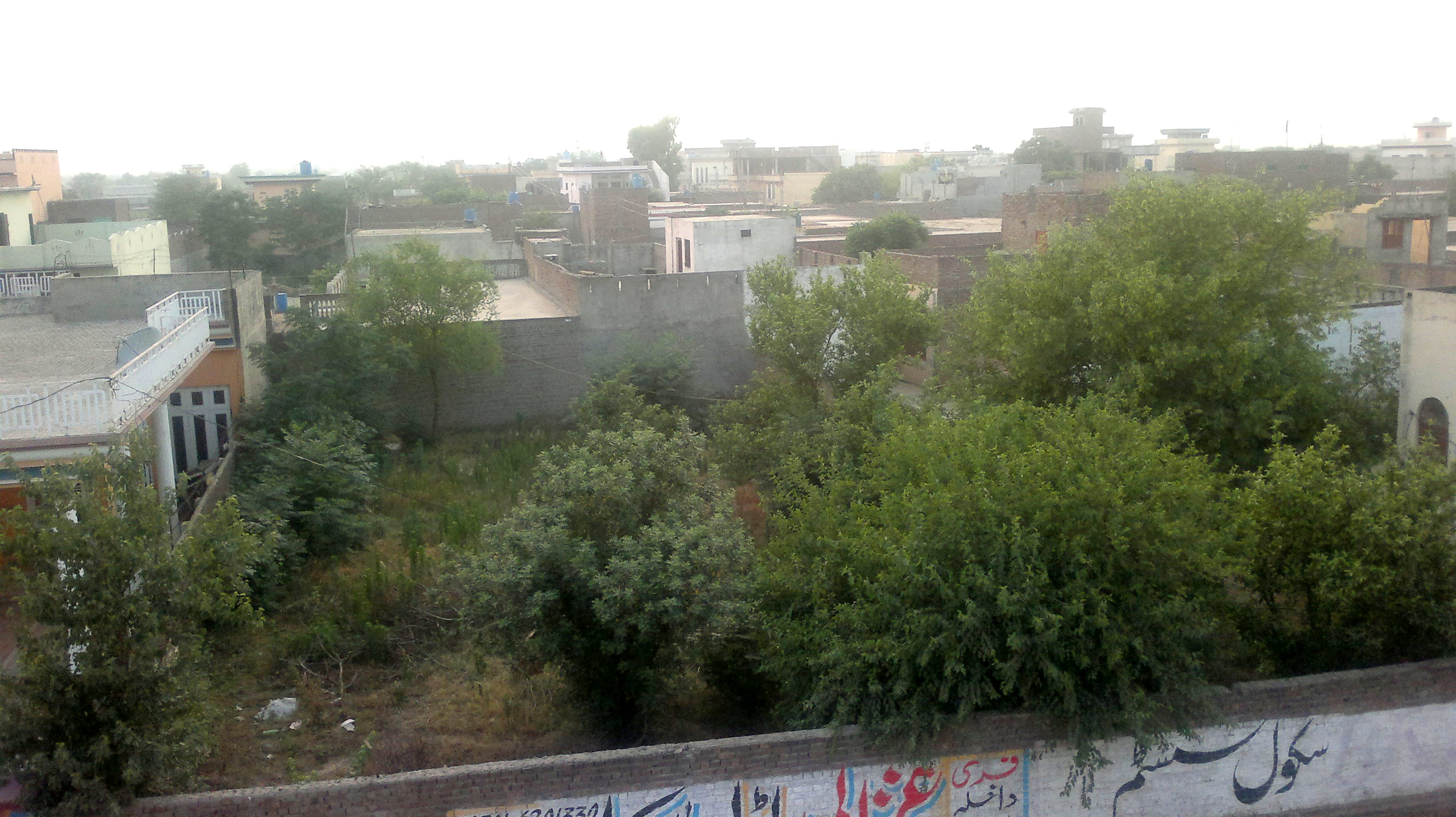
A view of Chakrian.

== Facilities ==
After a long wait, Chakrian now has access to gas, electricity, Internet and 3G/4G wireless communications.

== Education ==
The four schools in Chakrian are:

- Government elementary School Chakrian (for boys, ~400 students)
- Government Elementary School Chakrian (for girls, ~250 students)
- Quaid public model school (co-education, ~200 students)
- Shaan-e Pakistan Elementary school (co-education)

== Languages ==
The majority of inhabitants speak Punjabi. Other languages include Urdu, the national language of Pakistan and English.

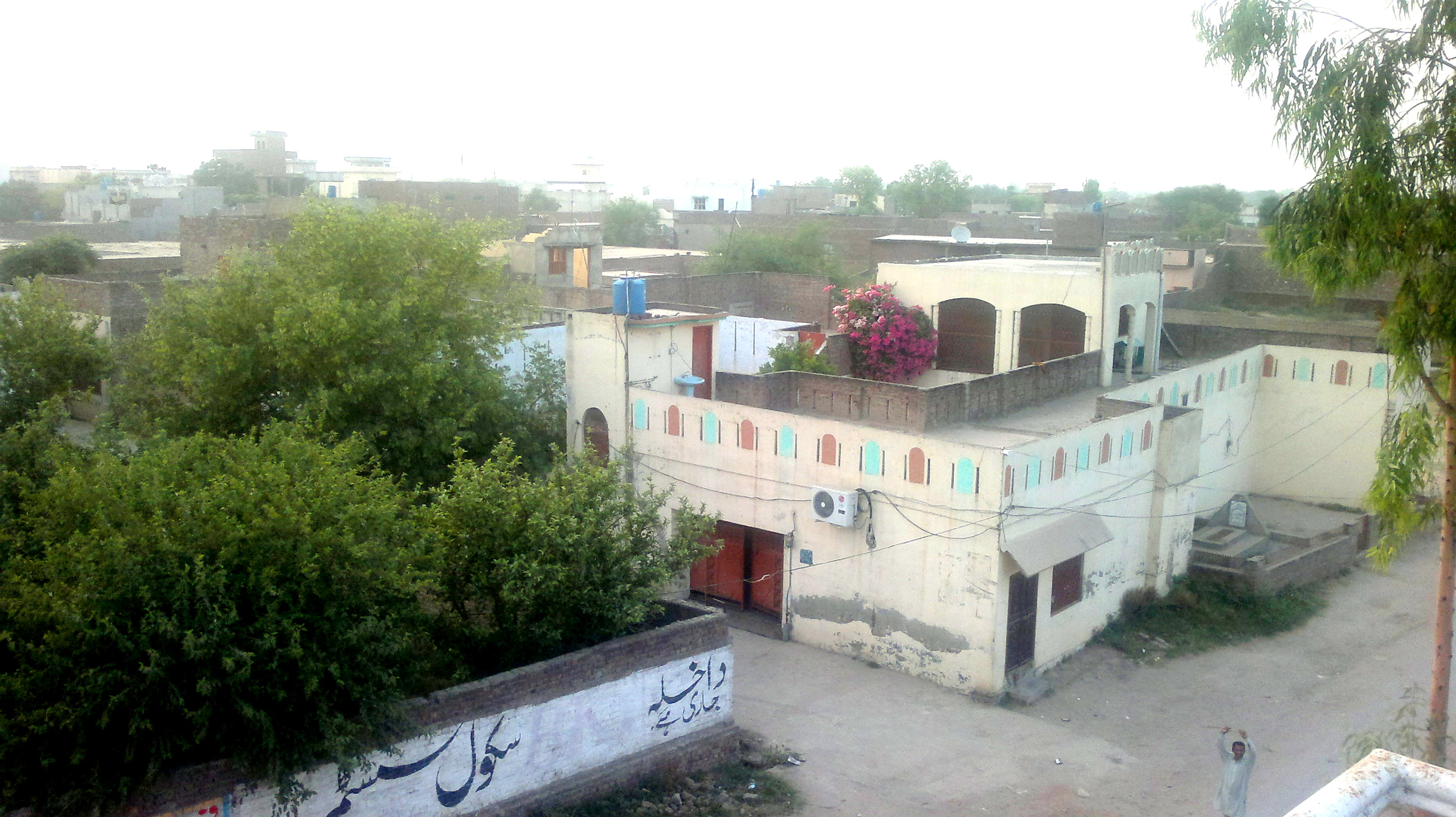
Another view of the village of Chakrian.

== Governance ==
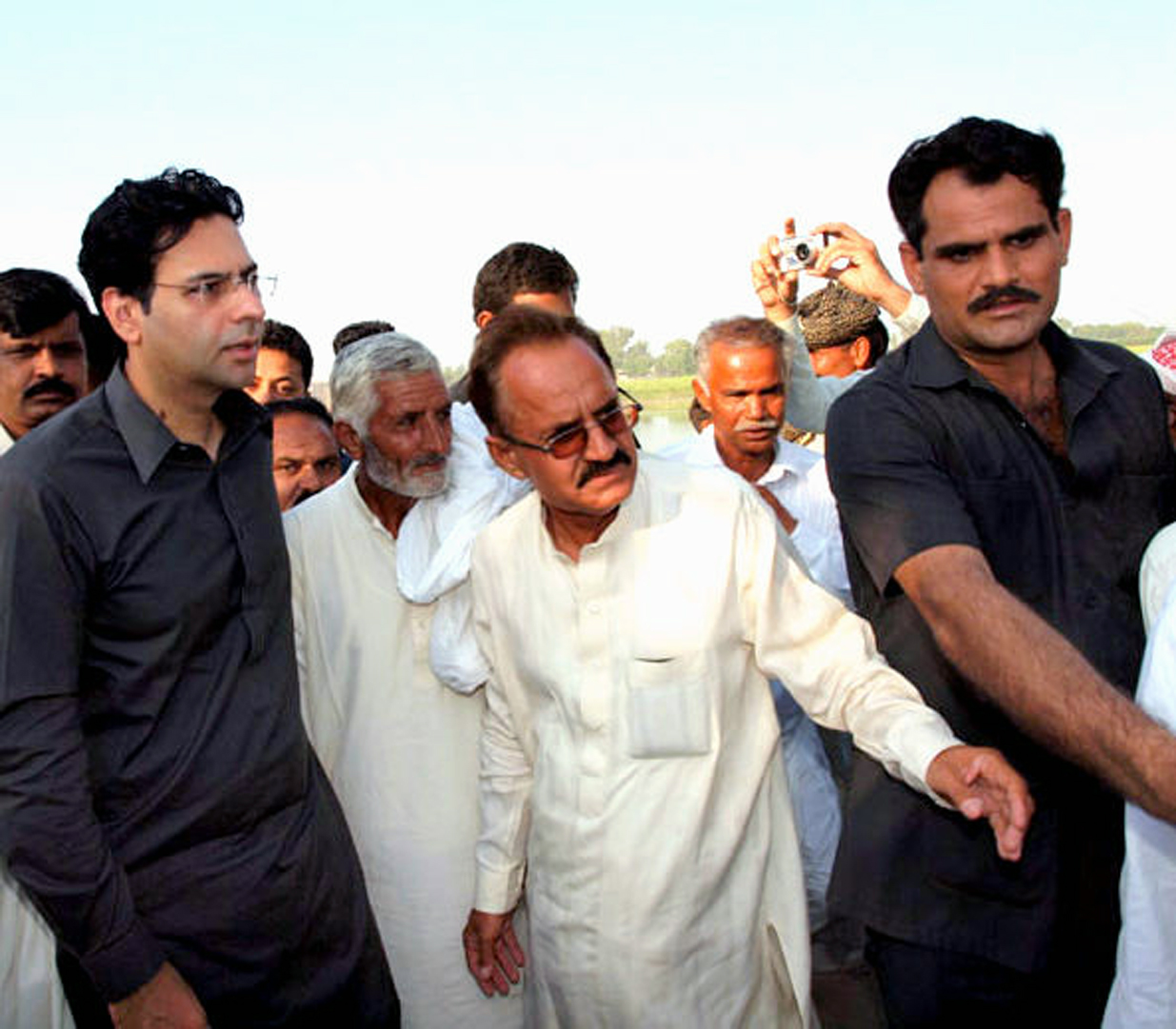
2013, Ch Moonis Elahi in Chakrian during inauguration of Sui Gas in neighbour village, Miana Kot

=== 2002 general election ===
During the 2002 elections, former Prime Minister of Pakistan Chaudhry Shujaat Hussain defeated Ahmad Mukhtar for NA-105 constituency. At village level, Chaudhry Shujaat Hussain won with a majority of 500 votes. For PP-110, former Chief Minister of Punjab Chaudhry Pervez Elahi won election. Chaudhry Pervez Elahi won with a majority of 400 votes at village level.

=== 2008 general election ===
In the 2008 general election, Ahmad Mukhtar won. In the Punjab Assembly, the village was represented by Chaudhry Moonis Elahi. At the village level (For NA-105), Ahmad Mukhtar received 641 votes and Chaudhry Shujaat Hussain received 459 votes. For PP-110. Nasir Mehmood, of People's Party, got 640 votes while Moonis Elahi could bag only 470 votes.

=== 2013 general election ===
In the 2013 general election, PMLQ representative Chaudhry Pervez Elahi won the constituency "NA105" by a margin of 15000 Votes. For PP-110, Moonis Elahi won by huge margin of 30000. At Village level PMLQ got a lead of 604 Votes over PMLN and PPPP. Former Law Minister Of Punjab, Raja Muhammad Basharat, also won previously from there. It remains in the consistency of Chaudhry Zahoor Elahi Shaheed.

Former Deputy Mayor of Union Council Langay belongs to Chakrian.

== Local politicians ==
Local representatives of political parties of Pakistan are as follows:

- PML-Q Chaudhry Talib Hussain, Former Mayor Of Union Council Langay.
- PML-Q Chaudry Nusrat Iqbal (Deputy Nazim) UC langay
- PML N Chaudhry Muhammad Asghar
- PPPP Chaudhry Ali Bahadur
- PML-Q Ch rang baz warraich urf Kalo warraich
