= Langay =

Langah لنگہ
- Location within Pakistan
- Coordinates: 32°26′40″N 73°54′41″E
- Country: Pakistan
- Province: Punjab
- District: Gujrat

Population
  - Total: About 7,000 (Approx).
- Time zone: UTC+5 (PST)
- Calling code: 0546
- Union council No: 13

Langay (لنگے) (official name; Langah لنگہ) is a village in Gujarat District in the Punjab province, Pakistan. According to 2017 Census of Pakistan, its population consists of 6,632 people.

== Description ==
Langay is (also known as Langah or Langa) a major village both in size and regional politics. It is a union council of Gujrat District. It is not far from Headworks Khanki on the Chenab River. Langay is located on the Samma road which runs almost parallel to Sargodha road connecting to the city of Gujrat. It is situated 22 km west of Gujrat city, 7 km south of Mungowal Gharbi. Nearby towns include, Asad Ullah Pur, Chakrian, Khojian Wali, and Goleki.

Village Langay comprises Langay itself, Nawan Lok, Ranjhian da Daira, Kot Miana and Kakay Chak. It is known as Langay Shareef, because of a darsgah named dars Mian Wada Sahib, named after Hazarat Mian Wada Sahib, which is a centre of religious learning, serving the people of the village for centuries.

== Education ==
There are three government schools including a Girls’ college; the Boys School's name is Govt Rizvia High School. There are also many private schools.

== Sports ==
Cricket is the main game of Langay village and Gujrat district Name Rizvia Cricket Club and Muneer Volleyball club Nawan Lok is the best volleyball team in Tehsil Gujrat.
