= Lahore Town Hall =

Civic government in Lahore, Pakistan

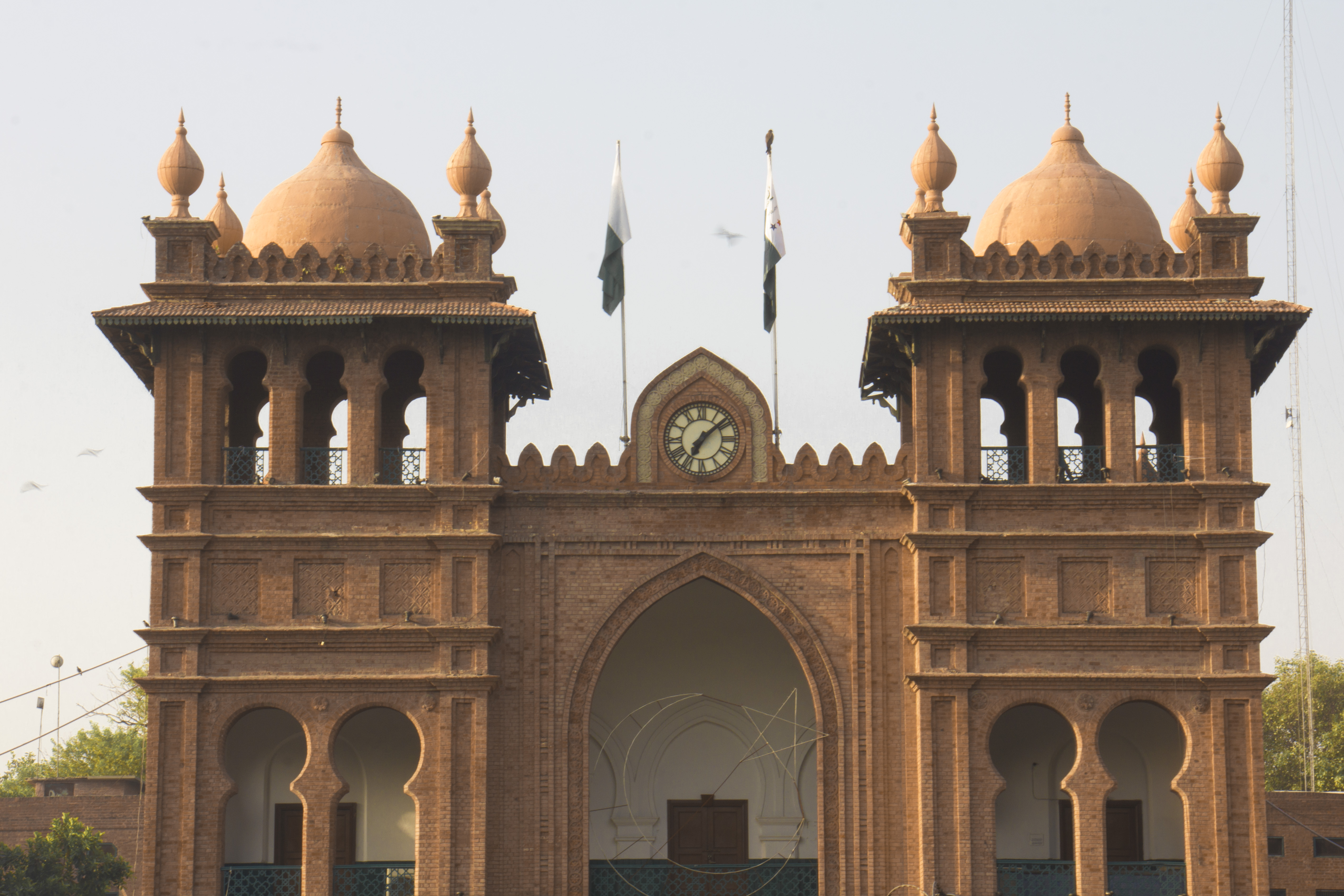
- Facade of Lahore Town Hall
- Former names: Victoria Jubilee Town Hall

General information
- Type: Town hall
- Architectural style: Indo-Saracenic architecture
- Location: The Mall, Lahore, Punjab, Pakistan
- Coordinates: 31°34′07″N 74°18′20″E
- Construction started: 1887
- Completed: 1890
- Opened: 3 February 1890
- Cost: Rs. 60,000
- Owner: Lahore Municipal Corporation

Technical details
- Floor count: 2

Design and construction
- Architect: Pogson

Lahore Town Hall, formerly known as Victoria Jubilee Town Hall is the seat for the civic government of the city of Lahore, Pakistan.

== History ==
It was built to honor the Golden Jubilee of Queen Victoria, and was originally called Victoria Jubilee Town Hall; the capstone was emplaced by Charles Umpherston Aitchison. Prince Albert Victor, Duke of Clarence and Avondale attended the 3 February 1890 opening celebration. The two story building was designed based on a winning entrant plan by a Chennai architect named Pogson. The structure has Mughal, Sultanate, and Spanish design elements, and sees a lancet arch flanked by corner towers ending in merlons. The total construction cost was Rs. 60,000.

== See also ==
- Architecture of Lahore
