= Buddhu's Tomb =

Tomb in Lahore, Pakistan

- بدهو کا مقبره
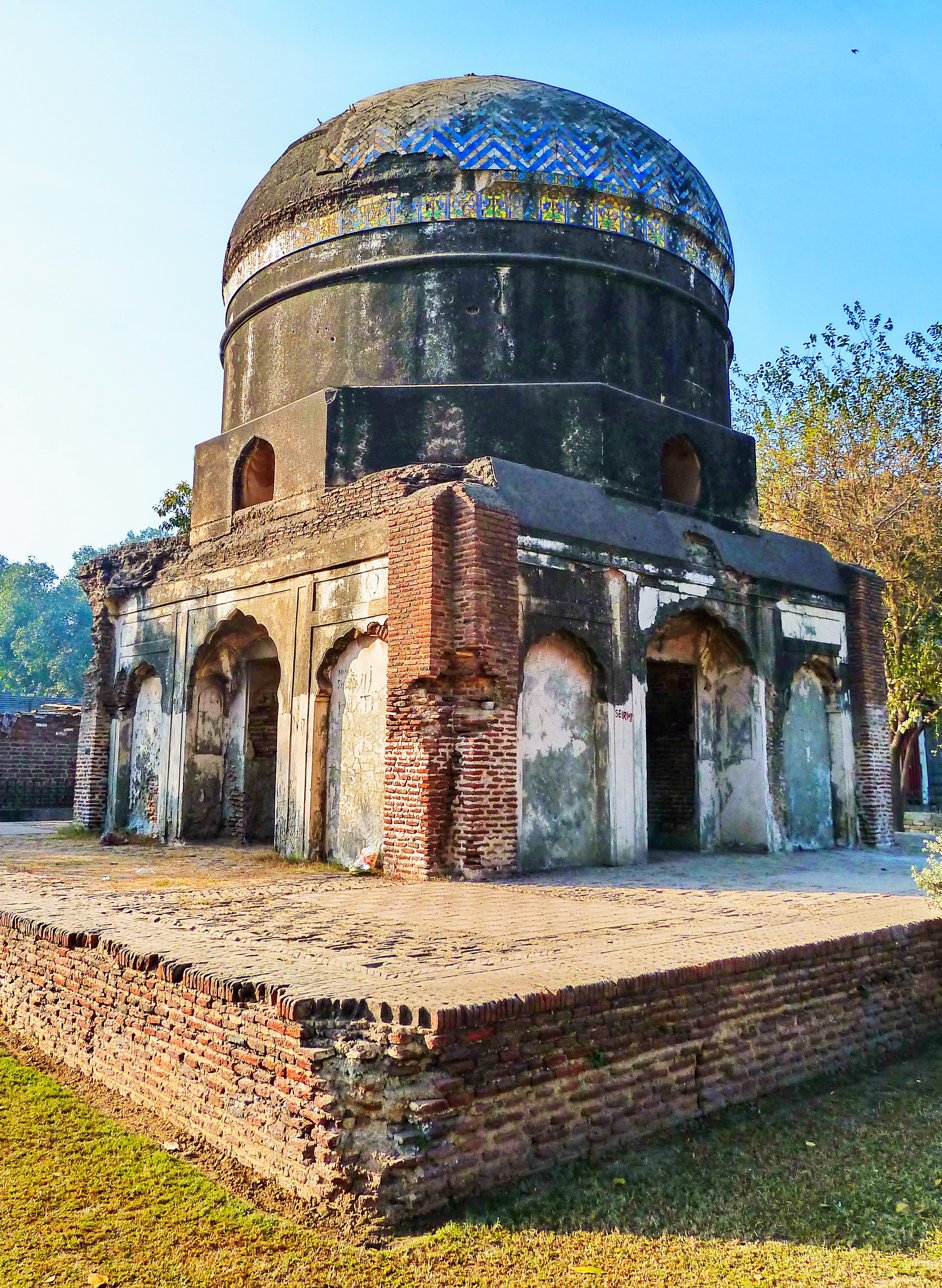
- Interactive map of Buddhu's Tomb
- Location: Lahore, Punjab, Pakistan
- Coordinates: 31.576160°N 74.355904°E
- Completion date: c. 1641 C.E.

Buddhu's Tomb (Urdu: بدهو کا مقبره; "Buddhū kā muqbara"), also known as Buddhu kā Āwā (Urdu: بدهو کا آوا; "Buddhu's kiln"), is a 17th-century tomb located in Lahore, Pakistan. The tomb is traditionally attributed to that of a Lahore resident named Buddhu, though some historians such as Syad Muhammad Latif suggest that the tomb was actually built for the wife of Khan-e-Dauran Bahadur Nusrat Jang. Some Sikhs regard the tomb to be a gurdwara built by Buddhu.

== Location ==
The tomb is located alongside the Grand Trunk Road, east of the Walled City of Lahore. The tomb is situated across the GT Road from the University of Engineering and Technology.

== History ==
The tomb was built around 1641, and is traditionally ascribed to be the tomb of Buddhu, son of Suddhu - a local brick maker who supplied bricks for several royal buildings in Lahore during the Shah Jahan period. Historical record suggests that the tomb was actually built for the wife of Khan-e-Dauran Bahadur Nusrat Jang - an amir of the Mughal royal court. The amir was himself later buried in it following his death in 1643.

In keeping with Mughal funerary tradition, the tomb was likely located in a garden which no longer survives. The site was used by Prince Sher Singh as his army's headquarters during his invasion of Lahore.

== Architecture ==
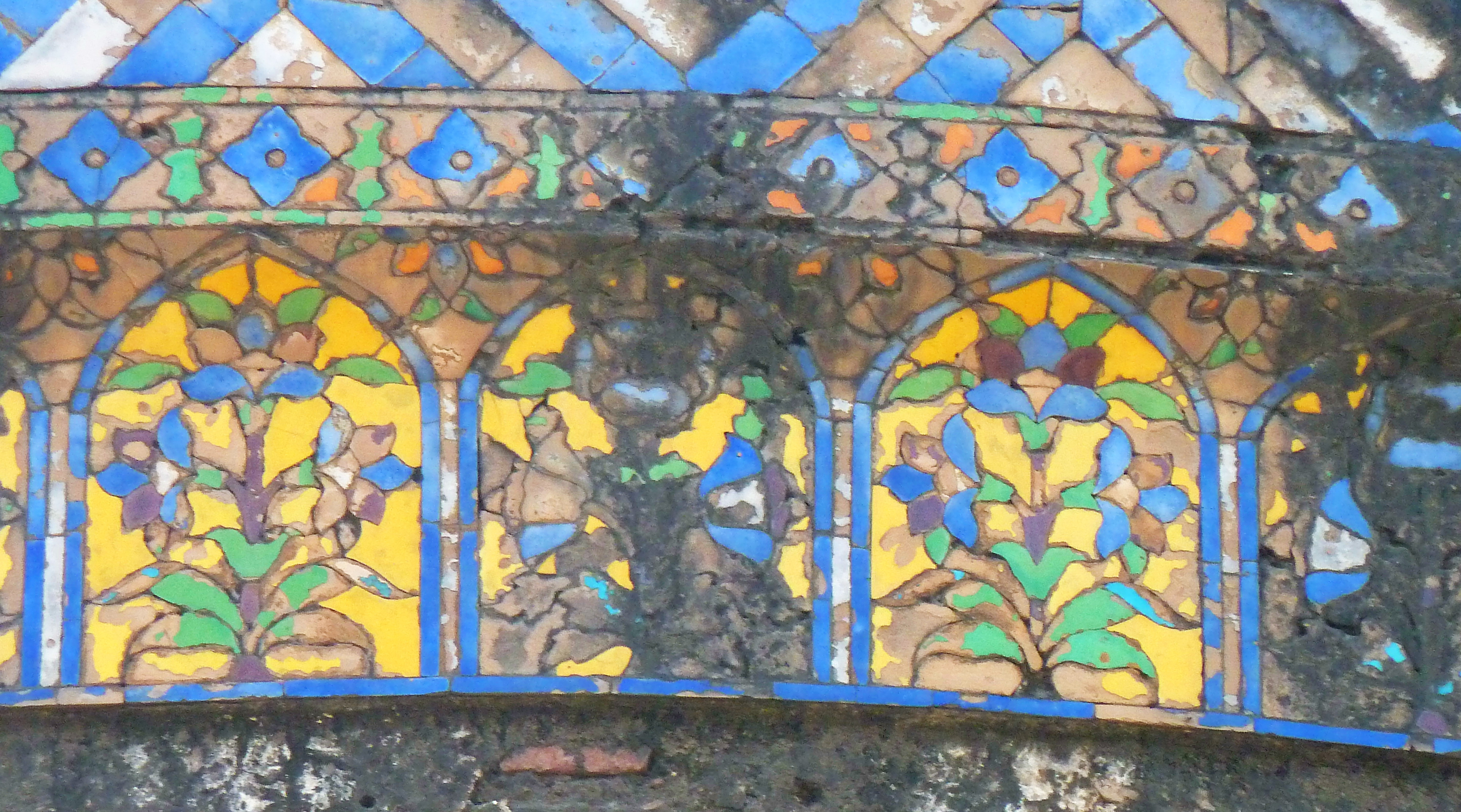
Some of the tomb's exterior tile-work survives

The base level of the tomb is square shaped, and has a doorway on each side. Each doorway is flanked by a small recessed arch. Atop the base is an octagonal layer upon which the tomb's prominent dome is placed, measuring 32 feet in diameter.

The tomb is decorated with glazed blue and yellow tile-work, laid primarily in floral designs. The tomb's dome is decorated with blue tile-work in a chevron pattern.

== Associated legend ==
The tomb has traditionally been said to be the brick-kiln of Buddhu. Buddhu's servants are said to have refused Abdul Haq, a disciple of Mian Mir, from warming himself at the brick kiln. Haq cursed the kiln, leading to its eventual decline. Buddhu was forced to atone for his sin, but the insult was considered so great that the kiln remained out of service thereafter.

A Sikh version of the legend asserts that Buddhu had refused to feed Bhai Kamliya, and was later cursed by him until Buddhu was able to repent to Guru Arjan before his business was restored. Sikhs assert that the tomb was actually built as part of a gurdwara.

== Conservation ==
The site is protected by the Antiquities Act 1975. The site was partially restored in 2014 by Dr. Abdul Rehman, with support from an alumni fund for Fulbright scholars, and The United States Educational Foundation in Pakistan.

=== Impact of Metro construction ===
The monument is situated along the planned route of the Orange Line of the Lahore Metro. Heritage campaigners submitted a petition to the Lahore High Court as the planned metro line will pass close to Buddhu's Tomb, the Shalimar Gardens, and nine other sites in the city in violation of the Punjab Special Premises Ordinance, 1985 and Antiquity Act, 1975.

== Gallery ==
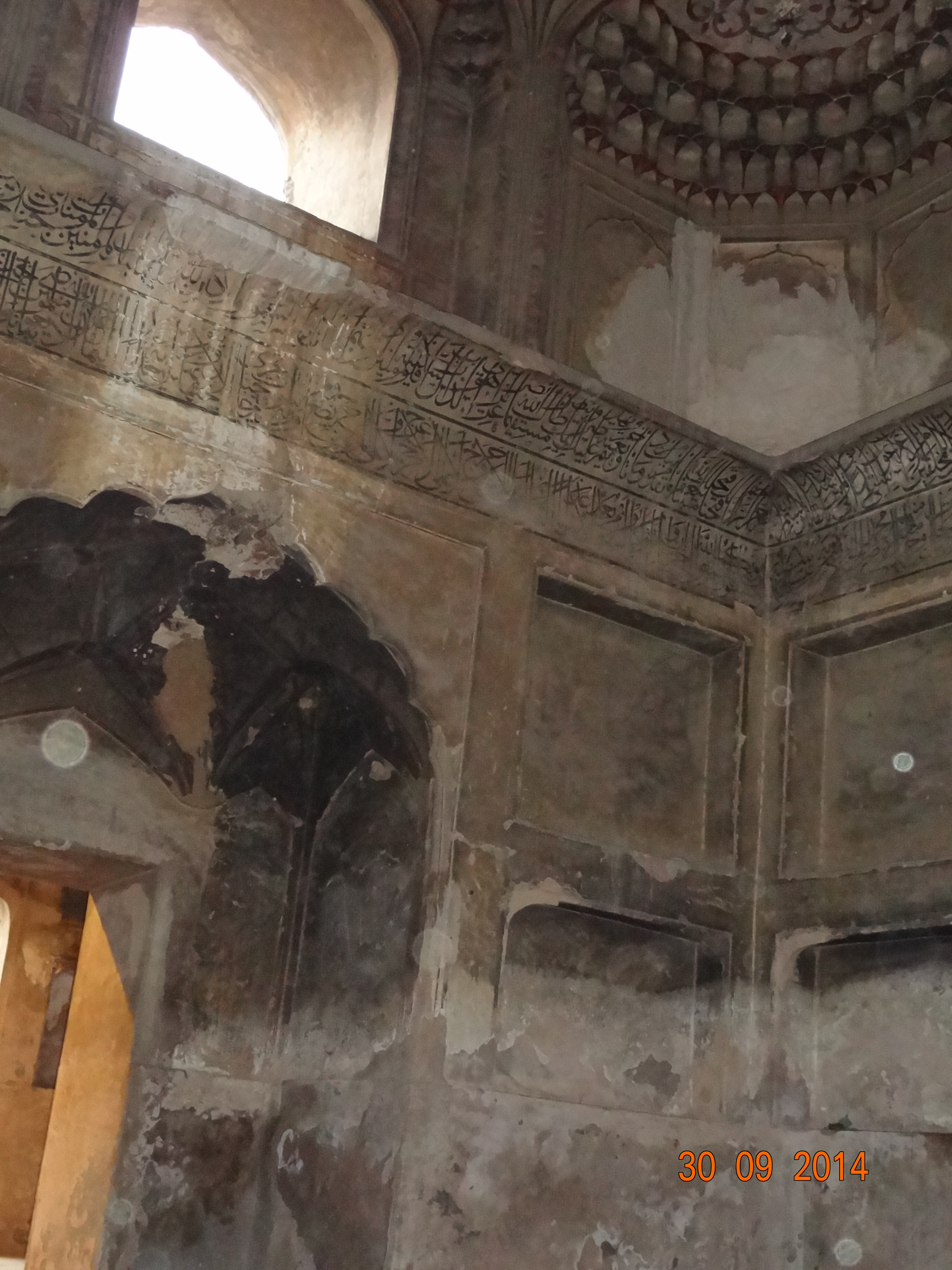
The tombs interior is decorated with calligraphy

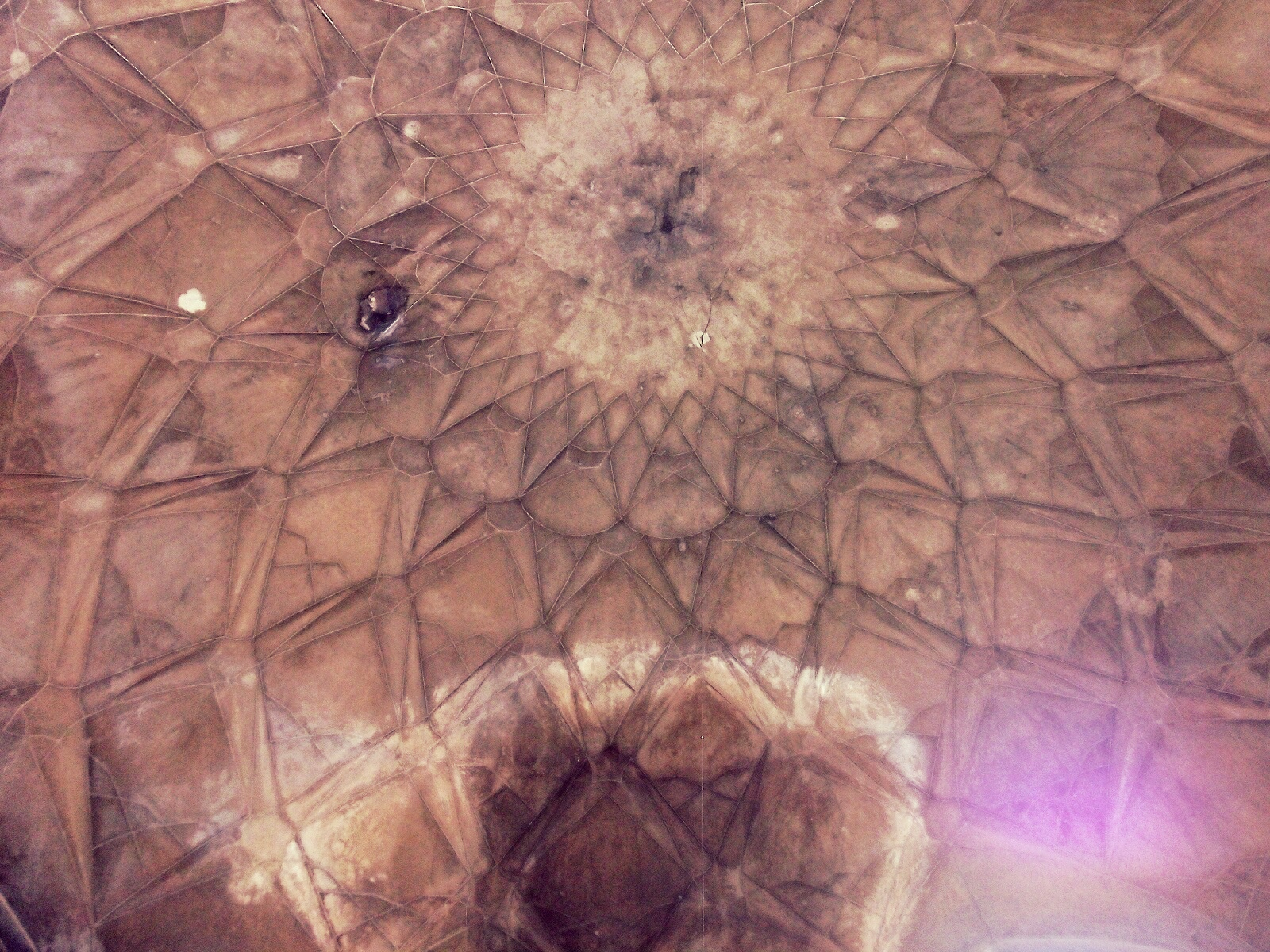
The underside of the tomb was decorated with ghalib kari to create a 3-dimensional pattern

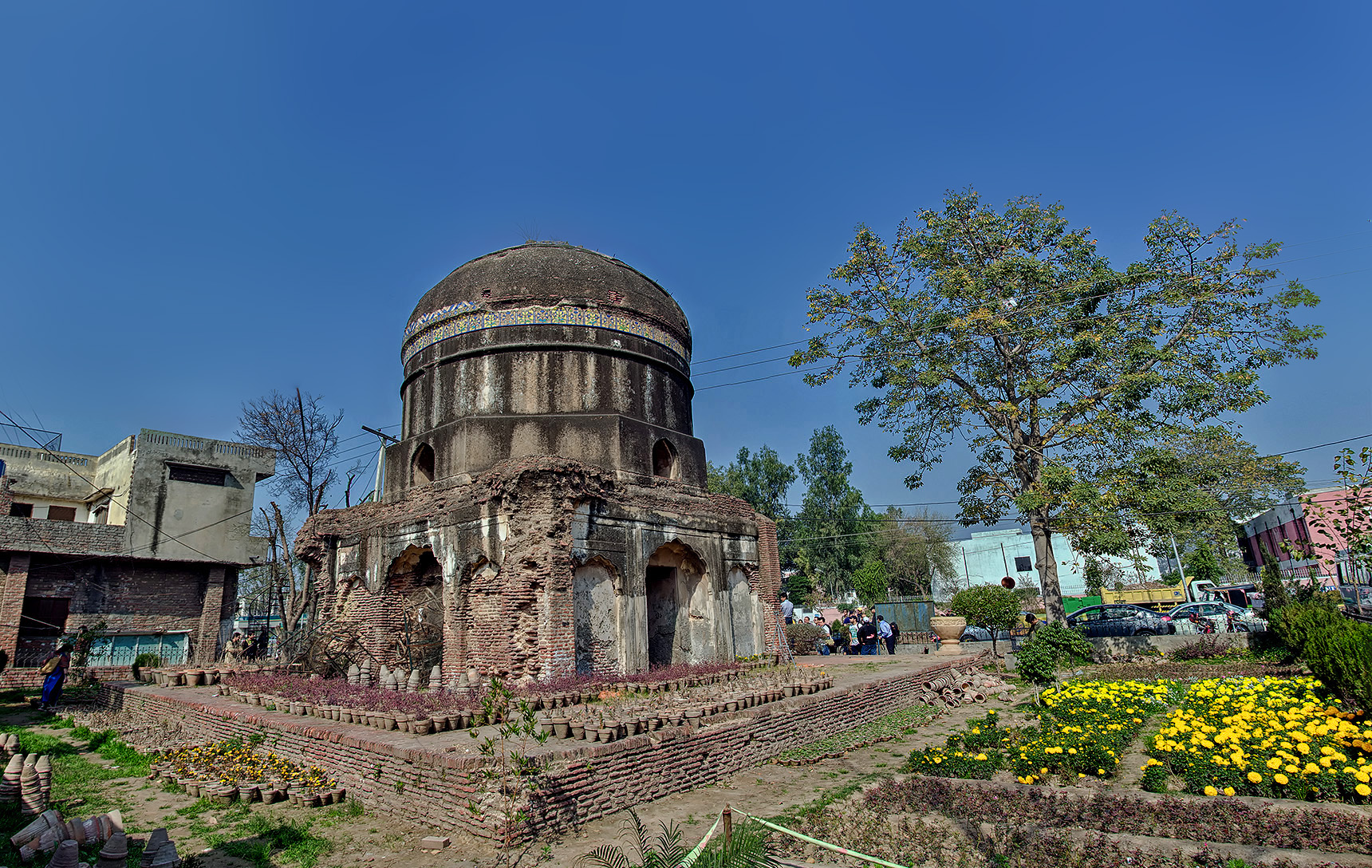
The tomb stands upon a small brick plinth
