= Tomb of Jani Khan =

Tomb of Jani Khan مقبرہ جانی خان
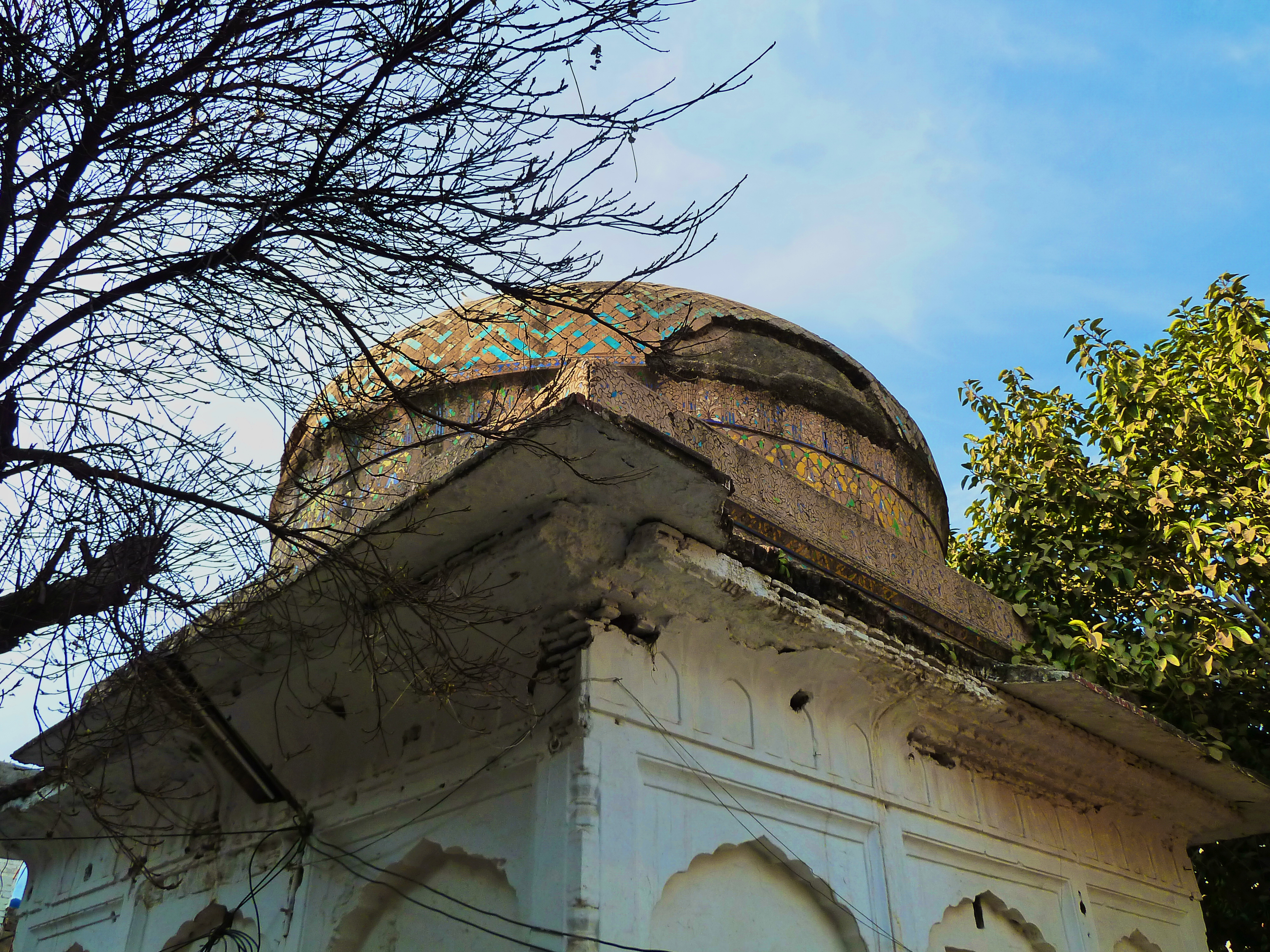
- The dome over Jani Khan's tomb, Lahore
- Interactive map of Tomb of Jani Khan مقبرہ جانی خان
- Location: Lahore, Punjab, Pakistan
- Coordinates: 31°34′54.64″N 74°22′13.72″E
- Architectural style: Mughal

Tomb of Jani Khan (Urdu: مقبرہ جانی خان), or Khan-i-Khanan (Urdu: خانِ خانان), is a historical tomb of Jani Khan. It is situated in Baghbanpura, Lahore, Punjab, Pakistan.

== History ==
The tomb was constructed during the Mughal rule in South Asia. Jani Khan was the father-in-law of Moin-ul-Mulk, the Mughal governor, who died in 1778. There are three graves inside the tomb. Kanhiya Lal in his book History of Lahore mentioned that he was the brother of Moin ul Mulk and had the title of Intizam-ud-Daulah. He was appointed as the commander in the Punjab Army and repelled the first invasion of Ahmad Shah Abdali.

== Gallery ==
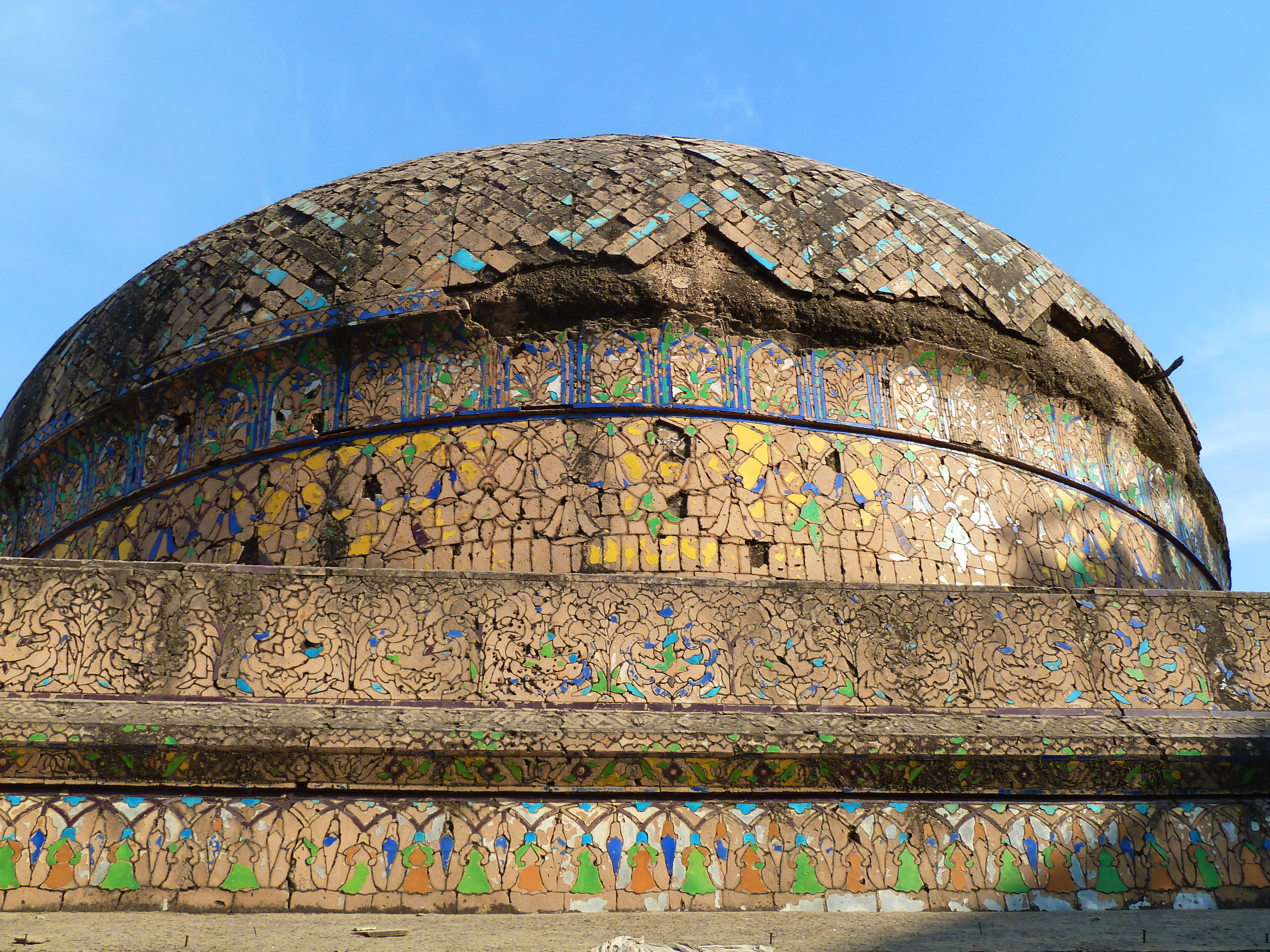

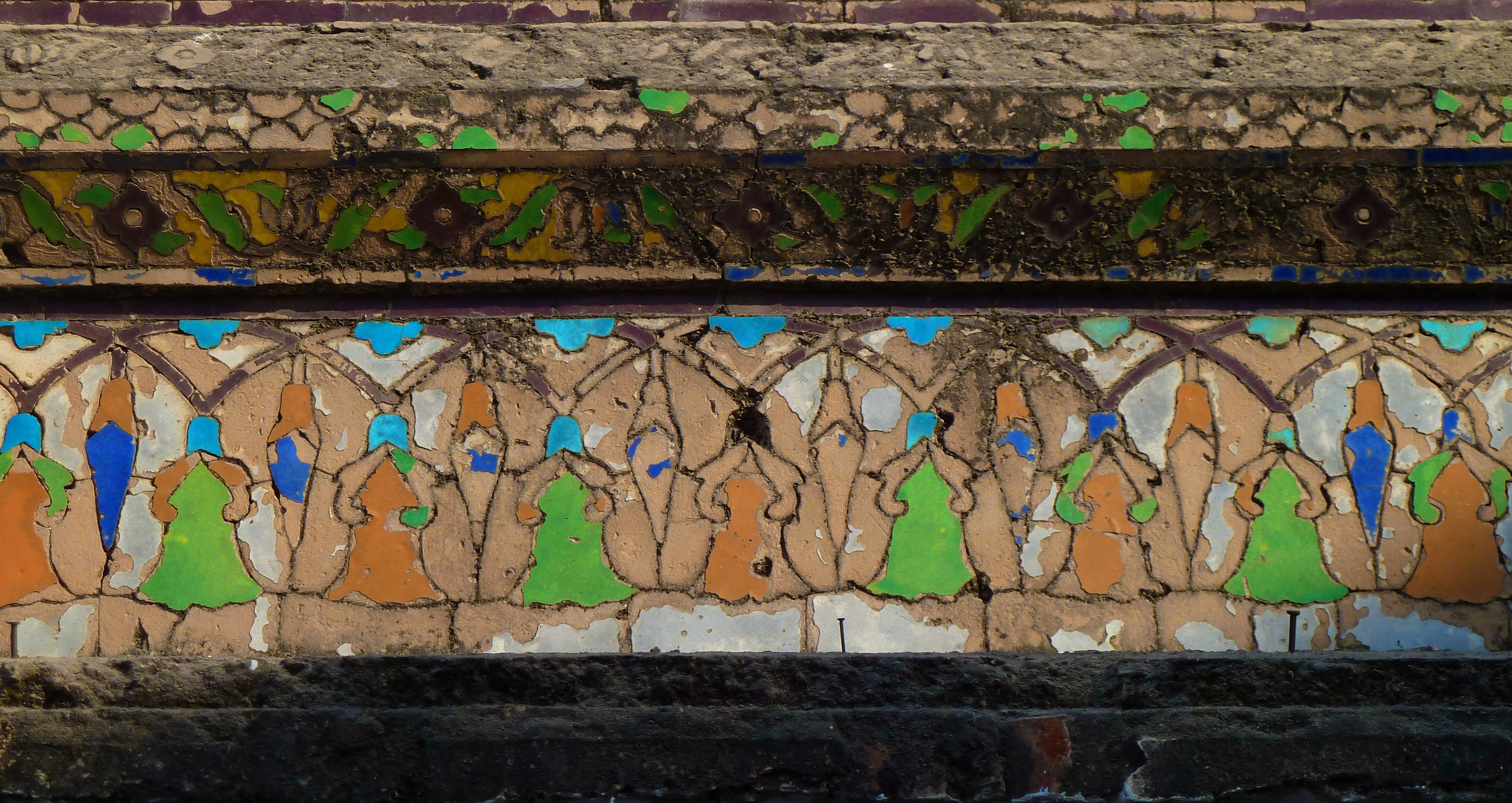

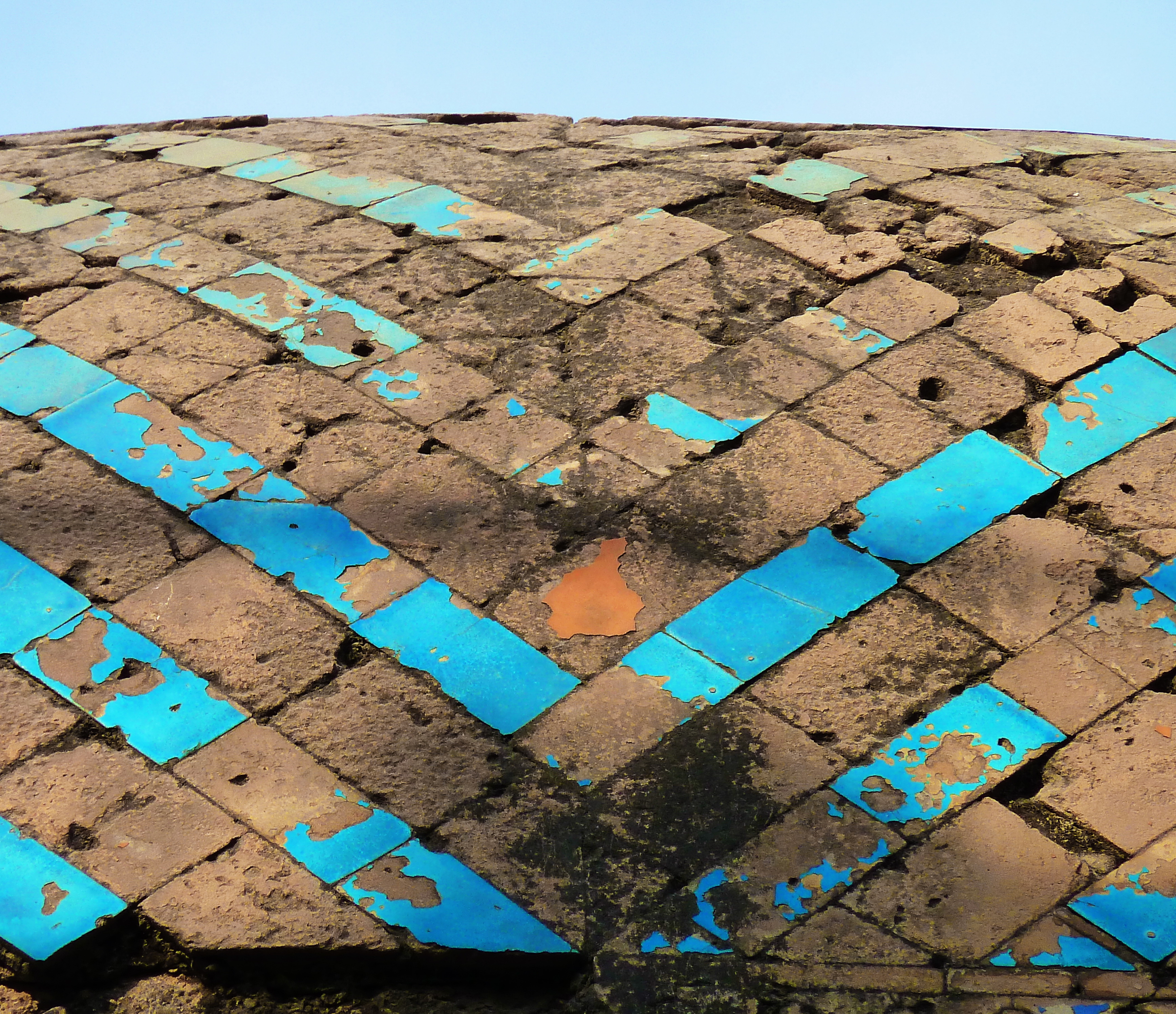
