= St. Anthony's Church, Lahore =

Coordinates: 31°33′51.75″N 74°19′35.28″E

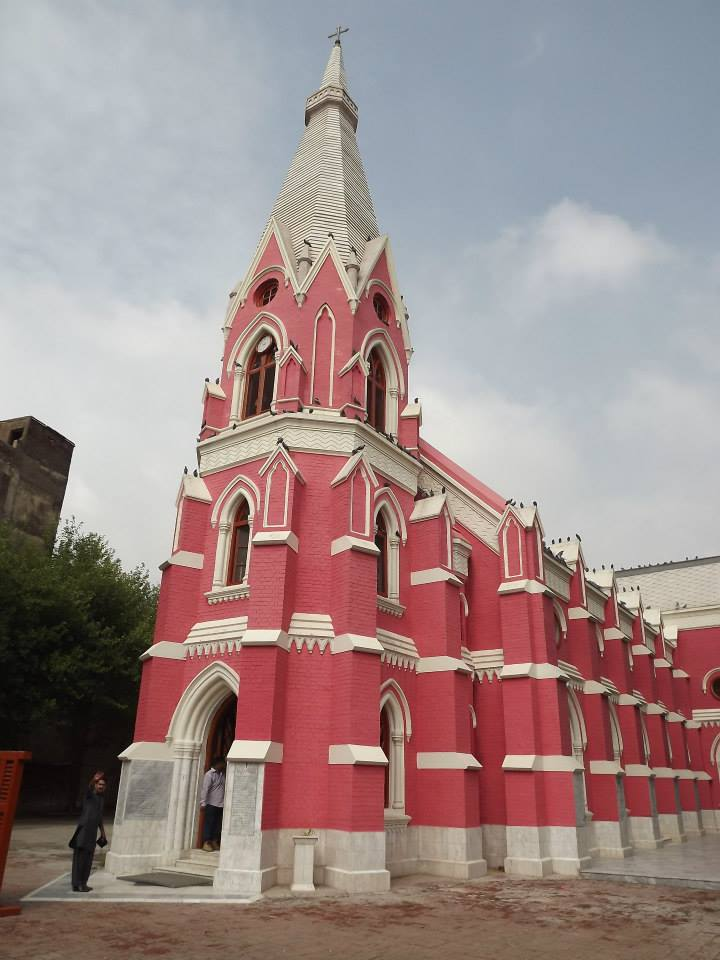
- St. Anthony's Church, Lahore
- St. Anthony's Church, Lahore
- Location: Empress Road, Lahore
- Country: Pakistan
- Language(s): Urdu and English
- Denomination: Roman Catholic
- Tradition: Latin

History
- Founder(s): Bishop Godfrey Pelckmans, Bishop of Lahore
- Consecrated: 1899

Architecture
- Functional status: Active
- Architectural type: Neo-Gothic

Specifications
- Capacity: 1,500
- Materials: brick

Administration
- Archdiocese: Archdiocese of Lahore

St. Anthony's Church, Lahore, located 270 kilometers southeast of Islamabad is one of the oldest churches in the Roman Catholic Archdiocese of Lahore in Pakistan.

== History ==
The church was consecrated in 1899. It was formerly called the "Railway Church."

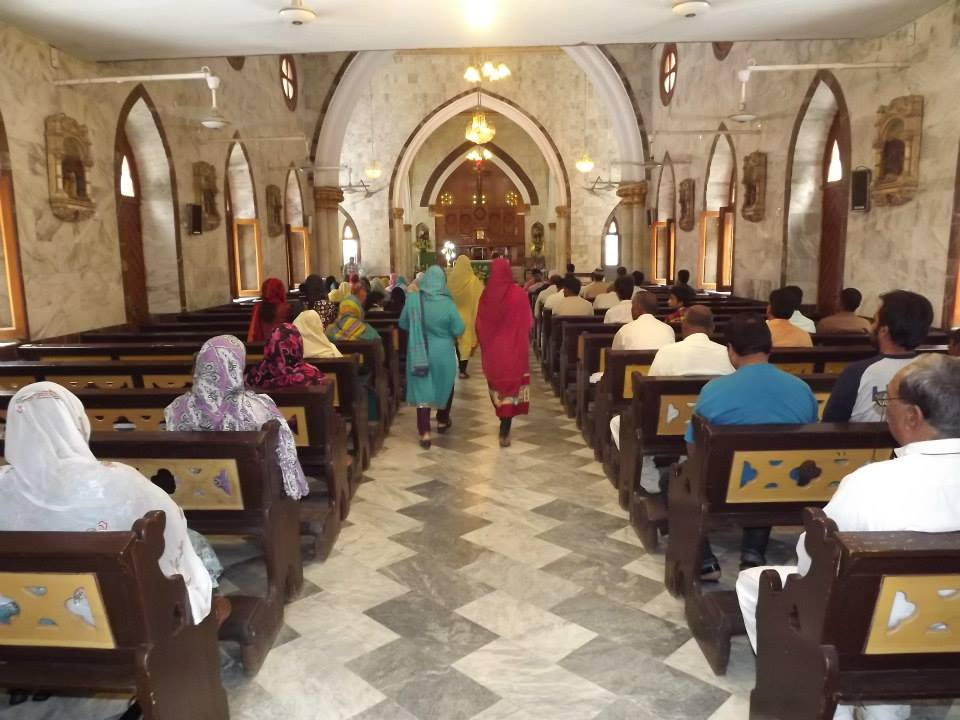
St. Anthony's Church, Lahore

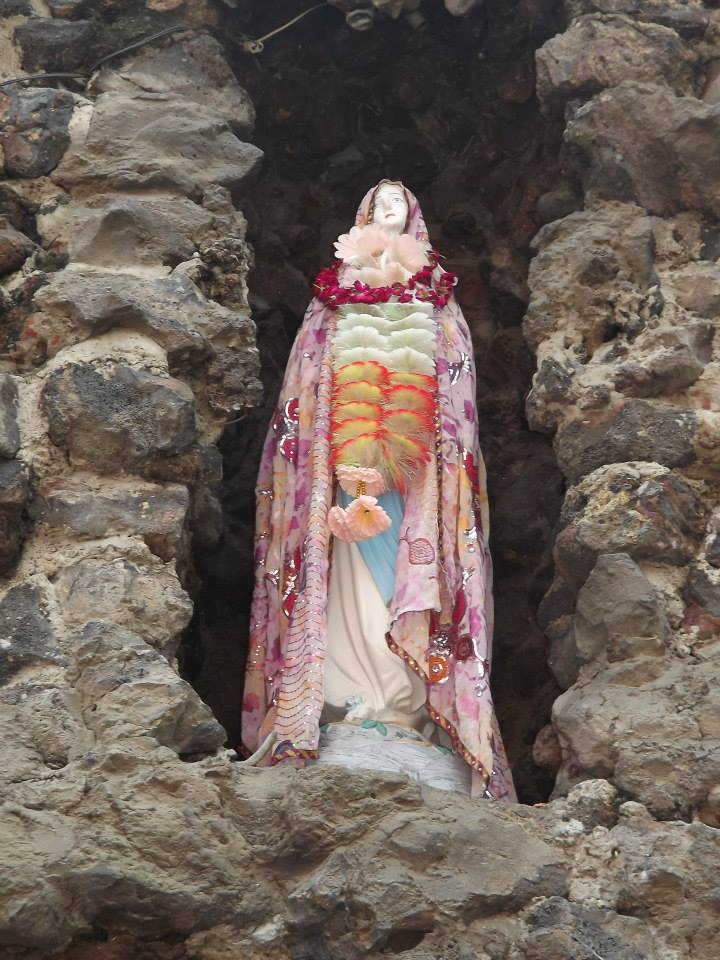
St. Anthony's Church, Lahore

Father Andrew Francis was the pastor of St. Anthony's Parish until becoming Bishop of Multan in 2000, followed by Father Emmanuel Asi, one of the country's leading theologians. Father George Daniel was parish priest from 2004 from 2012 when Father Emmanuel Yousaf Manni replaced him.

To improve relations between Christians and Muslims, the officials at St. Anthony's Church organized a Christian-Muslim meeting on November 19, 2005, and formed Christian-Muslim Rabita (cooperation) Society in Lahore.

The parish has other important ministries, including visiting and teaching prisoners. On May 29, 1990, the Inspector General of prisons in Punjab granted permission to church organizations to hold Bible studies with Christian prisoners. Statistics from 1990 indicate that the 28 jails hosted 35,000 inmates.

On June 12, 2007, more than one thousand Catholics attended the blessing of the expanded wing of St. Anthony's Church. Archbishop Lawrence Saldanha of Lahore conducted the blessing. The construction took two years and was made with contributions collected largely from locals, with additional help from a few foreign donors. The enlargement raised the church's capacity from 900 to 1,500.

On May 11, 2018, Father Emmanuel Yousaf Mani, national director of the Pakistani Catholic bishops' National Commission for Justice and Peace, distributed financial assistance to each of the relatives of the 39 Christians in prison, at St. Anthony's Church.
