= Hujra of Mir Mahdi =

- ہجرہ میر مہدی
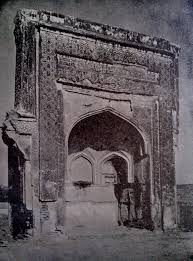
- Hujra of Mir Mahdi, Kot Khwaja Saeed, Lahore
- Interactive map of Hujra of Mir Mahdi
- Location: Kot Khwaja Saeed, Lahore, Punjab, Pakistan
- Coordinates: 31°35′35″N 74°21′18″E
- Designer: Syed Mubarak Shah II
- Type: Historic monument
- Material: Brick and lime mortar
- Beginning date: 1422
- Dedicated date: 1422
- Dedicated to: Mir Mahdi
- Architectural style: Lodhi period

The Hujra of Mir Mahdi is a historical monument located in Lahore, attributed to the early 15th-century reign of Syed Mubarak Shah II of the Sayyid dynasty. Constructed in 1422, the monument is one of the oldest surviving structures in the city, representing the era of reconstruction that followed the devastation of the Mongol invasions.

== Background ==
The construction of the Hujra is deeply linked to the rehabilitation of Lahore following the 1398 invasion by the Mongol ruler Taimur Lung. The raids left the city pillaged and desolate; for seven years, it was described locally as a "city where only owls live". In 1421–1422, Syed Mubarak Shah II, the ruler of Delhi, mobilized forces to retake the area.

Upon reclaiming Lahore, Mubarak Shah initiated a repopulation campaign, dispatching officials to surrounding villages to urge displaced residents to return and inviting merchants from across the subcontinent to settle in the city. Historical accounts note a phased recovery: initially, men returned without their families, leading to the moniker "the city where no woman lives", before full family units eventually repopulated the area. During this period (1422–1441), the administration also constructed kos minars (mile markers) to facilitate travel and warn against potential Mongol incursions.

The Hujra was constructed on a high mound to the north of the city, situated across the River Ravi. The geographical landscape of 15th-century Lahore differed from the modern era; the river flowed between the present-day Kot Khawaja Saeed and the Lahore Fort, curving around the oblong-shaped walled city. This historical river path, which later shifted westward leaving behind the Buddha Darya (Old River) arc, dictated the morphological development of the city.

== Architecture ==
The Hujra displays characteristics of the Lodhi period. It predates many of the Mughal monuments and is distinct from the resting places of earlier saints, such as Ali Hujwiri (Data Ganj Bakhsh) or Qutb-ud-din Aibak, which originally consisted of simple graves rather than elaborate monuments. Consequently, the Hujra is cited as arguably the oldest standing monument in Lahore.

== Mir Mahdi ==
The nomenclature of the Hujra is believed to honor Mir Majzub Mahdi Shirazi ibn Mas'um Ali Shah Shirazi, a religious scholar and Sufi also known as Mulla Sad'ra Shirazi. Historical deduction suggests he was the ustad (teacher) of Mubarak Shah. This identification is supported by the writings of the Mughal Prince Dara Shikoh, who mentions Mulla Sad'ra Shirazi in his works Safinah-al-Awalia and Hasanat-ul-Arefin, noting that the great Sufi saint Mian Mir held Shirazi in high esteem.

The cultural environment of the time was influenced by the friendly relations between Mubarak Shah and Raja Zain-ul-Abedin of Kashmir. Both leaders were of Sayyid lineage and promoted liberal traditions; Zain-ul-Abedin is credited with translating the Ramayana and the Mahabharata into Persian and introducing Iranian papier-mâché crafts to the region.
