= Mian Wada =

Mian Muhammad Ismail Suharwardy (died 1085), commonly known as Mian Wadda, was an Islamic scholar of the Suharwardy order.

Muhamad Ismail was a hafiz-e-Quran. He was born in the village of Tarkranm in Potohar (now in Punjab, Pakistan). His father's name was Fateh Ullah, whose ancestors were agriculturists. Fateh Ullah is buried in the village of Jabba on the Chenab River. Mian Wadda's parents moved to Langay where he became a student of Muslim saint Makhdum Abdul Karim.

Following his service to Makhdum, Muhammad Ismail started Quranic education at Langay. Later he moved to Lahore. In Lahore he came to Tailipura, to a mosque with lower attendance, but remained restless. On a pious person's advice, he spent forty days in chilla-nashini on the mausoleum of Data Ganj Bakhsh. Following this, the mosque became so full of students that it shifted to another mosque west of the Daras.

He died in 1085 and his mausoleum is located on Shalamar Link Road, Lahore, Pakistan. The Sajada Nashin of his mausoleum is Al-Haaj Sahabzada Mian Masood Ahmad.
