= Javed Manzil =

- جاوید منزل
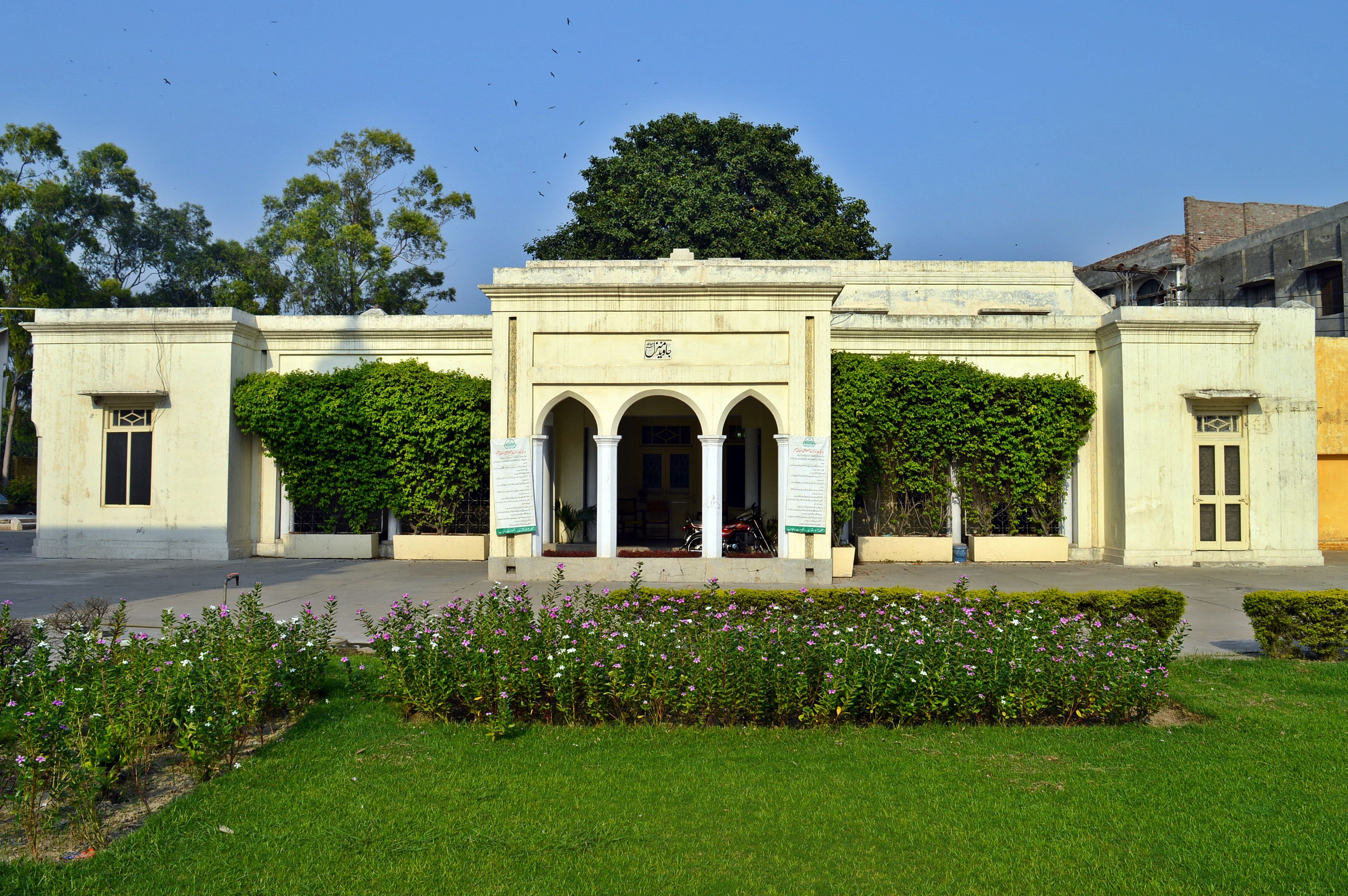
- Javed Manzil Front view

General information
- Type: Public monument
- Location: Lahore, Pakistan
- Coordinates: 31°34′6.85″N 74°20′25.76″E
- Completed: 1935
- Cost: 42,025 British Indian Rupees

Design and construction
- Architect: Mohammad Iqbal

The Javed Manzil or the Allama Iqbal Museum is a monument and museum in Lahore, Pakistan. Muhammad Iqbal lived there for three years, and died there. It was listed as a Tentative UNESCO site, and was protected under the Punjab Antiquities Act of 1975, and declared a Pakistani national monument in 1977. In honour of Iqbal, the national poet of Pakistan, it was converted into a museum, inaugurated in December 1984.

== Location ==
The museum is located on the Allama Iqbal Road (previously known as Mayo Road) in Lahore, Punjab, Pakistan.

== Construction ==
The building's construction was undertaken by Iqbal, to serve as his residence. The building was European in style and was completed in 1935. The cost of construction was 42,025 British Indian Rupees. The residence was built on a plot purchased by Iqbal in 1934 for Rs. 25,025, covering an area of 2,930 square metres (31,500 sq ft). Iqbal named the residence "Javed Manzil" after his son Javid Iqbal. Of all Iqbal's residences in Lahore, only the Javed Manzil belonged to him.

== Conversion to a museum ==
On 10 May 1961 the Government of Pakistan announced plans to convert the site into a museum to preserve Iqbal's belongings and the display of his famous works and manuscripts. The Pakistani government bought the residence from Iqbal's son for Rs. 3.5 million (equivalent to Rs. 18 million or US$64,000 in 2021). The museum covers the historical period from 1877 to 1938, and contains handwritten drafts of Iqbal's works, photographs, certificates, awards and medals and educational degrees. Javid Iqbal also donated six hundred objects belonging to his father to the museum. There is also a library and nine galleries in the museum. The museum was renovated and was inaugurated in December 1984 by Pakistani President Muhammad Zia-ul-Haq.

== See also ==
- Minar-e-Pakistan
- History of Pakistan
