= Fakir Khana =

Coordinates: 31.5832°N 74.3097°E

Fakir Khana Museum
- موزه فقیر خانہ
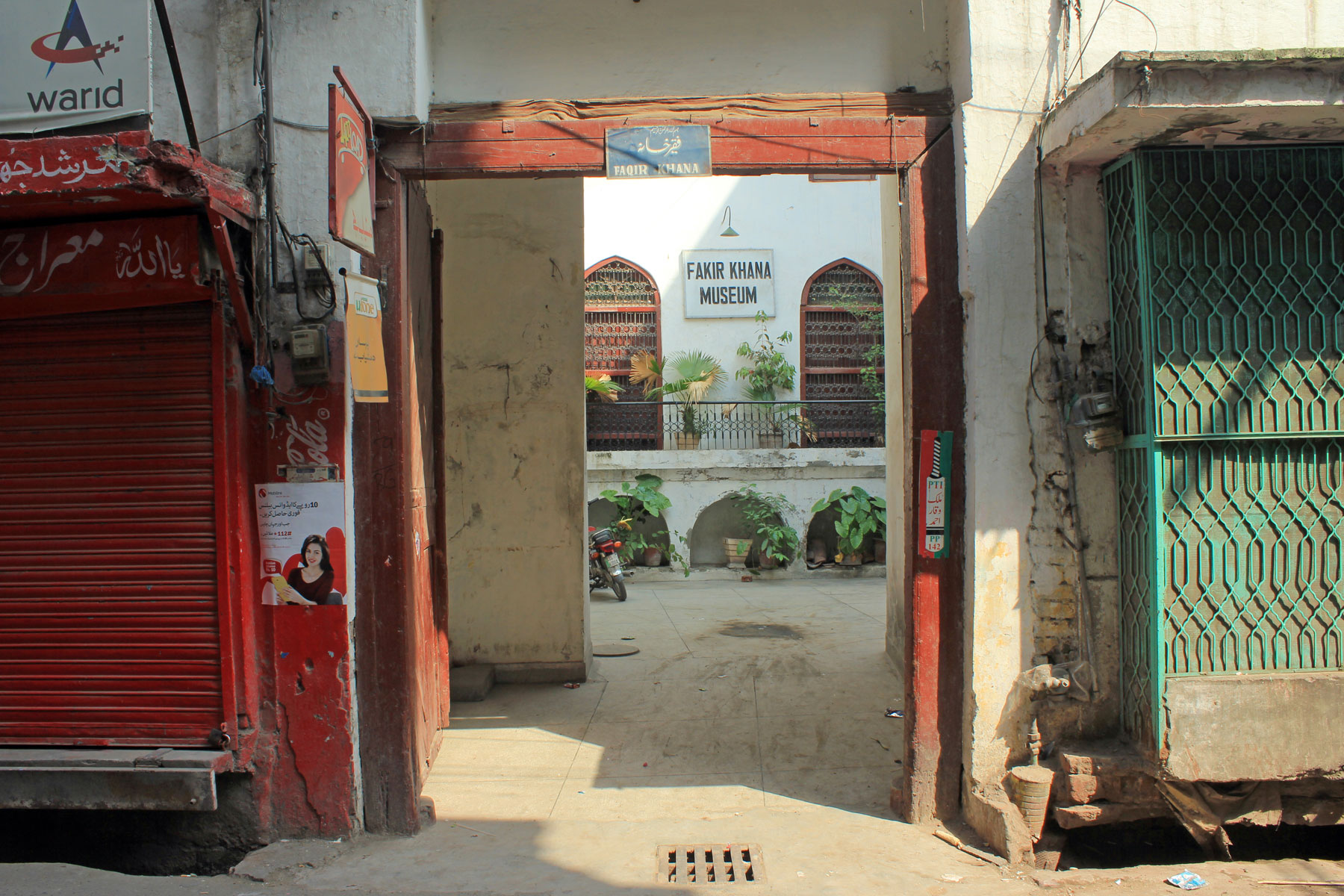
- Established: 1901 (as a public museum)
- Location: Lahore's Walled City, Hakimaan Bazaar, near Bhati Gate, Lahore
- Type: Private museum and house
- Collection size: Over 20,000 objects
- Owner: Fakir family

Fakir Khana (Urdu: فقیر خانہ) is a private museum and house located in Lahore, Pakistan, owned by the Fakir family. Fakhir Khana contains over 20,000 objects, and is the largest privately owned museum in South Asia.

== Location ==
The museum is located within Lahore's Walled City, along the Hakimaan Bazaar, near the Bhati Gate, one of the famous 13 gates of the old Walled City.

== Background ==
The Fakir family settled in Lahore around 1730, and established a publishing house. Their status in Lahore society derived from its connections to the Sikh Empire - three of the family's ancestors, Fakir Nooruddin, Fakir Azizuddin, and Fakir Imamuddin, served as emissaries to Maharaja Ranjit Singh. The family amassed a collection of objects, including many bestowed to the family by Ranjit Singh. The family opened their house as a museum to the public in 1901, and the site receives some government funds for its maintenance.

== Collection ==
The museum's collection consists of approximately 21,000 pieces of art and artifacts mostly from the 18th to 20th centuries, including a small collection of Gandharan artifacts. The collection also contains numerous gifts bestowed to the Fakir family by Ranjit Singh, as well as 10,000 manuscripts, 180 displayed miniature paintings, Sikh-era textiles, statuary, pottery, and carved ivory pieces. The collection also includes a 30.4 cm × 15.2 cm painting of Nawab Mumtaz Ali, that was painted with a single hair and required 15 years to be completed.

== House ==
The house in which the museum is located offers insight into the lifestyles of upper class Lahori families during the Sikh and British eras. It was originally owned by Raja Todar Mal, finance minister to the Mughal Emperor Akbar.
