= St. Andrew's Church, Lahore =

Pakistani church building

Coordinates: 31°57′02″N 74°33′58″E

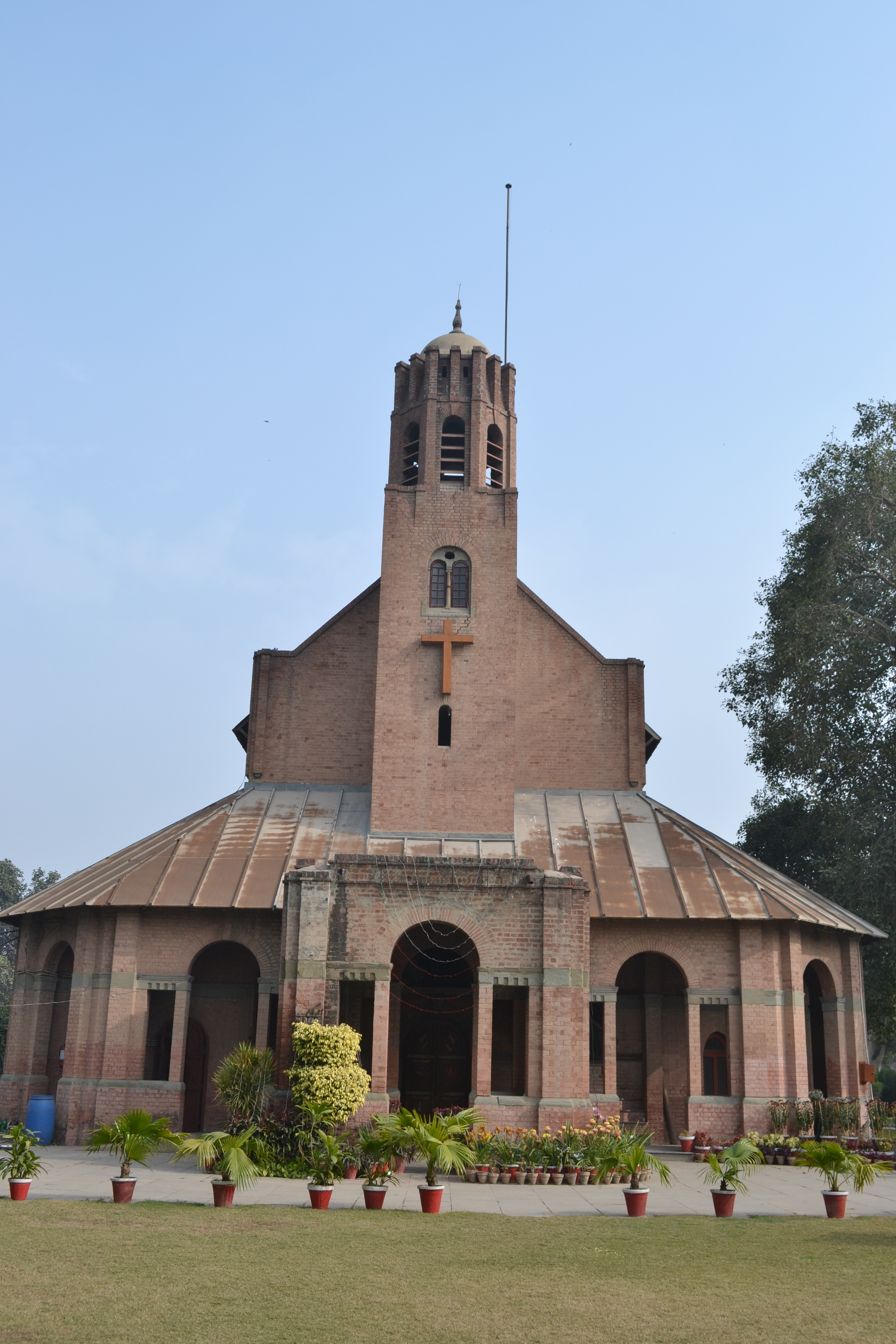
St. Andrew's Church, Lahore

St. Andrew's Church, located on Empress Road in Lahore, Pakistan, is a historic place of worship built in 1872 by the British for Christian employees of the Railways. Designed in the Neo-Gothic architectural style prevalent at the time, the church holds significant historical and cultural value.

As part of the Diocese of Lahore under the Church of Pakistan, St. Andrew's Church is also recognised globally as a member of the Anglican Communion. Its vibrant ministry continues to support and uplift Christians in Pakistan.

The current Vicar, Rev. Irshad John, joined St. Andrew's Church in 1991. Since then, he has been actively serving in the Diocese of Lahore and continues to lead the church's ministry. St. Andrew's Church engages with the Christian community through various fellowships, including Children's Fellowship, Youth Fellowship, Men's Fellowship, Healing and Prayer Fellowship, and Women's Fellowship.

== Location Empress Road ==
It was built near the Lahore Railways Headquarters. It is also known as the St Andrew's Church Empress Road Lahore.
