= Tomb of Anarkali =

Monument in Lahore, Pakistan

- مقبرۂ انارکلی
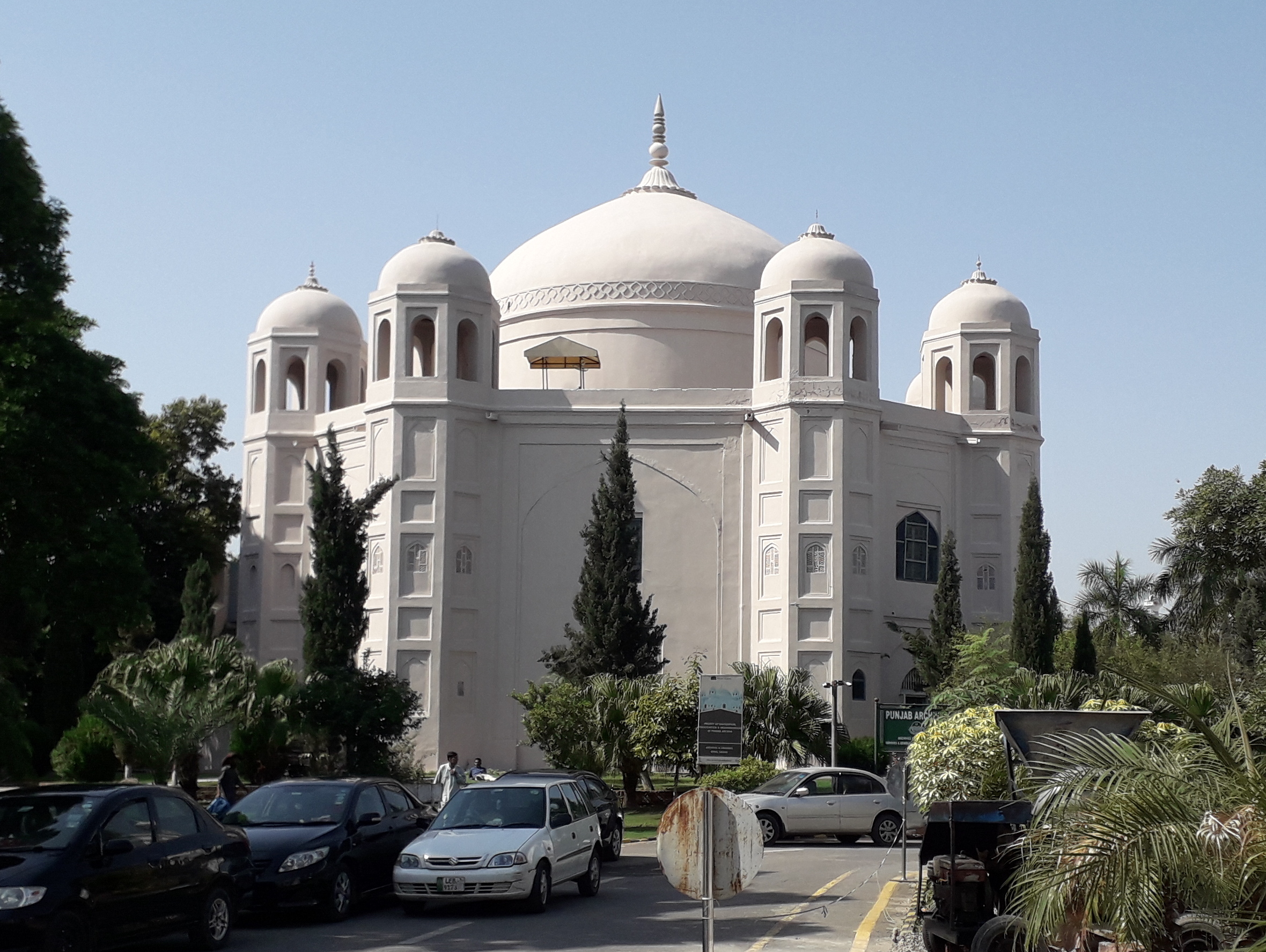
- Interactive map of Tomb of Anarkali
- Location: Lahore, Punjab, Pakistan
- Coordinates: 31°34′03″N 74°18′02″E
- Type: Mausoleum
- Material: brick
- Completion date: 1599, or 1615
- Dedicated to: Anarkali

The Tomb of Anarkali (Urdu: مقبرۂ انارکلی) is an octagonal 16th-century Mughal monument in Lahore, Punjab, Pakistan.

== Location ==
The tomb of Anarkali is located on the grounds of Lahore's Punjab Civil Secretariat complex near the British-era Mall, southwest of the Walled City of Lahore. It is considered to be one of the earliest Mughal tombs still in existence, and one of the most significant buildings of the early Mughal period. The building is currently used as the Punjab Archives, and public access is limited.

== History ==
Construction of the tomb dates to either 1599, or 1615.

The tomb was said to have been built by the Mughal Emperor Jehangir for his beloved, named in contemporary travel accounts as Anarkali, who, as per legend, was suspected by Emperor Akbar to have relations with Jehangir, at the time known as Prince Saleem. There is no historic proof of Anarakali's existence other than that of Jahangir's contemporary western traveler's accounts which could not be independently confirmed; the rest is some scholarly speculated hypothesis and/ or subsequent literary fictionalization of her character which often appears in movies, books and fictionalized versions of history.

During the time of the Sikh Empire, the tomb was occupied by Kharak Singh, and later was further desecrated by its conversion into the residence for the wife of General Jean-Baptiste Ventura, who was employed in the army of Ranjit Singh. The tomb was then converted during the British Raj into clerical offices in 1847 before being turned into the Anglican St. James Church in 1851, and later regarded as Lahore's "Protestant Cathedral." In 1891, the church congregation was relocated, and the tomb was repurposed as the Punjab Record Office.

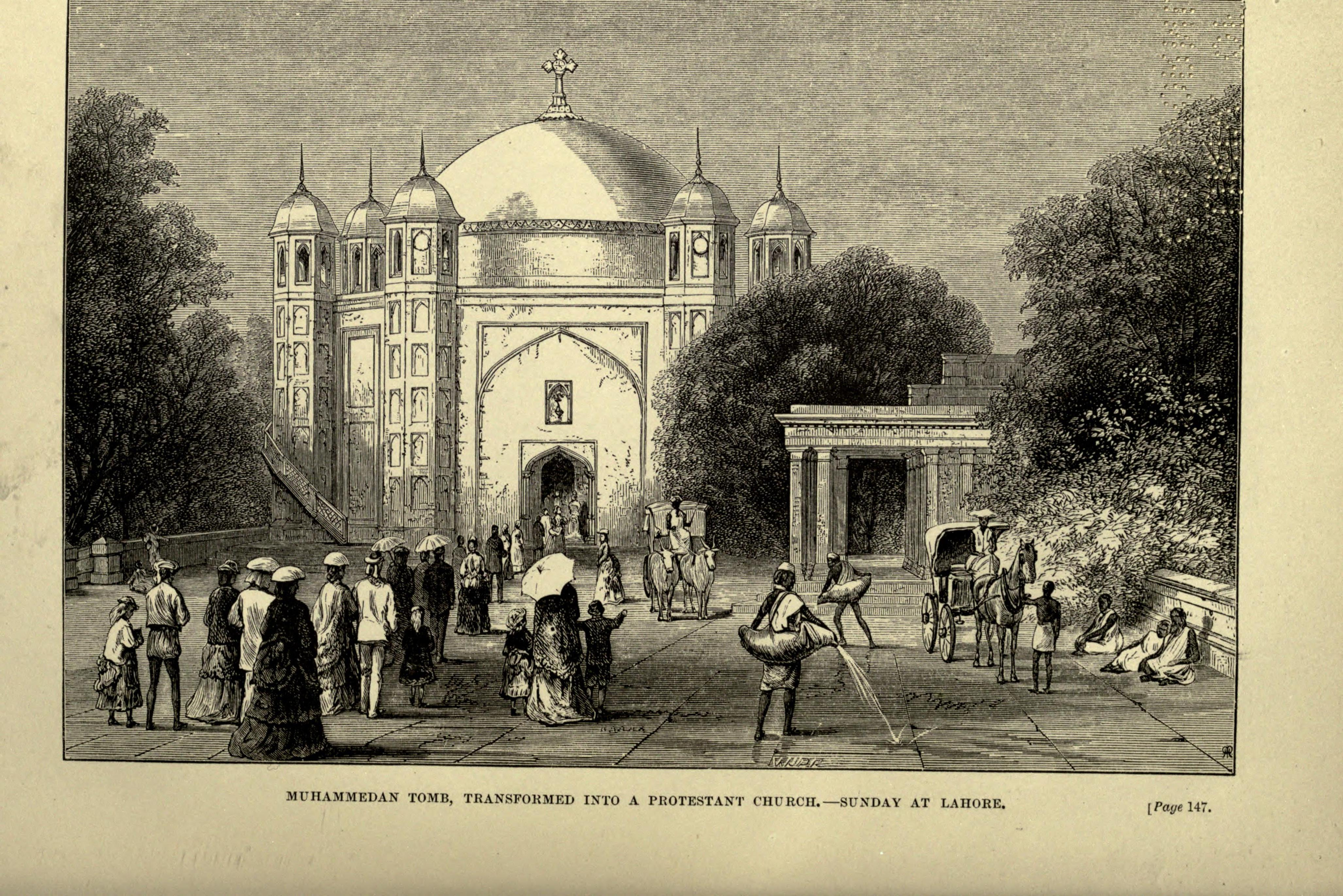
Illustration of the Tomb of Anarkali when it functioned as a church, from 'Letters from India and Kashmir' (1874)

The occupant's cenotaph was removed when the tomb was repurposed into a church. When the building no longer served as a church, the cenotaph was placed at the site of the former altar, and not at the original site of the cenotaph.

== Architecture ==
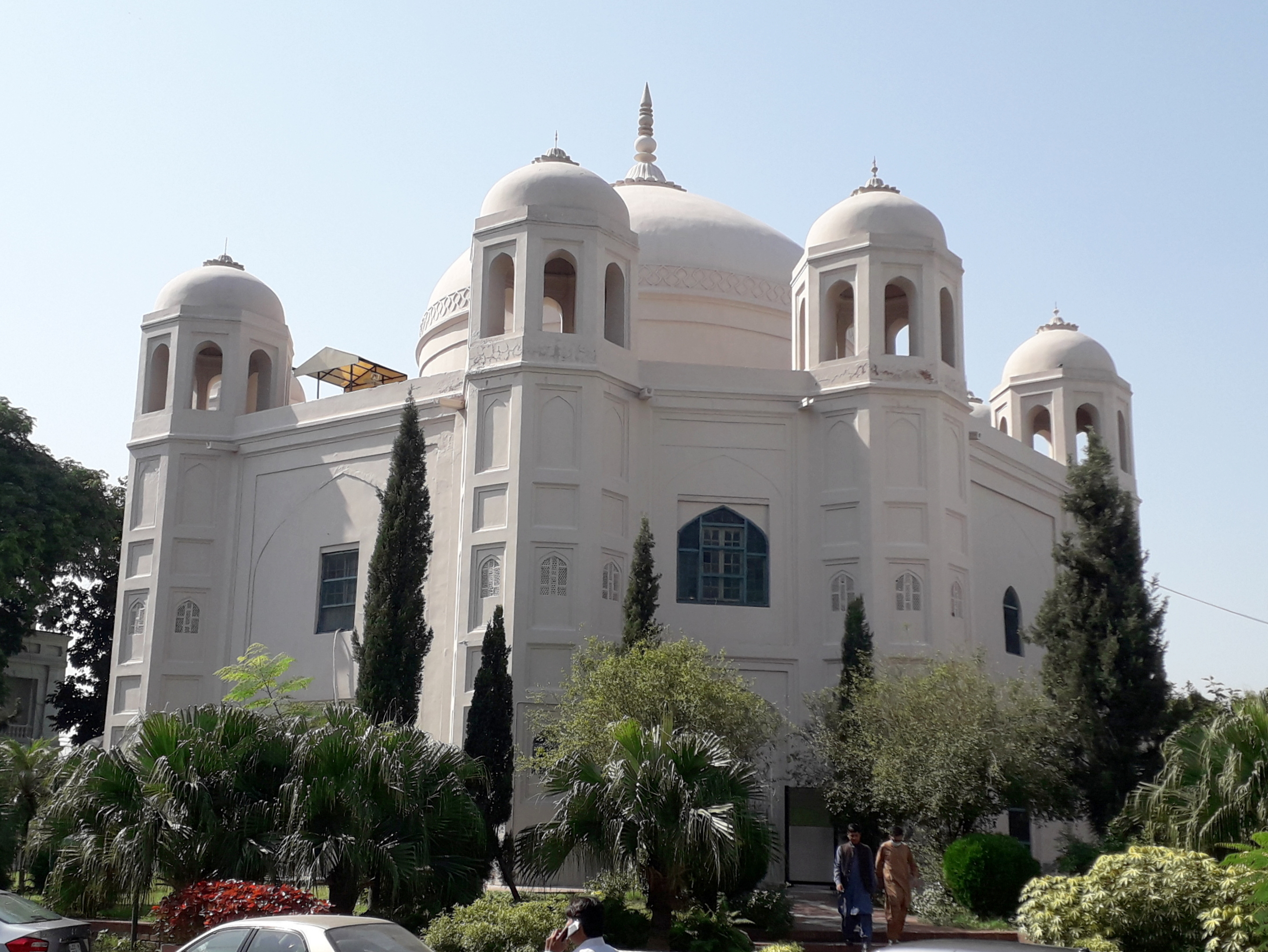
Another view of the Tomb of Anarkali

The structure's foundations are in the basic shape of an octagon, with alternating measurements of 13.4 m and 9.1 m for each side with semi-octagonal towers at each corner. The structure is also topped by a double-dome, and is one of the earlier examples of such a dome from the Mughal era. The dome rests upon 8 arches, each measuring 3.7 m.

The large arches in the sides of the building were once open in typical Mughal fashion, but were blocked off by the British.

The building is today covered in whitewashing. It was reportedly once surrounded by a garden. The building is currently used as the Punjab Archives, so access to the public is limited.

=== Cenotaph ===
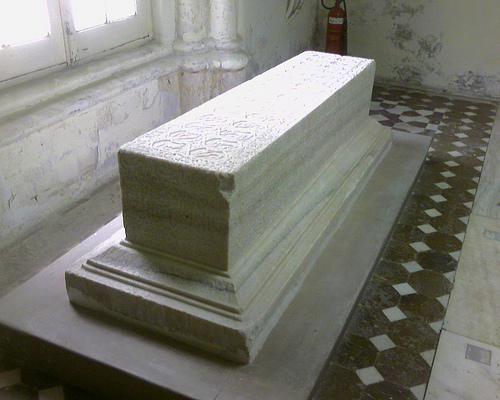
The richly carved cenotaph is made of white marble.

The white marble cenotaph features carvings with the 99 names of Allah, and was described by 19th-century historians as "one of the finest pieces of carving in the world."

Inscription

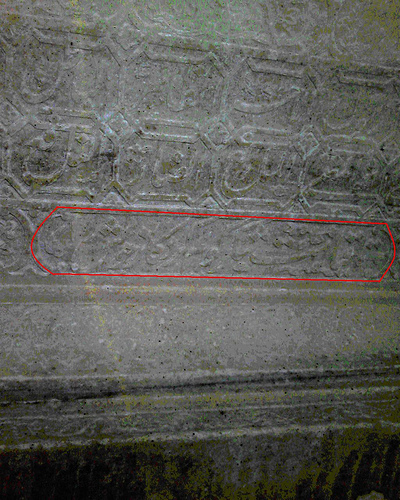
Inscription on the cenotaph

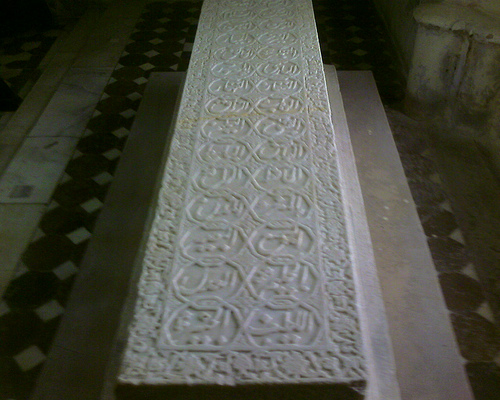
The 99 names of Allah inscribed on the cenotaph.

In addition to the 99 names of Allah, the cenotaph is inscribed with a Persian couplet taken from the Persian poet Saadi which reads:

آه گر من بازبینم روی یار خویش را
تا قیامت شکر گویم کردگار خویش را
Ah gar man baz binam ruyi yari khwish ra
Ta qayamat shukr goyam kardgari khwish ra
"Ah! could I behold the face of my beloved once more,
I would give thanks unto my Creator until the day of resurrection"

== Conservation ==
The tomb is listed on the Protected Heritage Monuments of the Archaeology Department of Punjab.

== In popular culture ==
The Anarkali Tomb was portrayed in Shoaib Mansoor's song "Supreme Ishq" as a shooting location of Anarkali.
