= Greater Iqbal Park =

Urban park in Lahore, Pakistan

Greater Iqbal Park گریٹر اقبال پارک
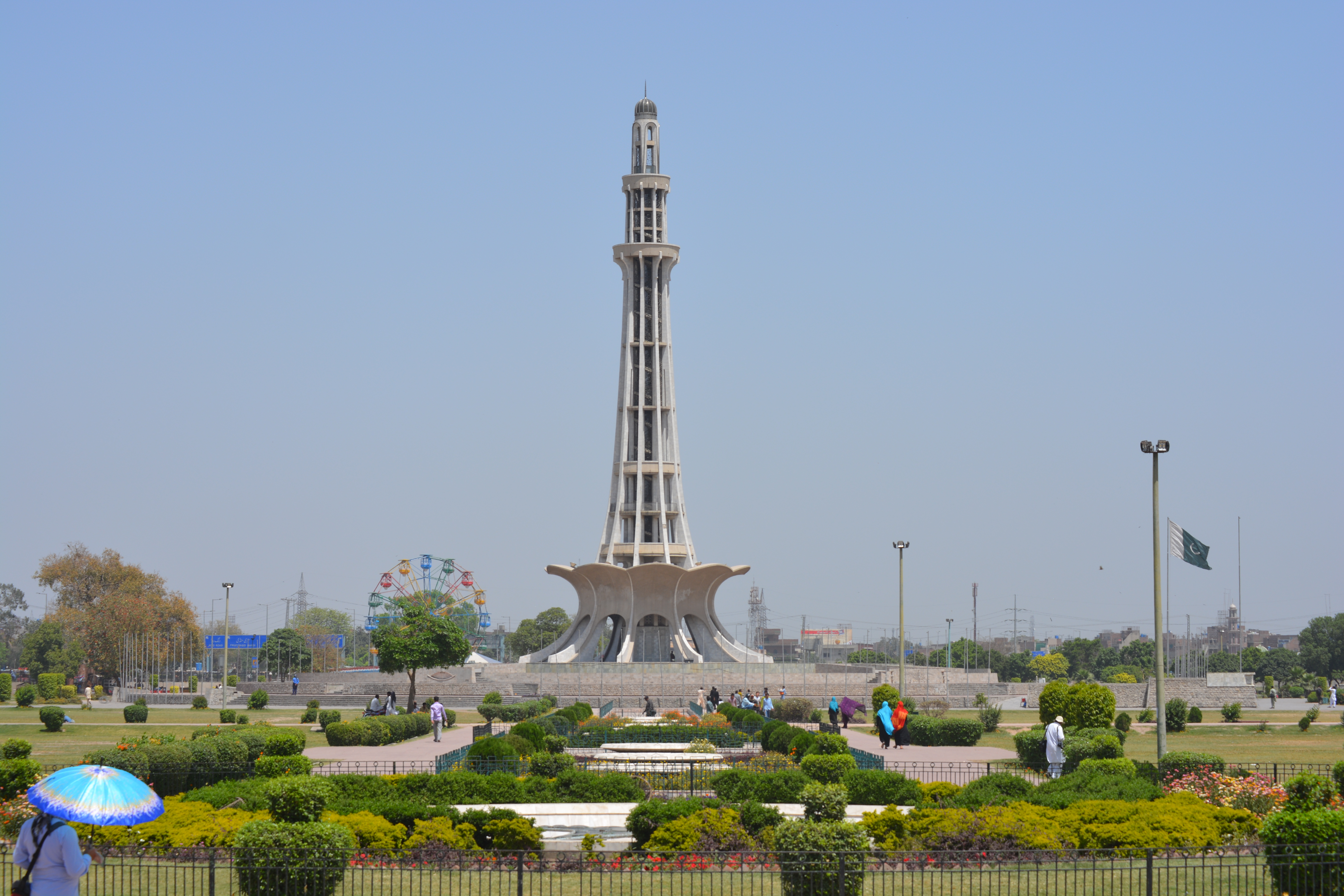
- The Minar-e-Pakistan, central monument of the park
- Interactive map of Greater Iqbal Park گریٹر اقبال پارک
- Type: Urban park
- Location: Lahore, Punjab, Pakistan
- Coordinates: 31.5928°N 74.3126°E
- Area: 133.1 ha
- Created: 1968; 58 years ago
- Owner: Parks and Horticulture Authority Lahore
- Open: 06:00 - 20:00
- Public transit: Azadi Chowk Metrobus Station
- Website: https://www.pha.gop.pk/project-details-new?id=3

Greater Iqbal Park (Punjabi/Urdu: گریٹر اقبال پارک), formerly Iqbal Park (Note: official name from 1947 to 2016) and Minto Park, (Note: official name in during the British Raj) is an urban park, spread over an area of 133.1 ha (329 acres) , located on the outskirts of the Walled City in Lahore, Punjab, Pakistan.

Minar-e-Pakistan is the most notable monument located within the park. It also includes an artificial lake spread over 1.6 hectares which includes a 243.8 m (800 ft) musical fountain. Other attractions include a two-kilometre-long soft rail, a library, an open-air gym and a food court.

The tomb of the poet who composed Pakistan's national anthem, Hafeez Jalandhari, is also located in the park, while Lahore Fort, Hazuri Bagh (including tomb of Iqbal), Ranjit Singh Samadhi and Badshahi Mosque are adjacent to it.

== History ==
The ground known as Greater Iqbal Park today was used for military parades during the Mughal-era. After the rise of the Sikhs into power in 1799, the grounds came to be known as 'Parade Ground', as the area continued to be used for the same purpose as it was before.

When the British captured Lahore in 1849, they renamed the grounds as Minto Park, after Gilbert Elliot-Murray-Kynynmound, 1st Earl of Minto, and Governor-General of India between July 1807 and 1813.

After the independence of Pakistan in 1947, the park was renamed as Iqbal Park, after the poet-philosopher Muhammad Iqbal, in commemoration of the Lahore Resolution of 1940. After extensive renovations were completed in December 2016, the park was given its current name. Prime minister Nawaz Sharif said, "This is not just any piece of land. It is where the Pakistan Resolution of 1940 was adopted".

== Renovation and expansion ==
Work began on the upgradation of the park on 10 October 2015. Habib Construction Services Limited was contracted to complete the project. Along with renovation of the Minar-i-Pakistan, the project featured expansion of the Iqbal Park by including it in the stretch of Circular Road between the park and Lahore Fort. The 50.5 hectare green oasis is surrounded almost entirely by the old city of Lahore. The project was completed on 9 November 2016 incurring a total cost of PKR 981 million as quoted by the contractor of the project.

The new-look park was formally inaugurated on 17 December 2016 at a cost of Rs981 million.

Furthermore, the National History Museum was opened in the park in 2018. It is the first digital museum in Pakistan that offers an immersive experience to visitors with the help of cutting-edge technologies. Using holograms and virtual reality equipment, this digital museum commemorates all the historic events leading to the emergence of Pakistan in 1947. Along with hosting a vast collection of national relics and antiquities, the museum also highlights the key sports and cultural events throughout the history of the country.

== Features ==
The park features the following sites:

- Minar-e-Pakistan
- Tomb of Hafeez Jalandhari
- Musical fountain
- National History Museum
- Library
- Boating lake
- Mughal-style baradari
- Children play area
- Food court
- Open-air gym
- Walking trails
- Buggy track
- Gazebos

== Gallery ==
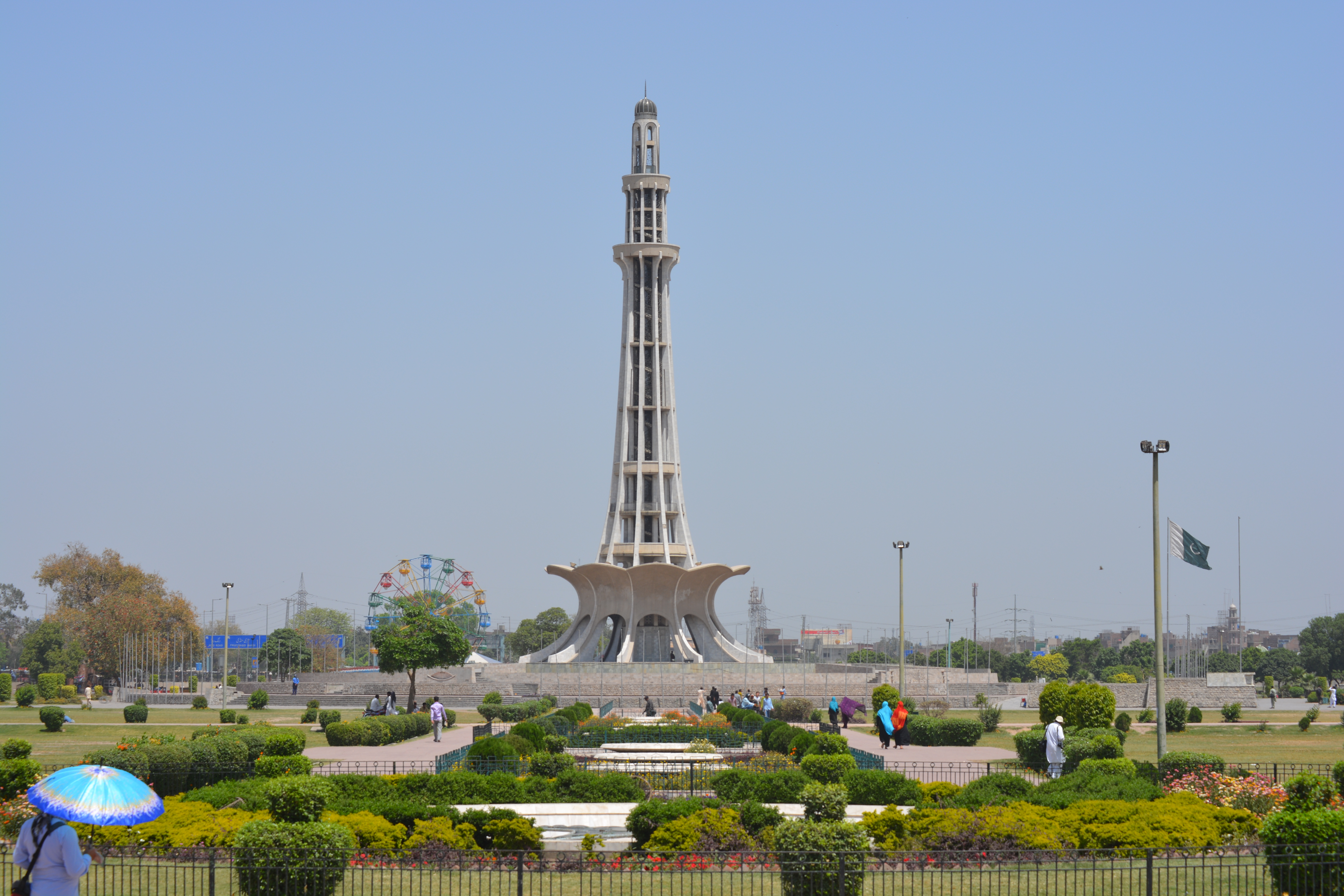
Minar-e-Pakistan and its lush surroundings

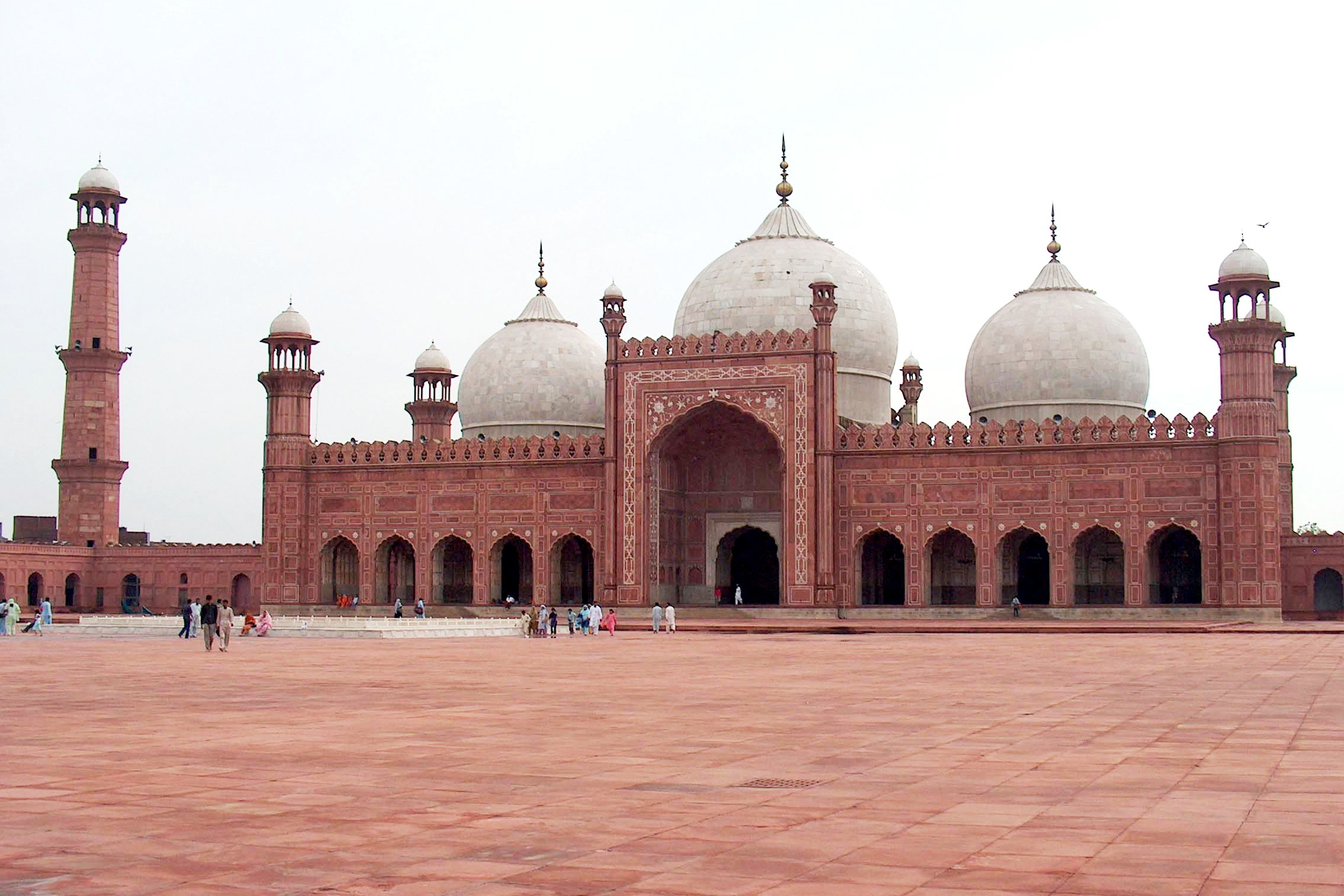
Badshahi Mosque is adjacent to Iqbal Park

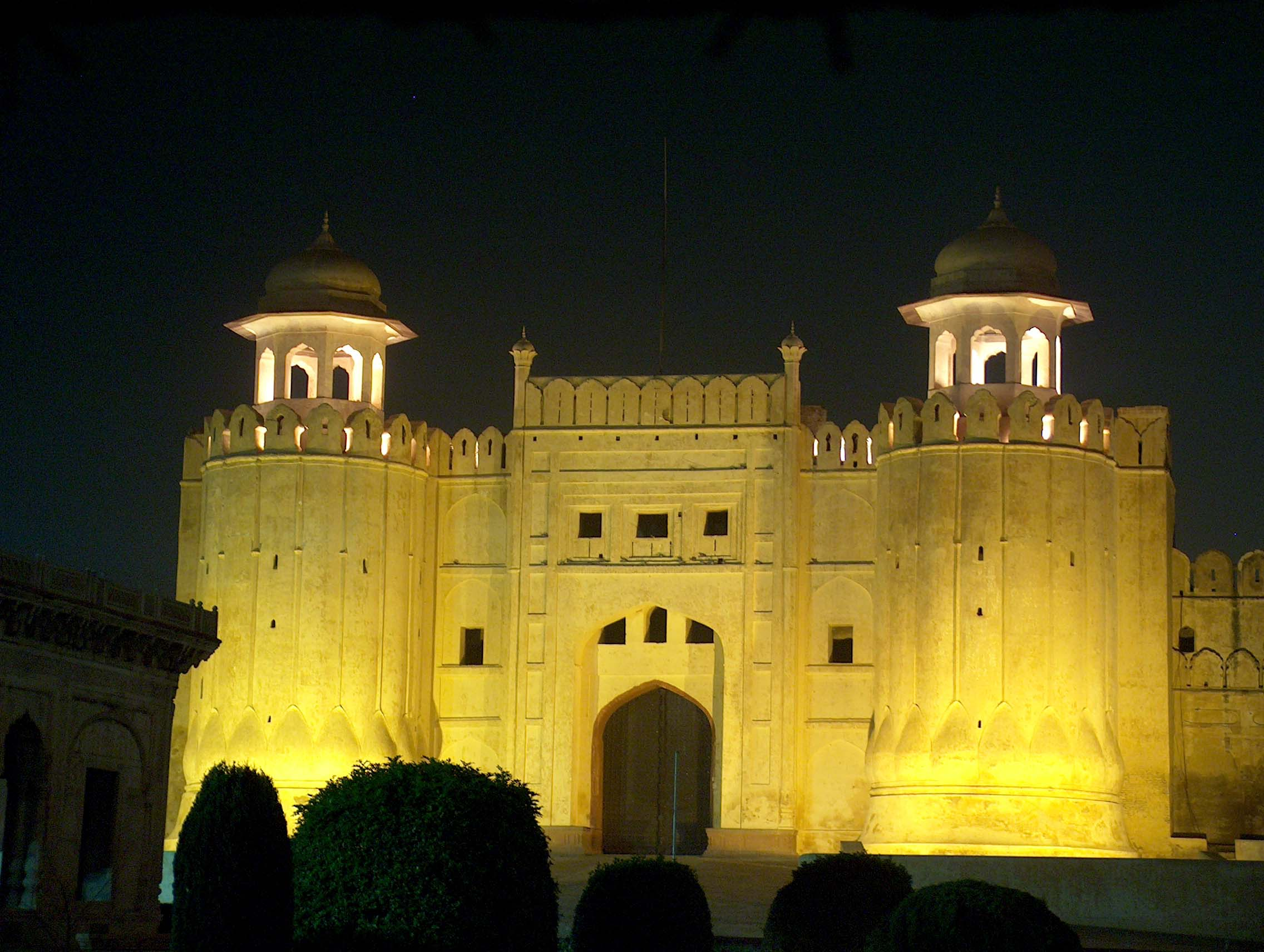
Lahore Fort is adjacent to Iqbal Park

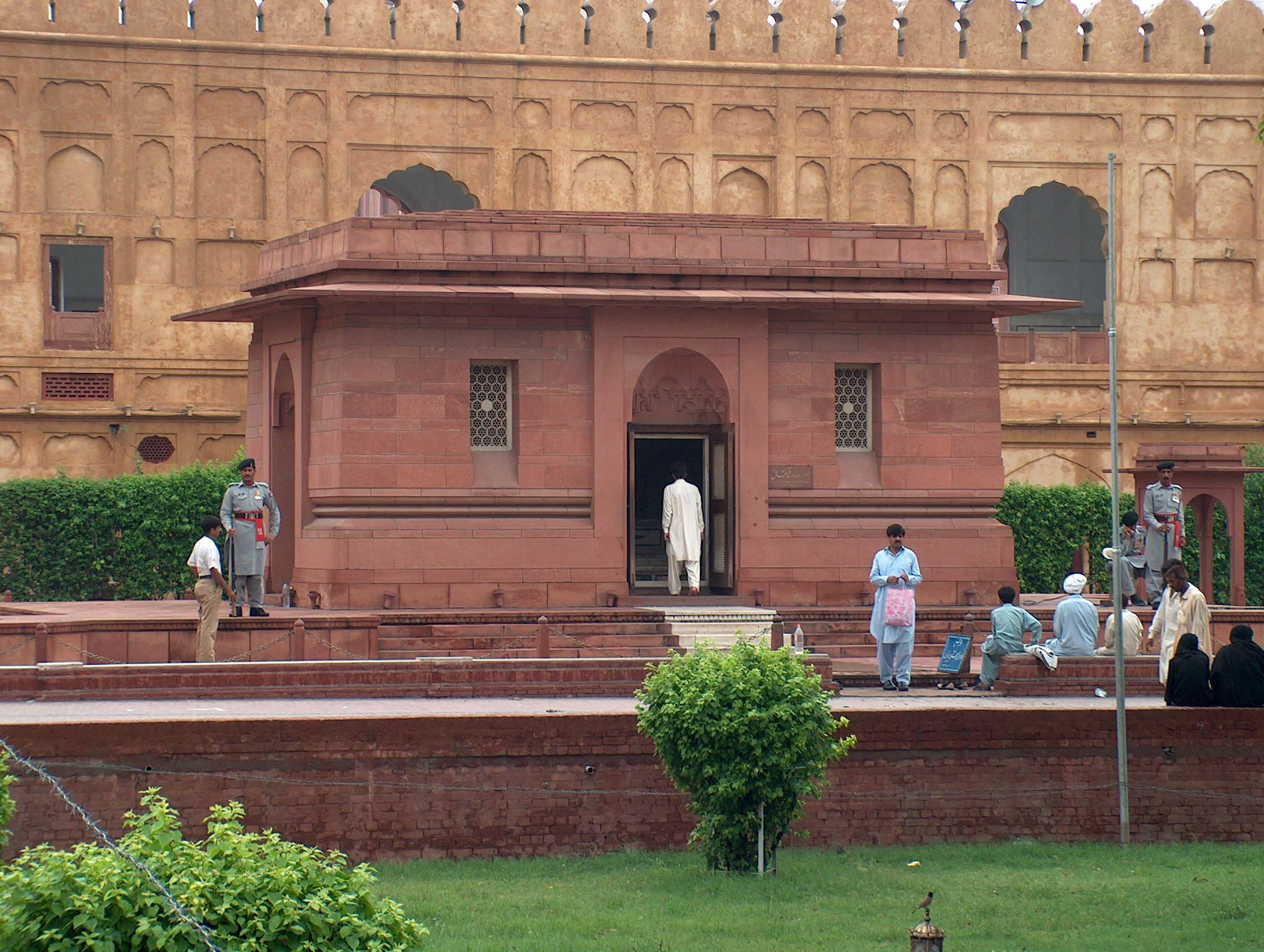
Tomb of Muhammad Iqbal is adjacent to Iqbal Park

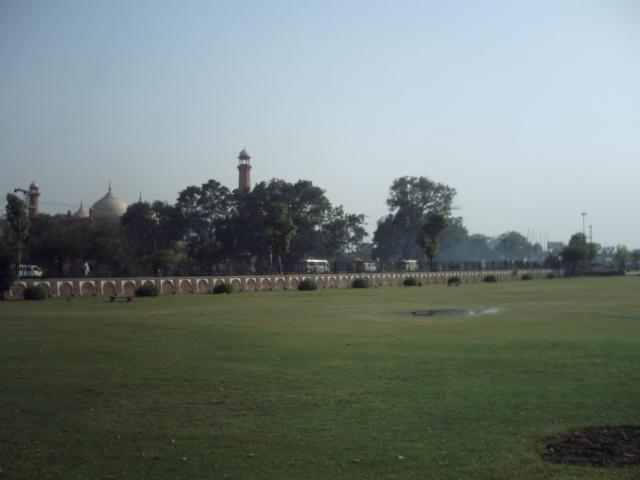
Lush grounds of the park

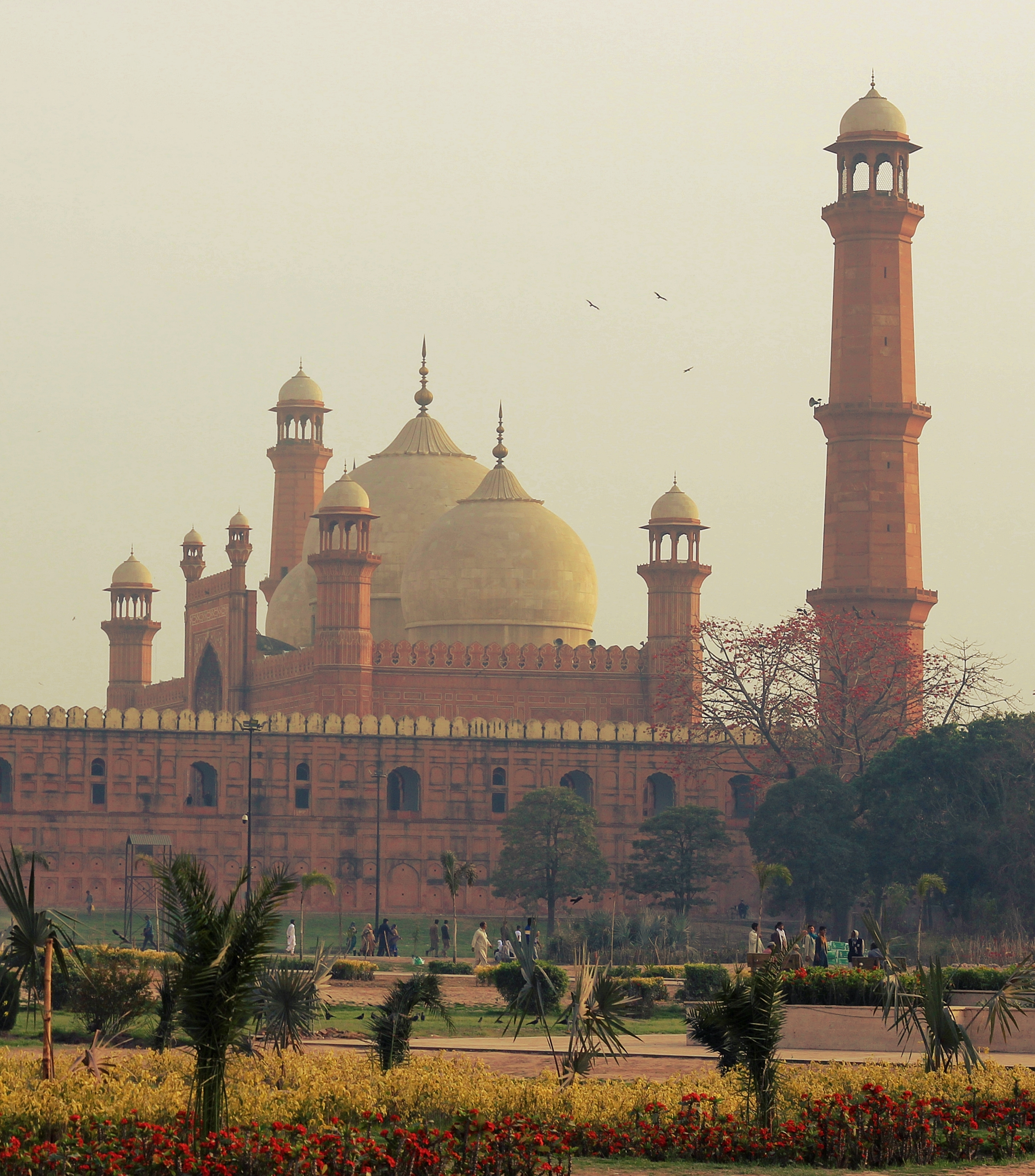
View of Badshahi Mosque from the park

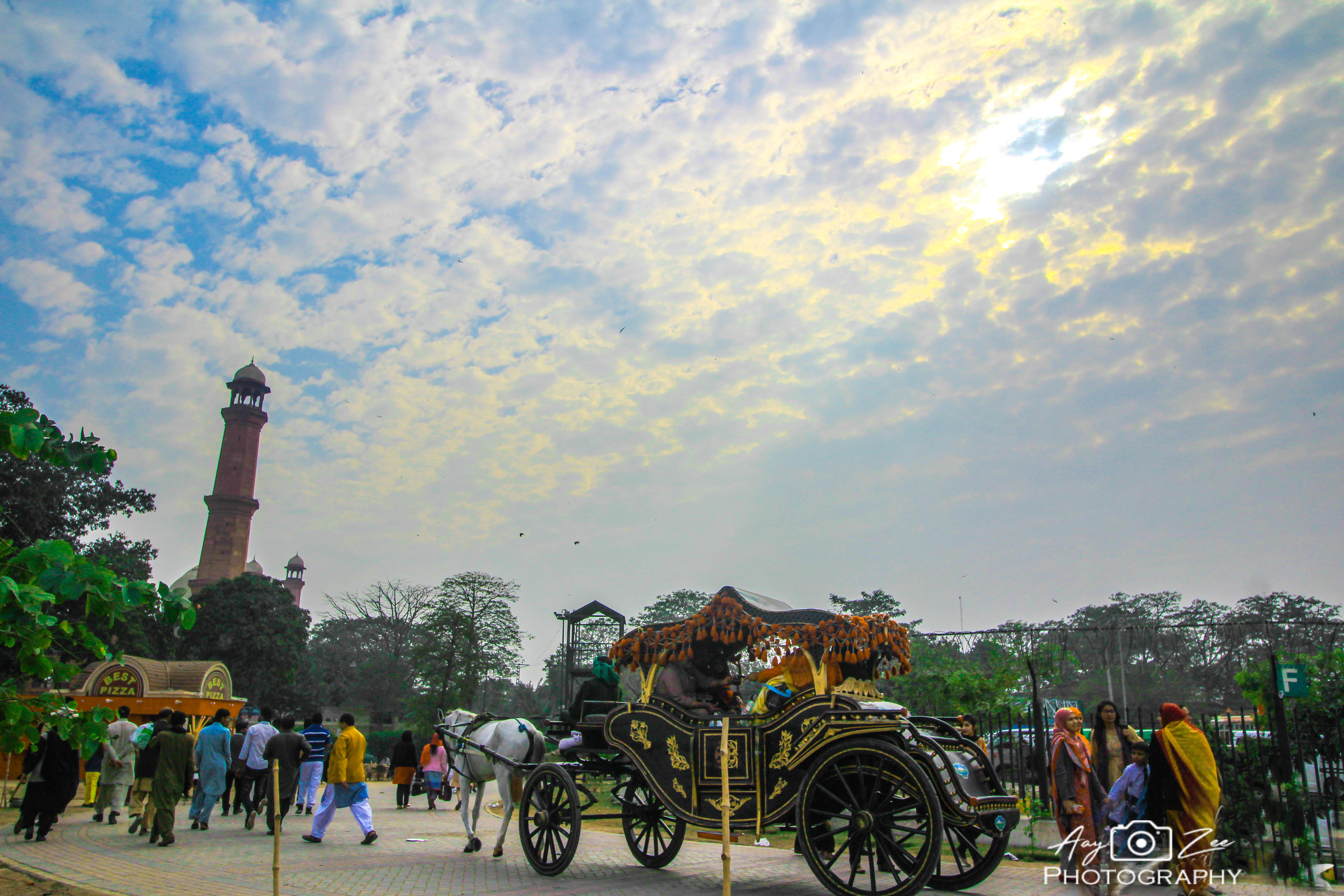
Traditional horse-drawn carriage

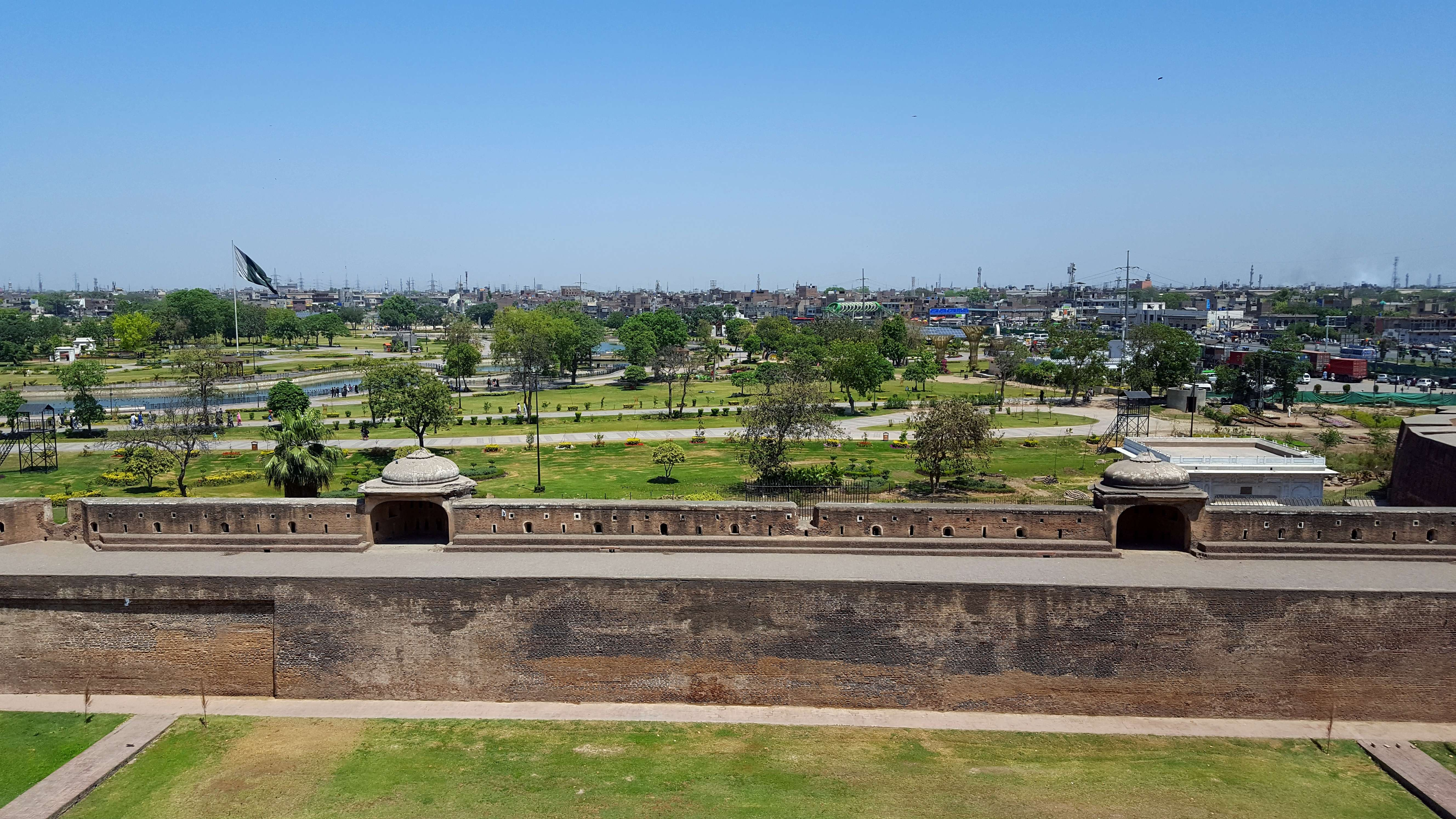
View from Lahore Fort

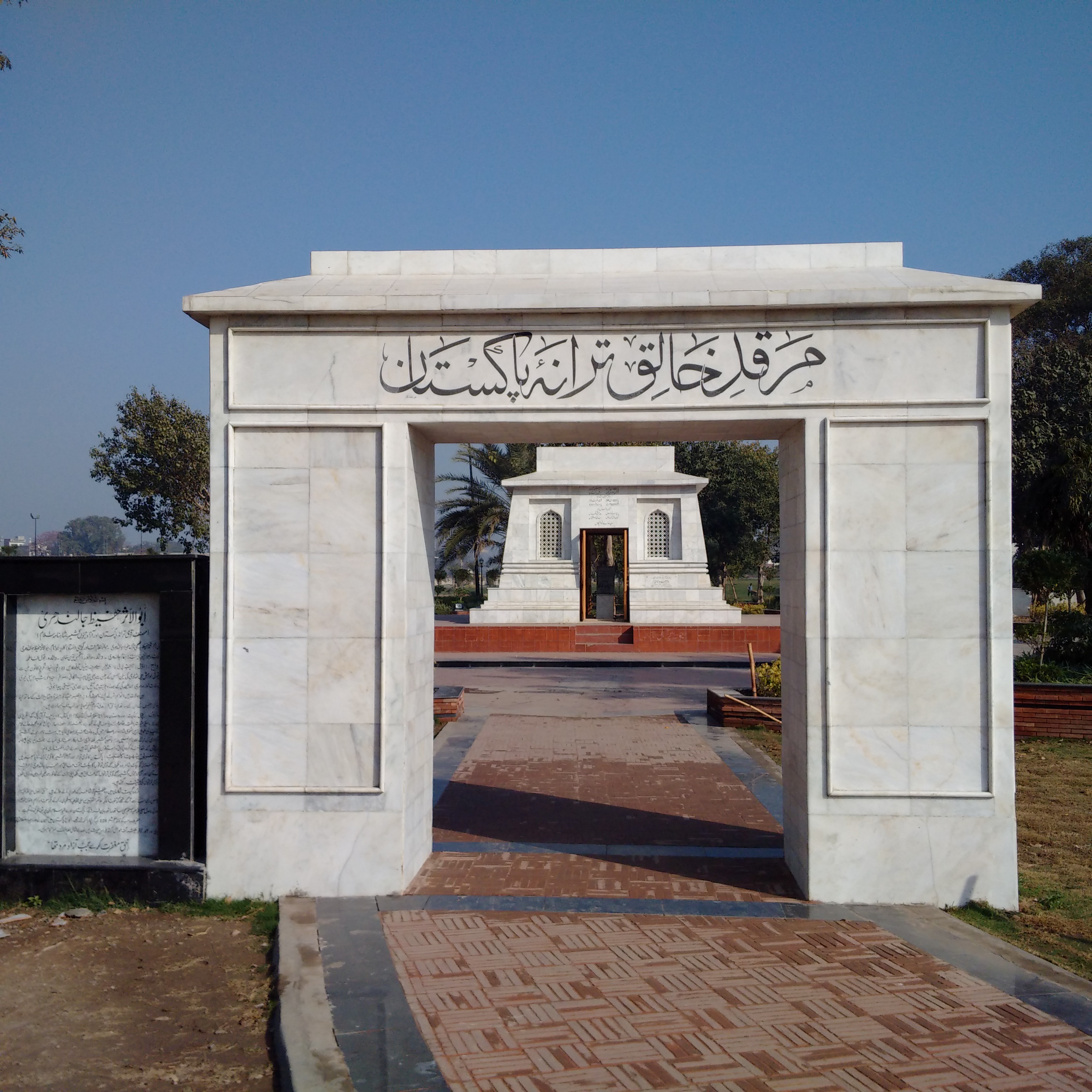
Entrance to Hafeez Jalandhari's tomb

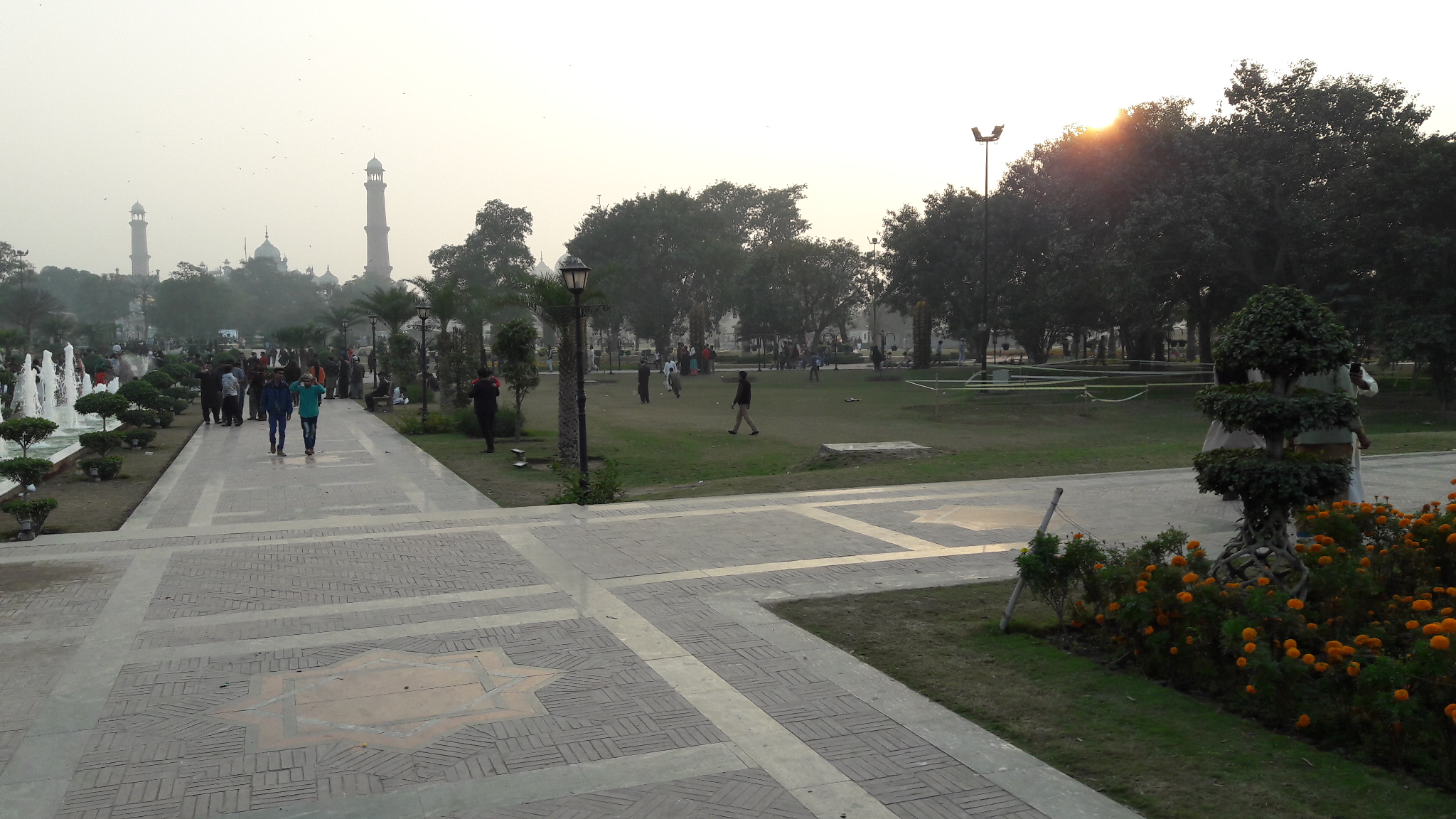
Walking trails at evening

== See also ==
- List of parks and gardens in Pakistan
- List of parks and gardens in Lahore
- List of parks and gardens in Karachi
