= National History Museum (Lahore) =

Museum in Lahore, Pakistan

National History Museum, Lahore
- نیشنل ہسٹری میوزیم
- Established: 17 April 2018; 8 years ago
- Location: Greater Iqbal Park, Lahore, Pakistan
- Coordinates: 31.5948°N 74.3119°E
- Type: History museum
- Director: Awais Malik
- Curator: Citizens Archives Pakistan
- Public transit access: Azadi Chowk Lahore Metrobus station
- Website: national-history-museum-museum.business.site

The National History Museum is a digital museum located in Greater Iqbal Park in Lahore, Punjab, Pakistan. A project of the Parks and Horticulture Authority, Lahore (under the Government of Punjab), it was inaugurated on 17 April 2018 by Chief Minister Shehbaz Sharif.

Citizens Archives Pakistan, a not-for-profit organization, was selected to curate the project. It is the first digital museum of Pakistan.

The museum consists of five sections, displaying various aspects of the Pakistan Movement, and the cinema, music, and sport of Pakistan.

== History ==
On 29 January 2014, the Punjab government approved the renovation and landscaping of Minar-e-Pakistan and Circular Gardens area in the 28th meeting of the Provincial Development Working Party. The new park was to be known as the Greater Iqbal Park. After several delays, the first phase of the project was inaugurated on 17 December 2016 by Prime Minister Nawaz Sharif.

The second phase involved the establishment of a national history museum at the northern end of the park. On 17 April 2018, Chief Minister of Punjab Shehbaz Sharif inaugurated the museum. The project was built in a period of 14 months at a cost of Rs. 300 million. For the first few weeks, it hosted public school tours in partnership with the Punjab School Education Department. It was opened for public on 1 July 2018.

== Collections ==
The museum's collections have been divided into five sections, each focusing on a different aspect of Pakistan's culture and history.

=== Hall-1 ===
Hall-1 is devoted to the history of the subcontinent, from the arrival of the East India Company to major events of the Pakistan Movement, including audiovisual displays of the Lahore Resolution (which was passed at Minar-e-Pakistan also located inside the Greater Iqbal Park), the Gandhi-Jinnah talks of 1944, the 3 June Plan, and the Indian Independence Act 1947.

=== Hall-2 ===
This section focuses on the Partition of India, and includes oral accounts of the people who migrated to Pakistan as a part of the largest mass migration in human history, as well as a video display showing the communal riots of 1947.

=== Hall-3 ===
Hall-3 shows the major developments which took place in the nascent country, including the formation of the government and the armed forces. Dioramas of Wagah railway station and post-independence refugee camps are also present. Visitors can also observe the difficulties experienced by the migrants through a 3-D virtual reality display. A photo booth can also be used to take a photograph with the Quaid-e-Azam and other Founding Fathers.

=== Hall-4 ===
The popular culture of Pakistan is displayed in Hall-4, and encompasses Lollywood, the evolution of Pakistani music, and traditional handicrafts. Visitors can also watch clips from famous Pakistani films, and listen to classic songs.

=== Hall-5 ===
This section showcases the sports history of Pakistan. Portraits and busts of famous personalities of the country are also present.
