= Hazuri Bagh Baradari =

Marble pavilion in Lahore, Pakistan

- حضوری باغ بارہ دری
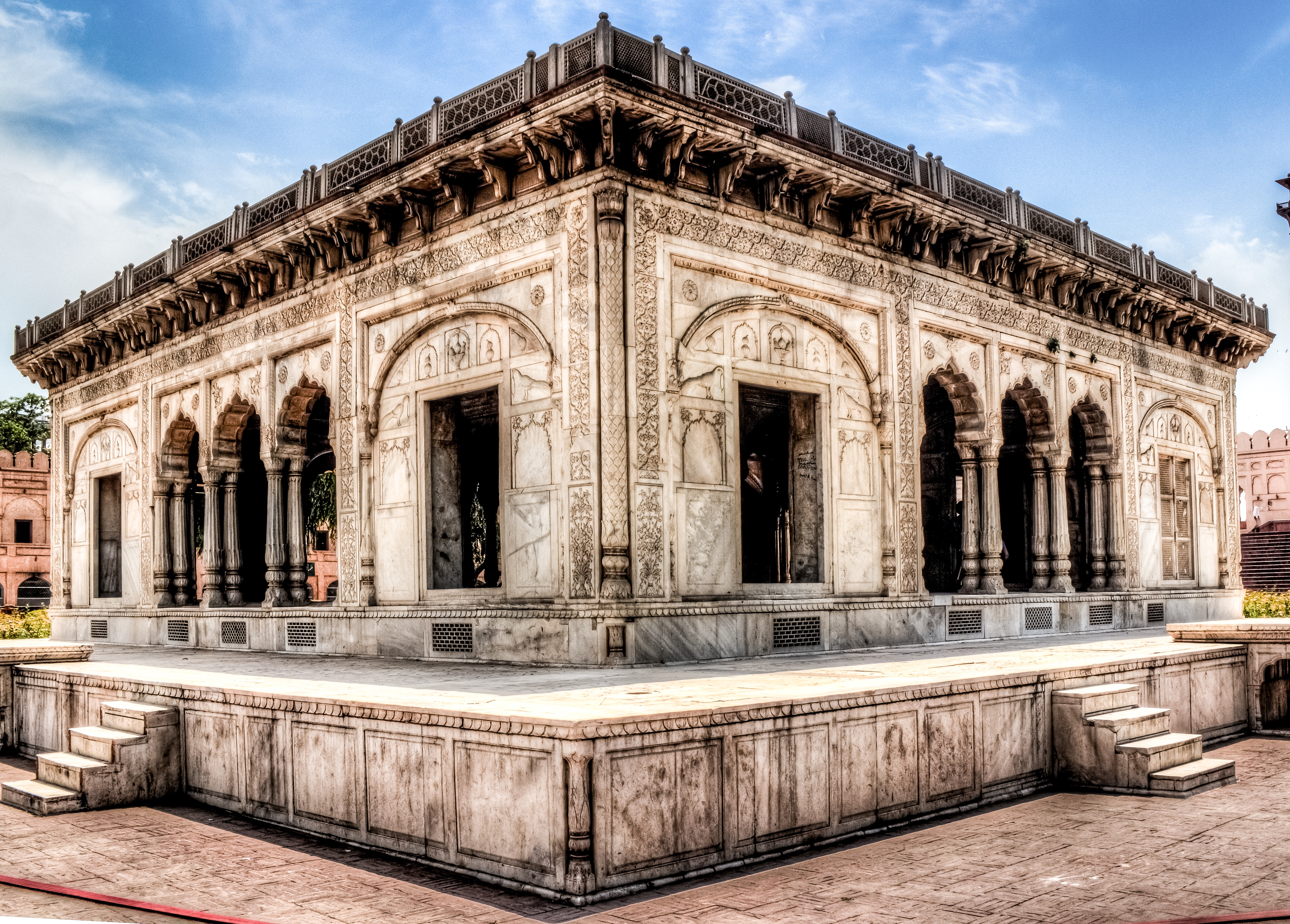
- The baradari is in the centre of the Hazuri Bagh quadrangle, and is directly west of the Lahore Fort's Alamgiri Gate
- Interactive map of Hazuri Bagh Baradari
- Location: Lahore, Punjab, Pakistan
- Coordinates: 31.5884°N 74.3118°E
- Type: Baradari
- Completion date: 1818

The Hazuri Bagh Baradari (Note: Punjabi and Urdu: حضوری باغ بارہ دری) is a white-marble baradari located in the Hazuri Bagh of Lahore, Punjab, Pakistan. It was built under Ranjit Singh, maharaja of Punjab, to celebrate his capture of the Koh-i-Noor diamond from Shuja Shah of the Durrani Empire in 1813. Its construction was completed in 1818.

The pillars support delicate cusped arches. The central area, where Ranjit Singh held court, has a mirrored ceiling. The pavilion consisted of two storeys until it was damaged by lightning in 1932.

== Images ==
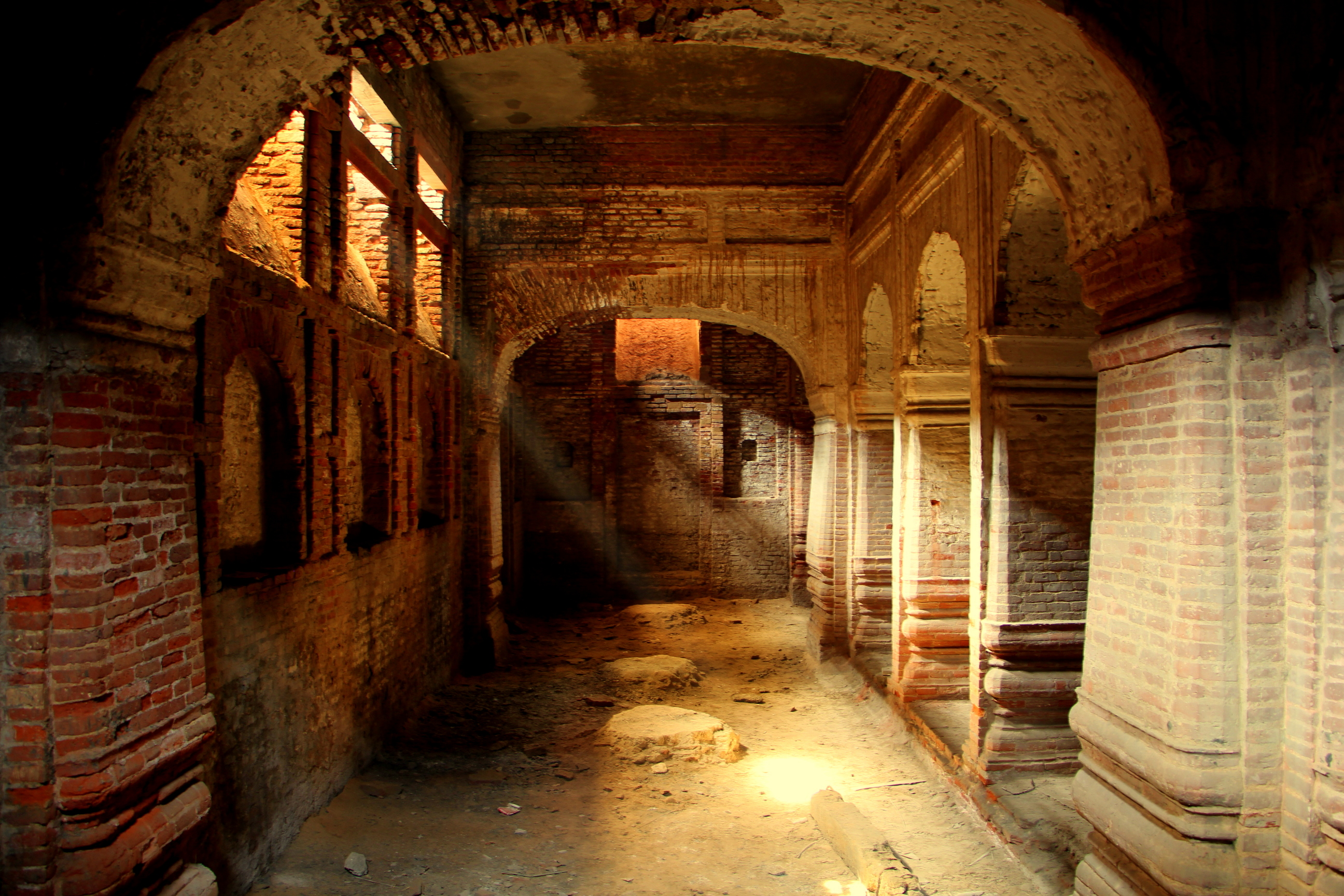
The baradari's basement contains subterranean chambers

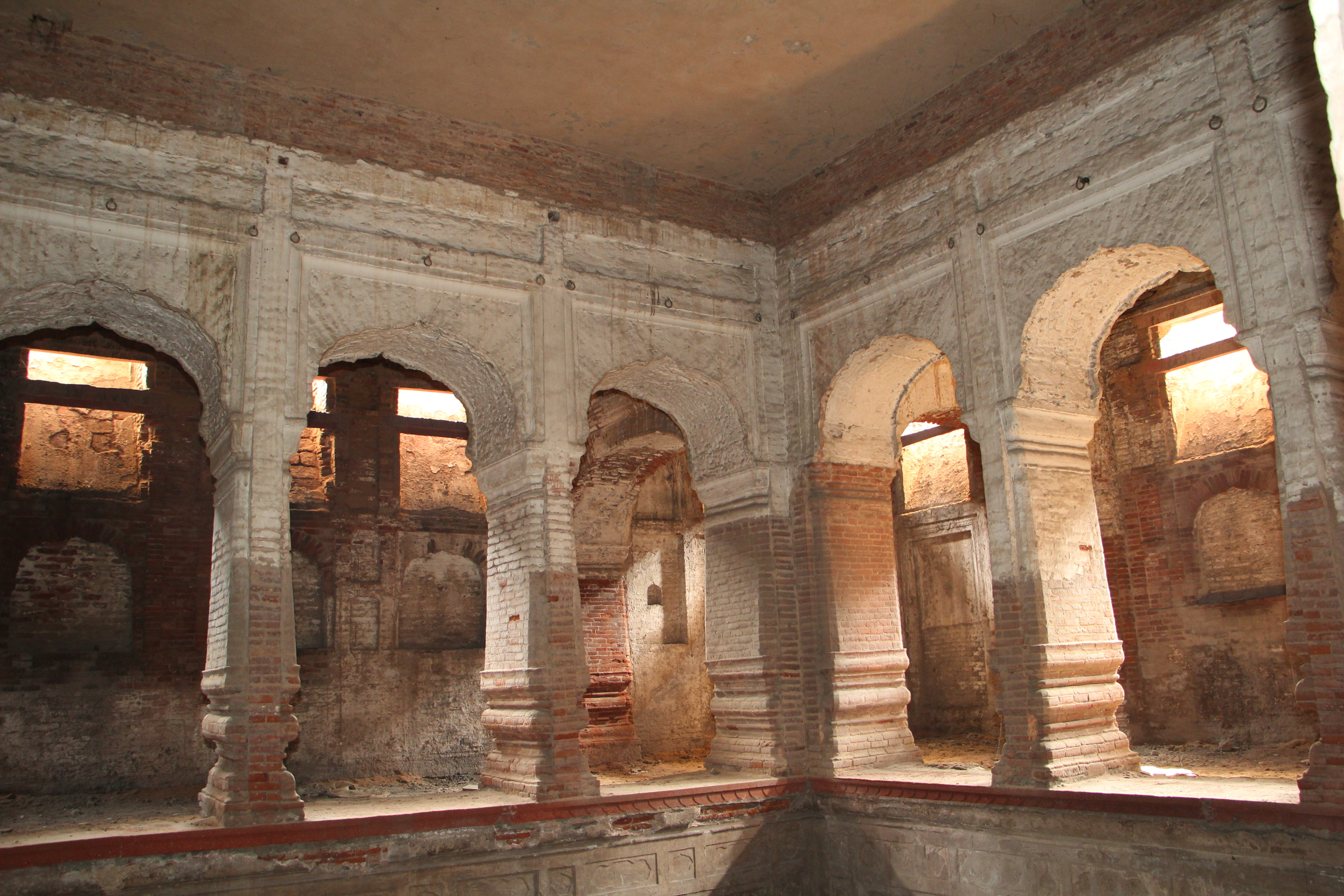
Basement of the structure

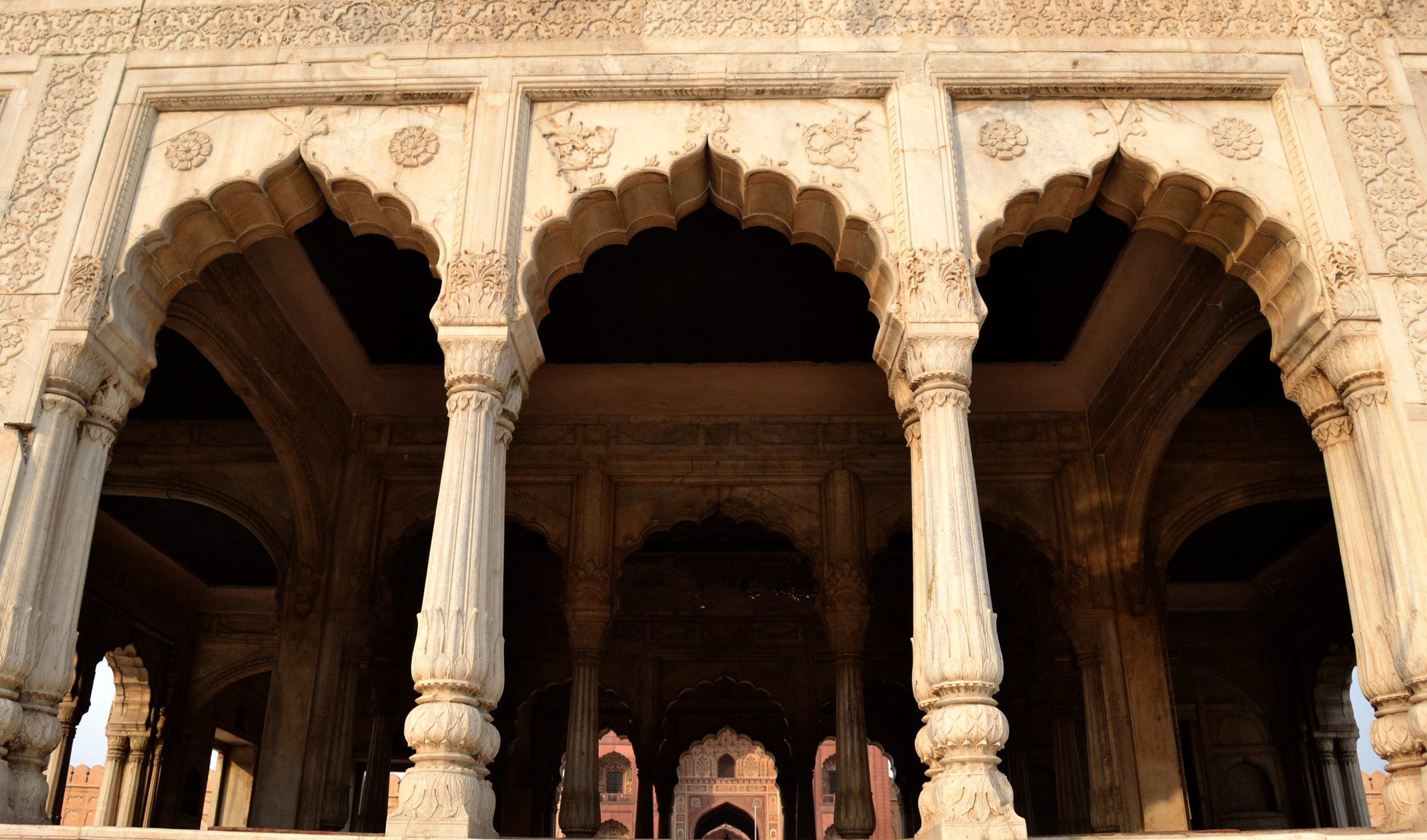
The baradari is accessed through archways

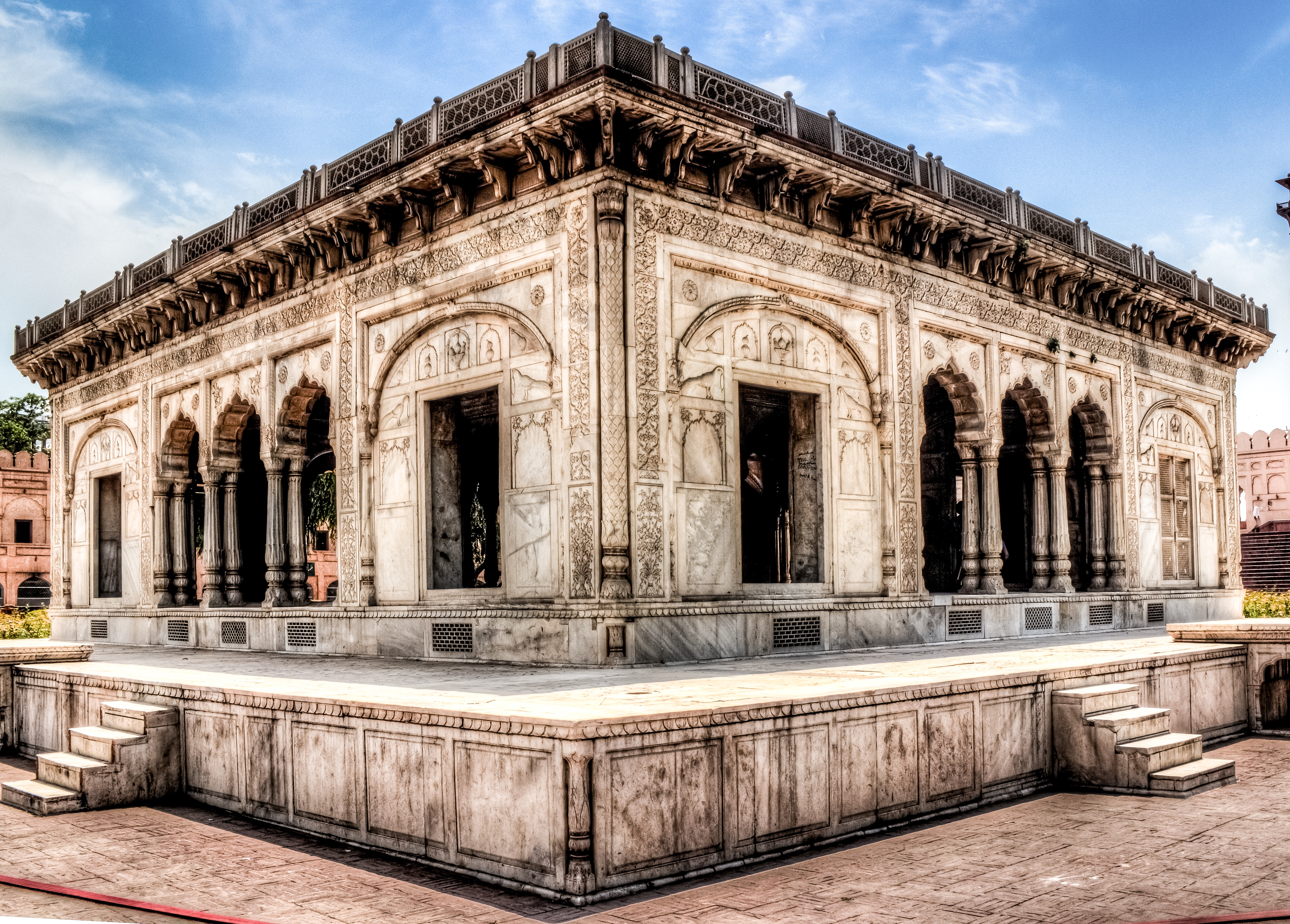

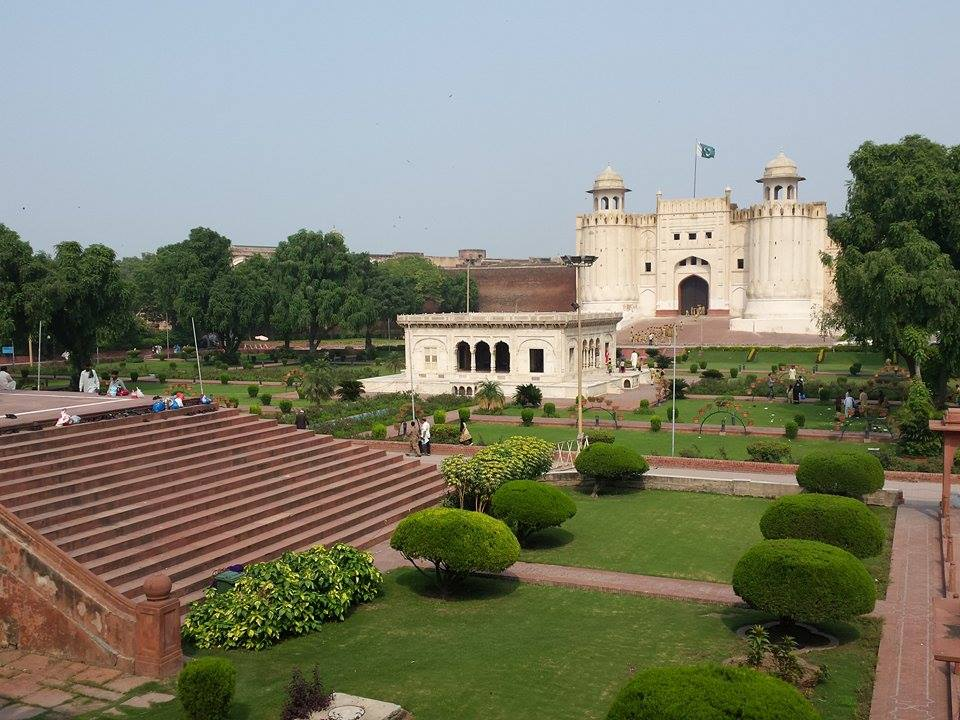
The baradari is in the centre of the Hazuri Bagh quadrangle

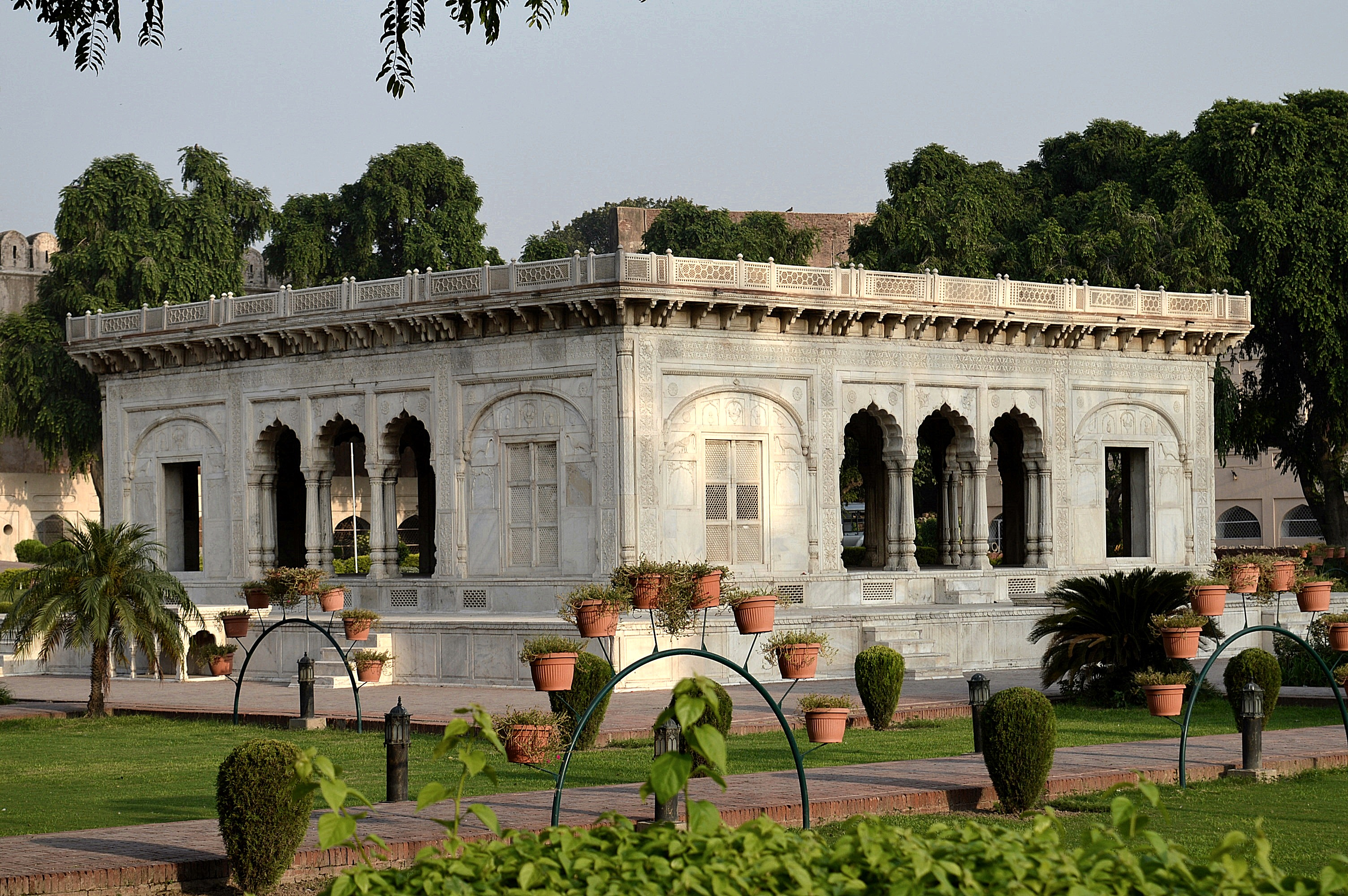

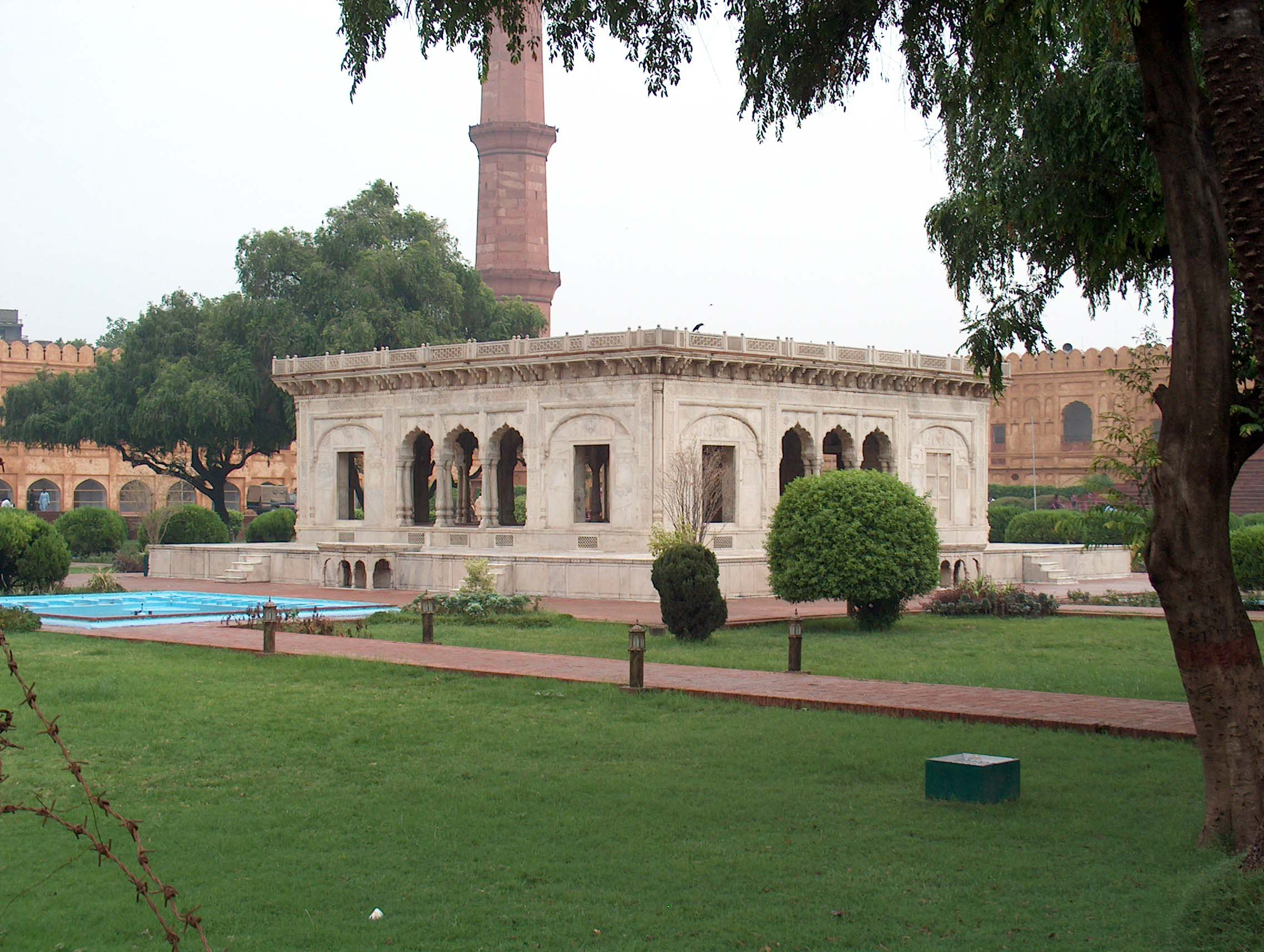
East and north sides of the Baradari

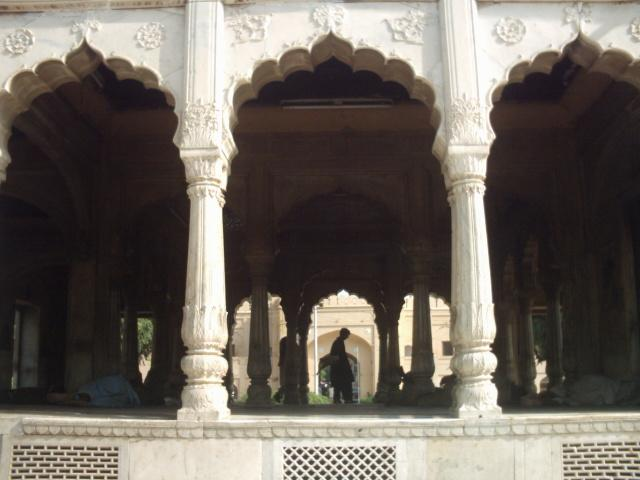
Closeup

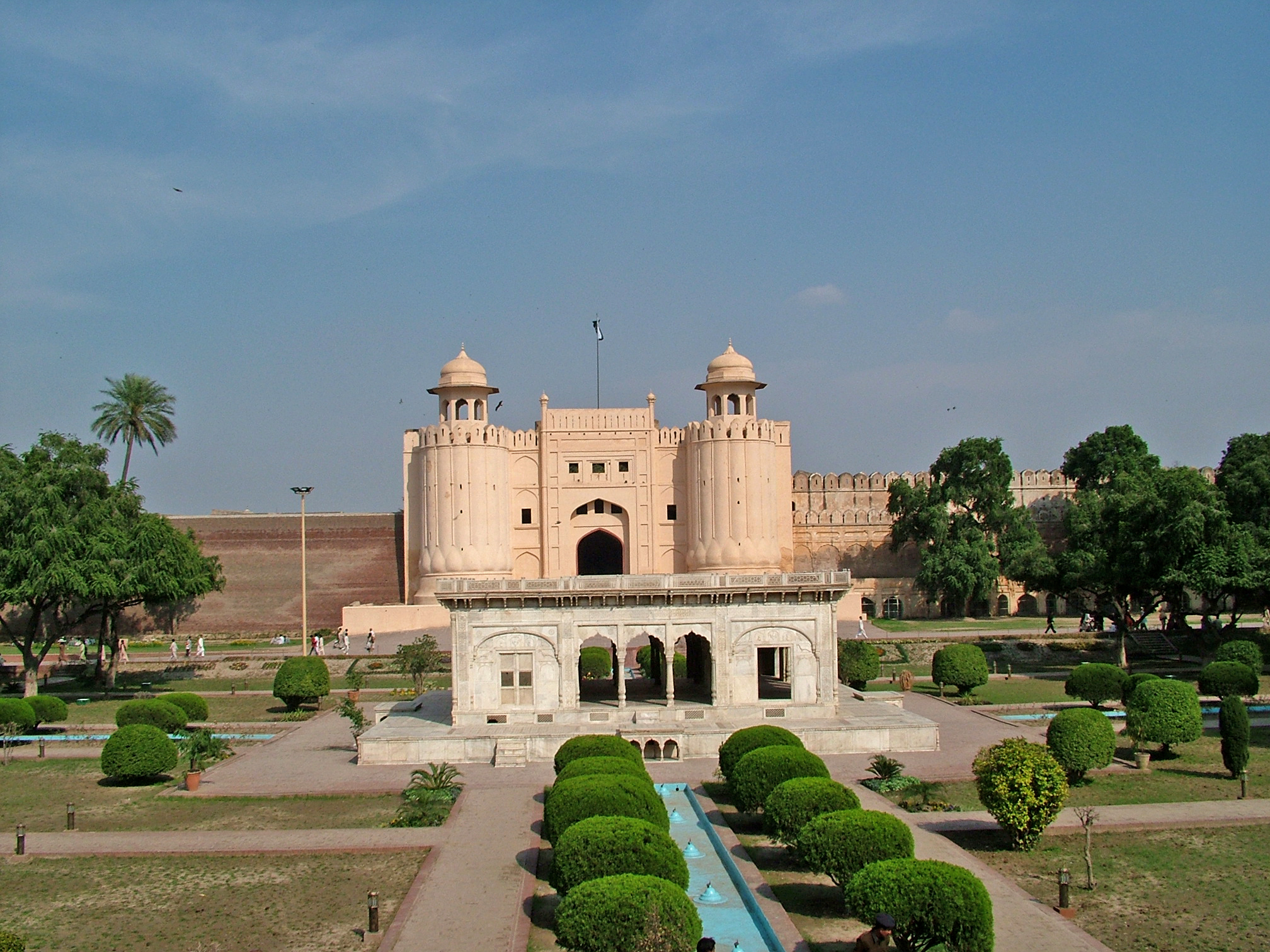
From Hazuri Bagh Baradari, looking towards the Lahore Fort.

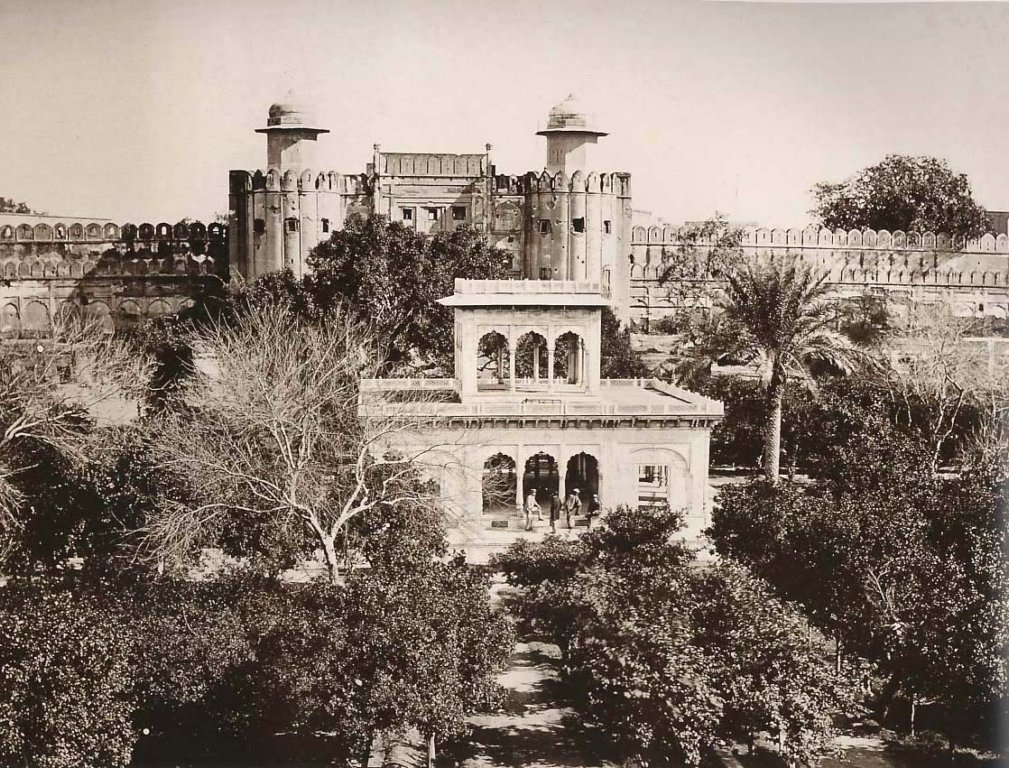
Hazuri Bagh Baradari in 1870, showing the first level pavilion

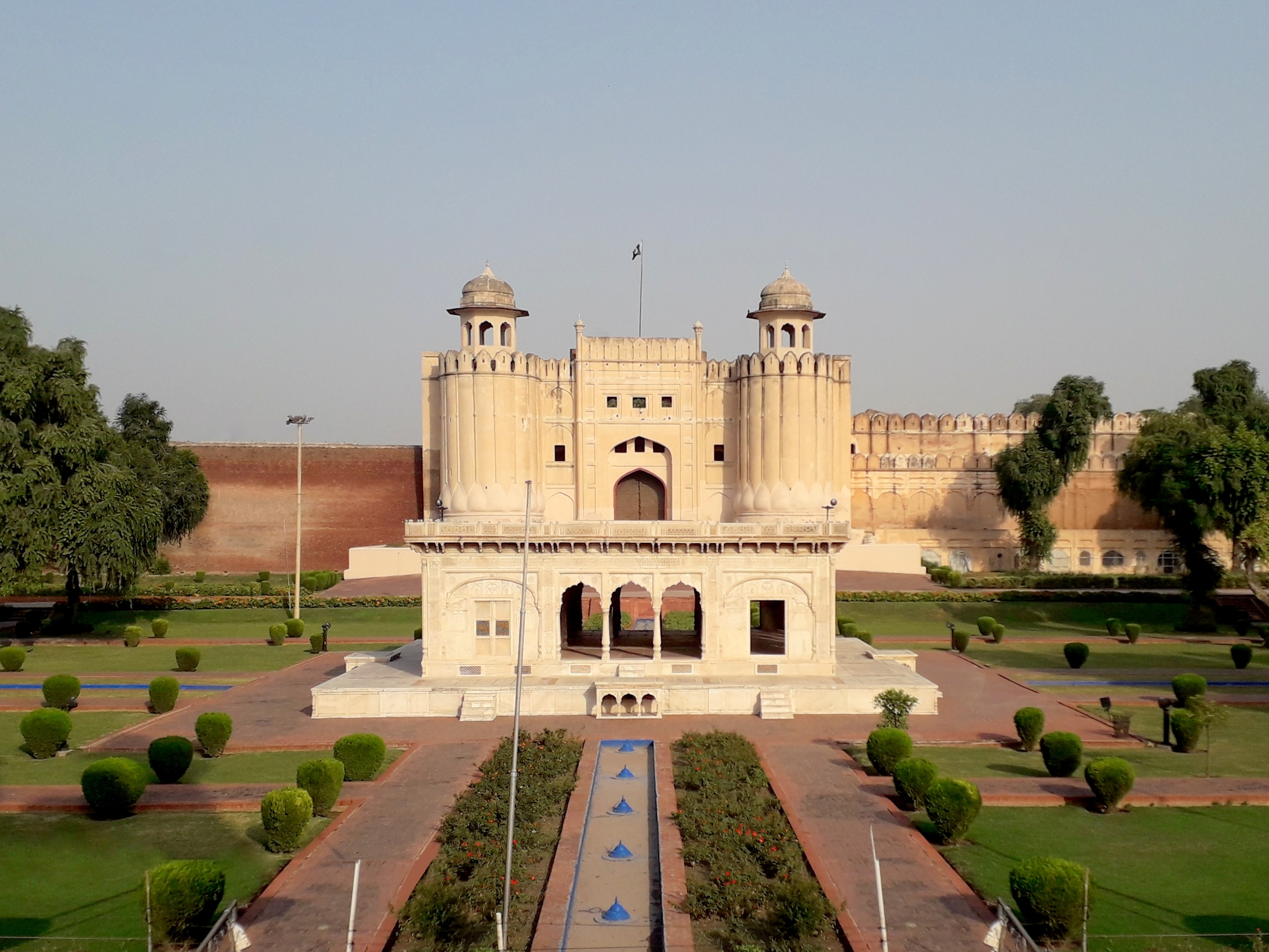
View of the Lahore Fort, from Hazuri Bagh Baradari, 2021
