= Ghazali Saleem Butt =

Pakistani politician (born 1959)

Member of the Provincial Assembly of the Punjab Chairperson/ Chairman Board of Directors PHA, Lahore
- Incumbent
- Assumed office 29 February 2024
- Constituency: PP-146 Lahore-II
- In office 15 August 2018 – 14 January 2023
- Constituency: PP-145 Lahore-II
- In office 29 May 2013 – 31 May 2018
- Constituency: PP-138

Personal details
- Born: 19 March 1959 (age 67) Lahore, Punjab, Pakistan
- Party: PMLN (2013-present)

Ghazali Saleem Butt is a Pakistani politician who was a Member of the Provincial Assembly of the Punjab, from May 2013 to May 2018, from August 2018 to January 2023 and from 8 February 2024 till date.

== Early life and education ==
He was born on 19 March 1959 in Lahore.

He has received matriculation education.

== Political career ==
Ghazali Saleem Butt started his political career in 1998 and contested as Local Bodies Councillor.

He was elected as Naib Nazim in 2001 as a candidate of Pakistan Muslim League (Nawaz) (PML-N) from Union Council # 23.

He was re-elected as Nazim in 2005 as a candidate of Pakistan Muslim League (Nawaz) (PML-N) from the same Union Council. In 2008 he was nominated as Coordinator Shalimar Town.

During this period he served as President of Constituency PP-141 for 13 years.

In appreciation of his working for (PML-N), Chief Minister Punjab Mian Muhammad Shahbaz Sharif appointed him as Political Assistant to CM Punjab in 2011.

He was elected to the Provincial Assembly of the Punjab as a candidate of Pakistan Muslim League (Nawaz) (PML-N) from Constituency PP-138 (Lahore-II) in 2013 Pakistani general election.

He remained Member Board of Directors Sheikh Zaid Al-Nahyan Hospital Lahore from 2017-2018.

Ghazali Saleem Butt took oath on August 15, 2018.

He was re-elected to Provincial Assembly of the Punjab as a candidate of PML-N from Constituency PP-145 (Lahore-II) in the 2018 Pakistani general election.

He was elected 3rd time to Provincial Assembly of the Punjab as a candidate of PML-N from Constituency PP-146 (Lahore-II) in the 2024 Pakistani general election.

On 23 August he was appointed Chairperson/Chairman Board of Directors Parks & Horticulture Authority Lahore.
