= Hazuri Bagh =

Sikh-era garden in Lahore, Punjab, Pakistan

Coordinates: 31°35′18″N 74°18′42″E

- حضوری باغ
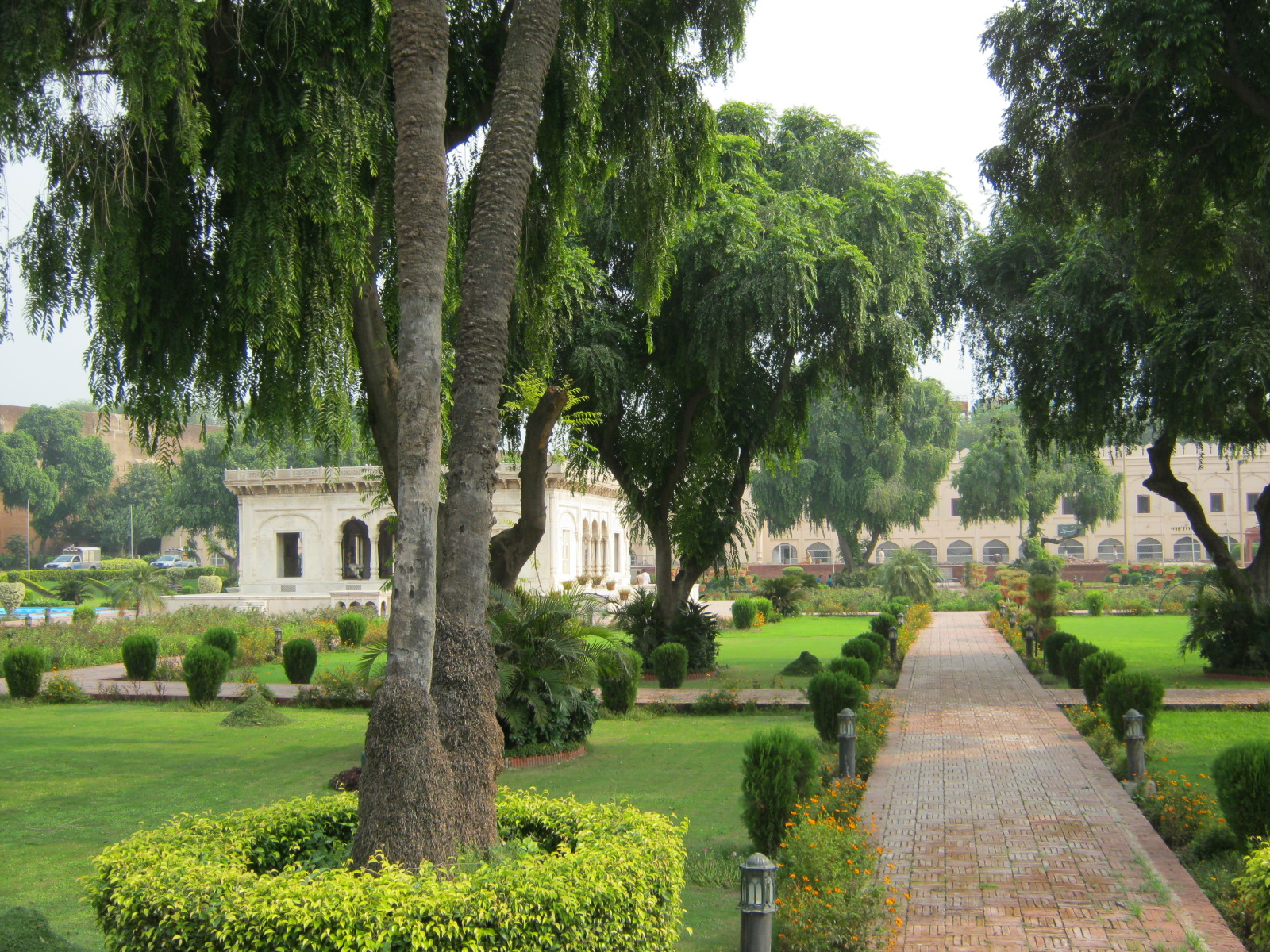
- The Hazuri Bagh Baradari is in the centre of the quadrangle

- Location within Lahore Location within Pakistan
- Location: Lahore, Pakistan

Hazuri Bagh (Urdu: حضوری باغ Persian: باغ حضوری) is a garden in Lahore, Punjab, Pakistan, bounded by the Lahore Fort to the east, Badshahi Mosque to the west, the Samadhi of Ranjit Singh to the north, and the Roshnai Gate to the south. The garden was built during the reign of Ranjit Singh, in the style of Mughal gardens. In the centre of the garden stands the Hazuri Bagh Baradari, built by Ranjit Singh in 1818 to celebrate his capture of the Koh-i-Noor diamond from Shuja Shah Durrani in 1813. The Serai Alamgiri caravanserai formerly stood where Hazuri Bagh is now located.

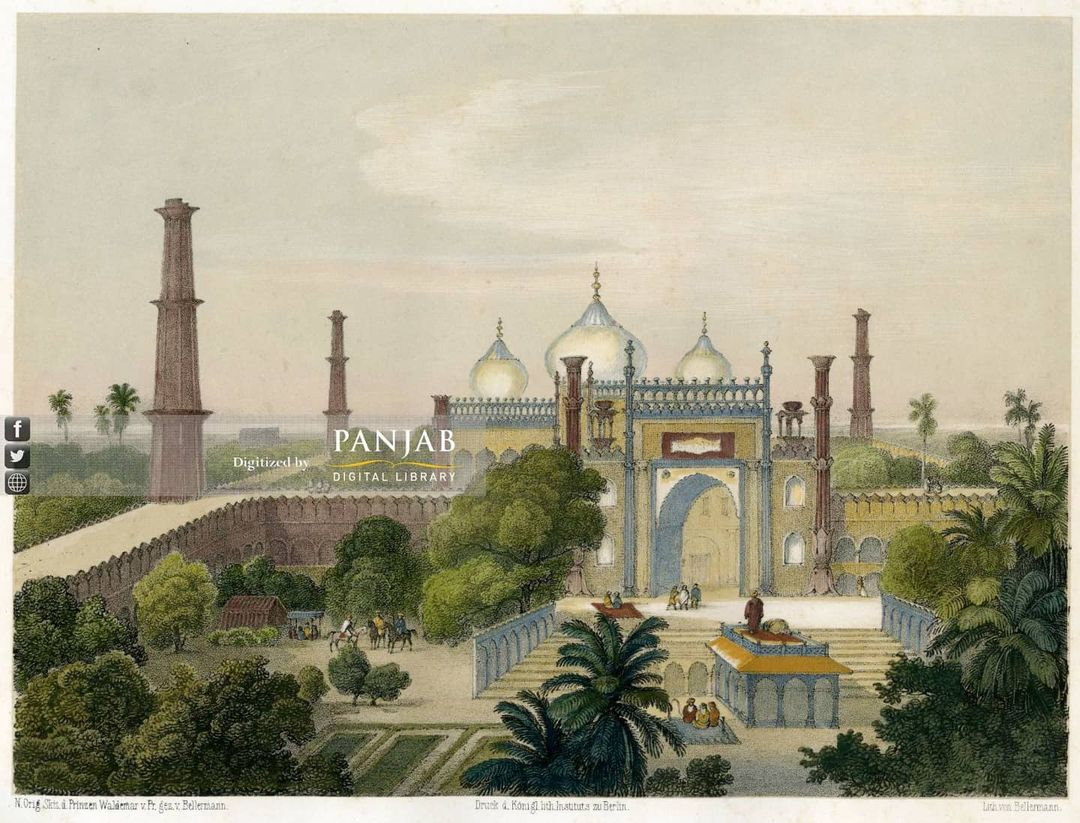
An old Lithograph of Hazuri Bagh. Digitized by the Panjab Digital Library.

== History ==
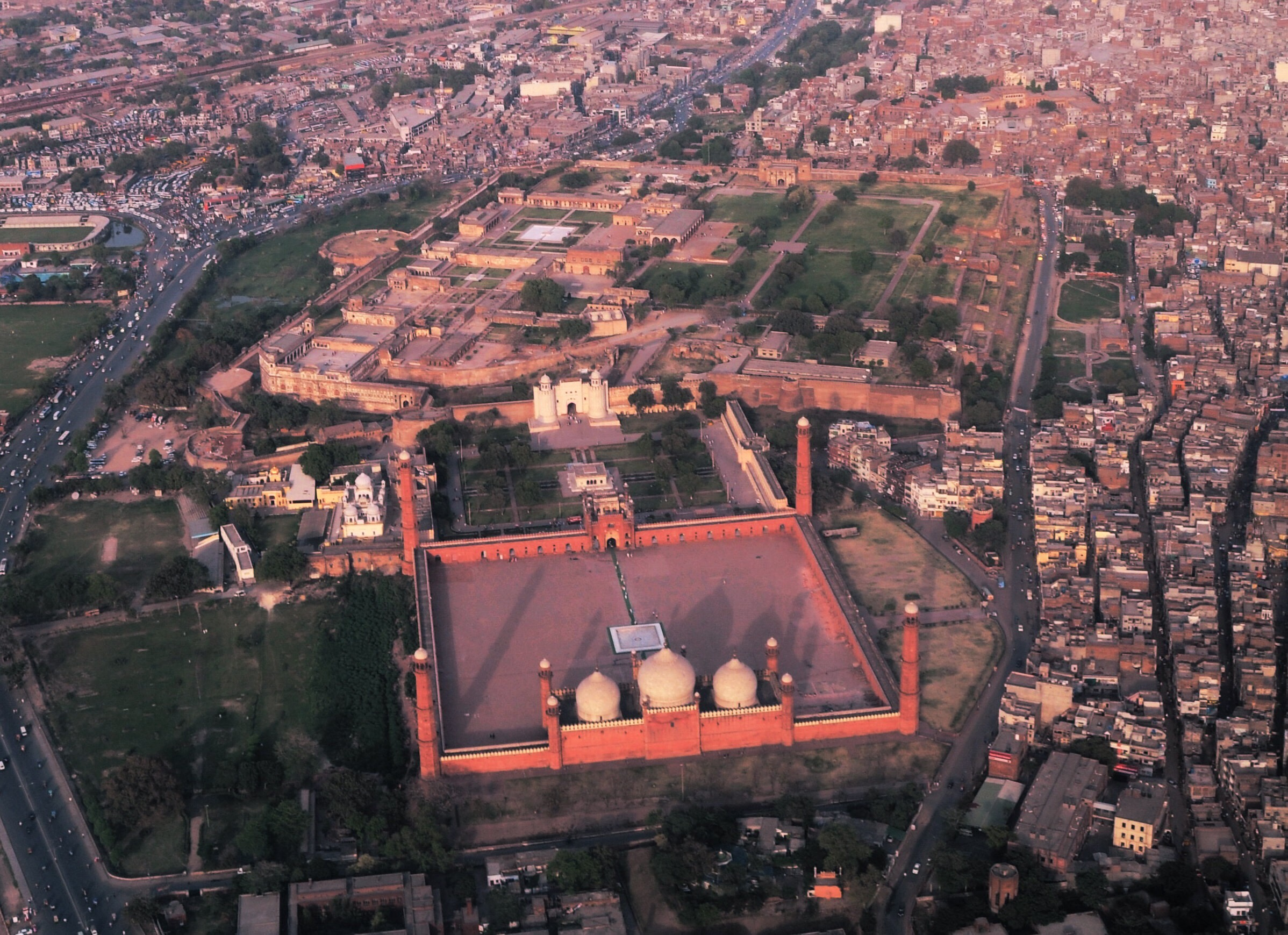
Hazuri Bagh is at the centre of an ensemble of monuments including the Badshahi Mosque, Lahore Fort, Roshnai Gate, and the Samadhi of Ranjit Singh

The Hazuri Bagh garden was planned and built under the supervision of Faqir Azizuddin in the traditional Mughal style layout. After its completion, it is said, Ranjit Singh, at the suggestion of Khushal Singh Jamadar, ordered that marble vandalized from various mausoleums of Lahore be used to construct a baradari (pavilion) here. This task was given to Khalifa Nooruddin. Elegant carved marble pillars support the baradari's delicate cusped arches. The central area, where Ranjit Singh held court, has a mirrored ceiling. Both the garden and the baradari, originally a 13.7 meter ( 45 ft), three-storey square with a basement approached by fifteen steps, suffered extensive damage during the Sikh wars and was only reclaimed and laid out according to the original plan during the British period. On 19 July 1932, the top story collapsed and was never rebuilt or restored. The tomb of Muhammad Iqbal, completed in 1951, as well as of Sikandar Hayat Khan, the last Premier of the Punjab, lies across from the garden outside of the Badshahi Mosque.

Every Sunday afternoon, people gather in the garden to hear story tellers recite traditional Punjabi Qisse, such as Heer Ranjha and Sassi Punnun, and other Punjabi Sufi poetic pieces.

== Gallery ==
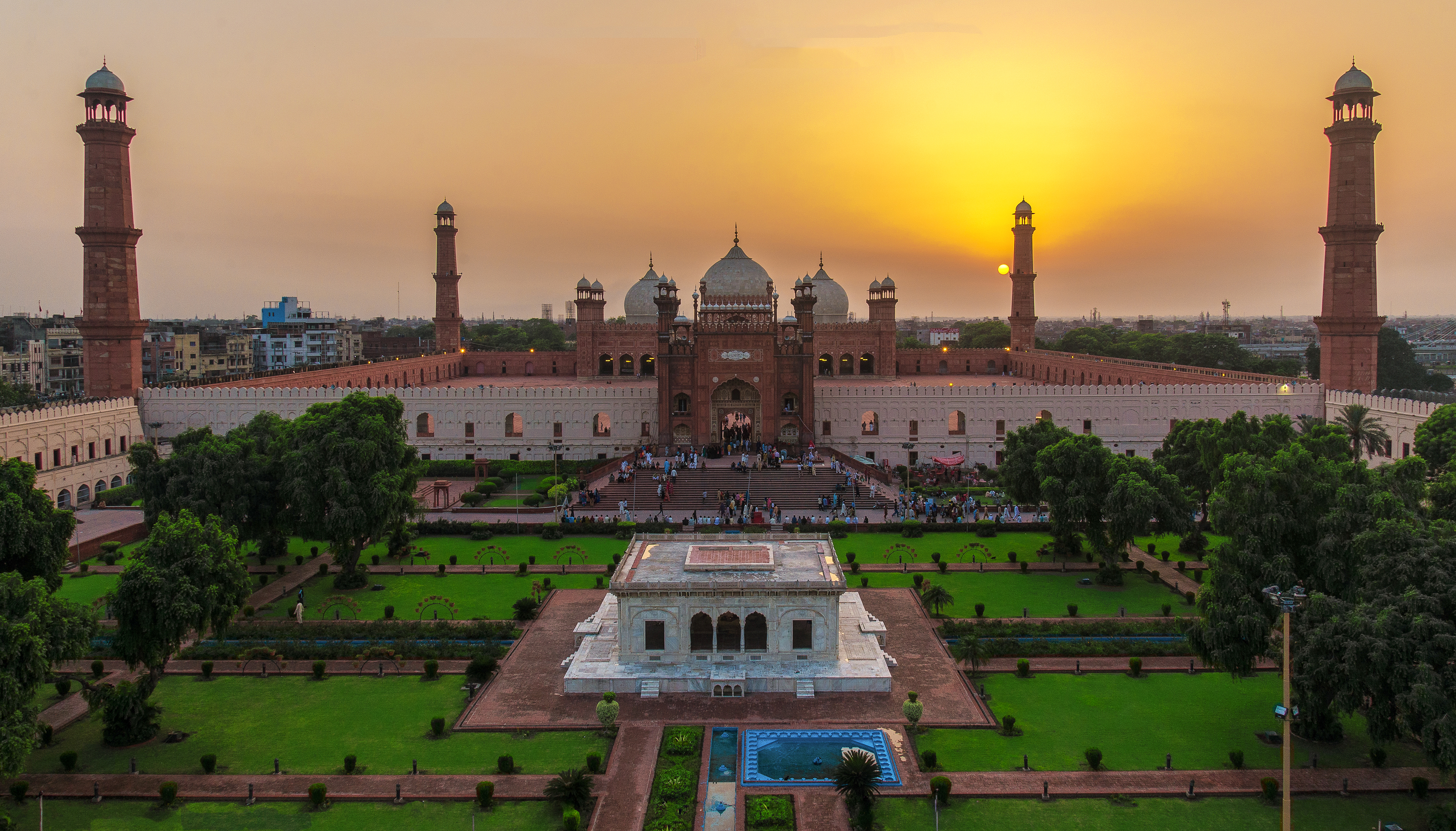
Hazuri Bagh is at the entryway of Badshahi Mosque

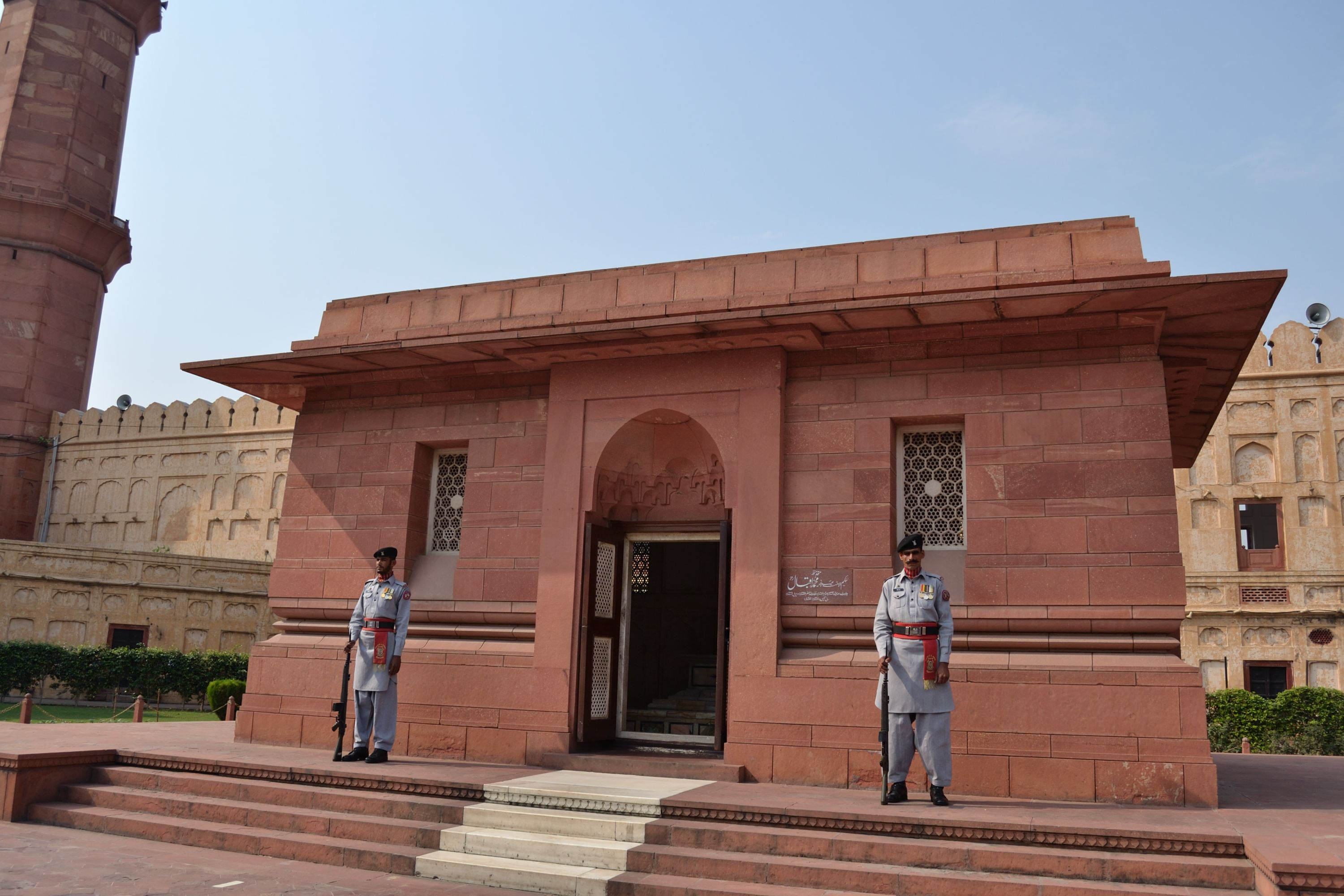
The Tomb of Allama Iqbal is located within the Hazuri Bagh

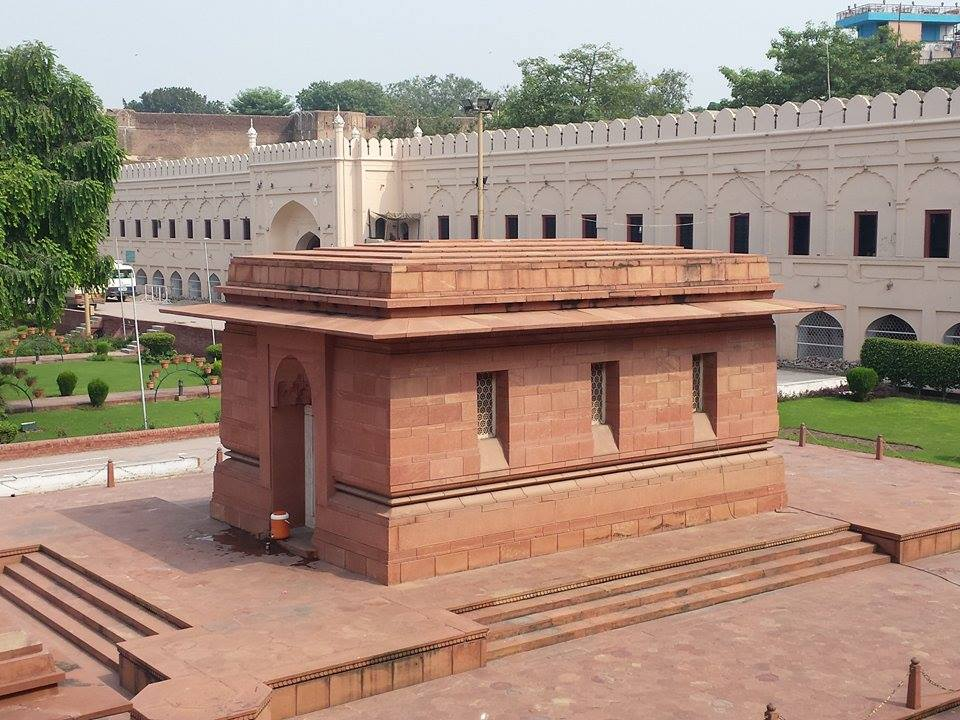

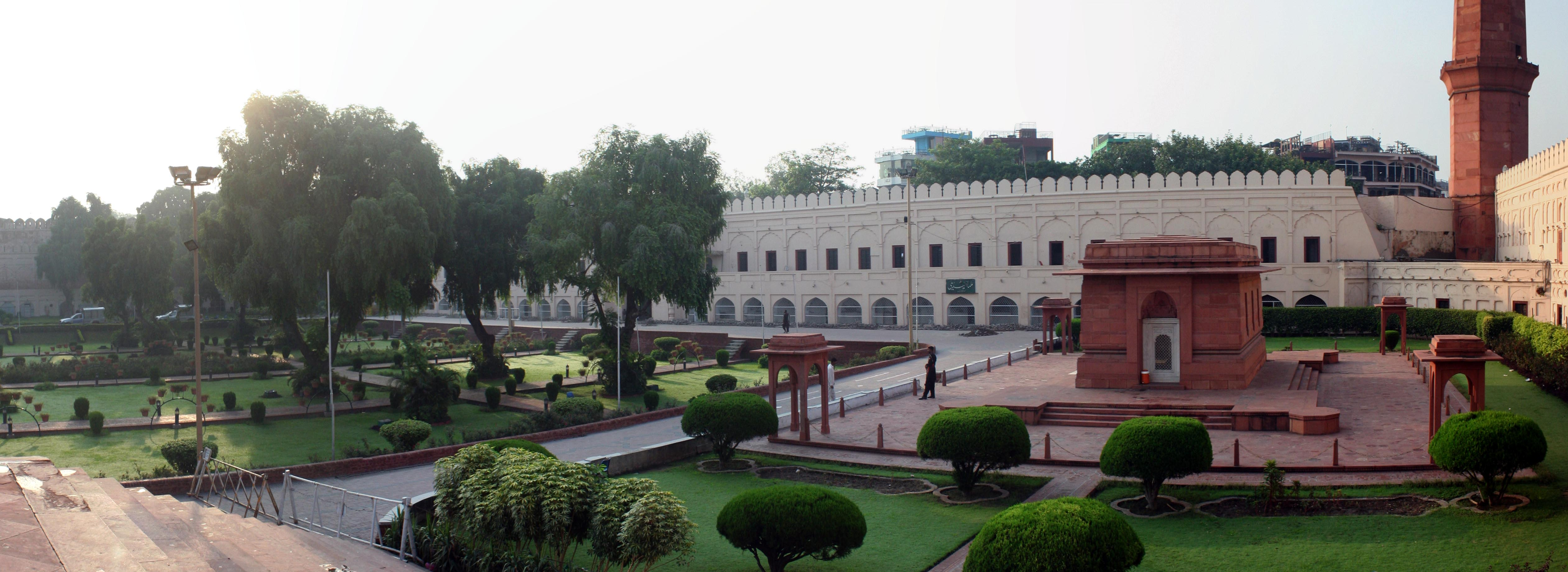
Iqbal's tomb and the Hazuri Bagh

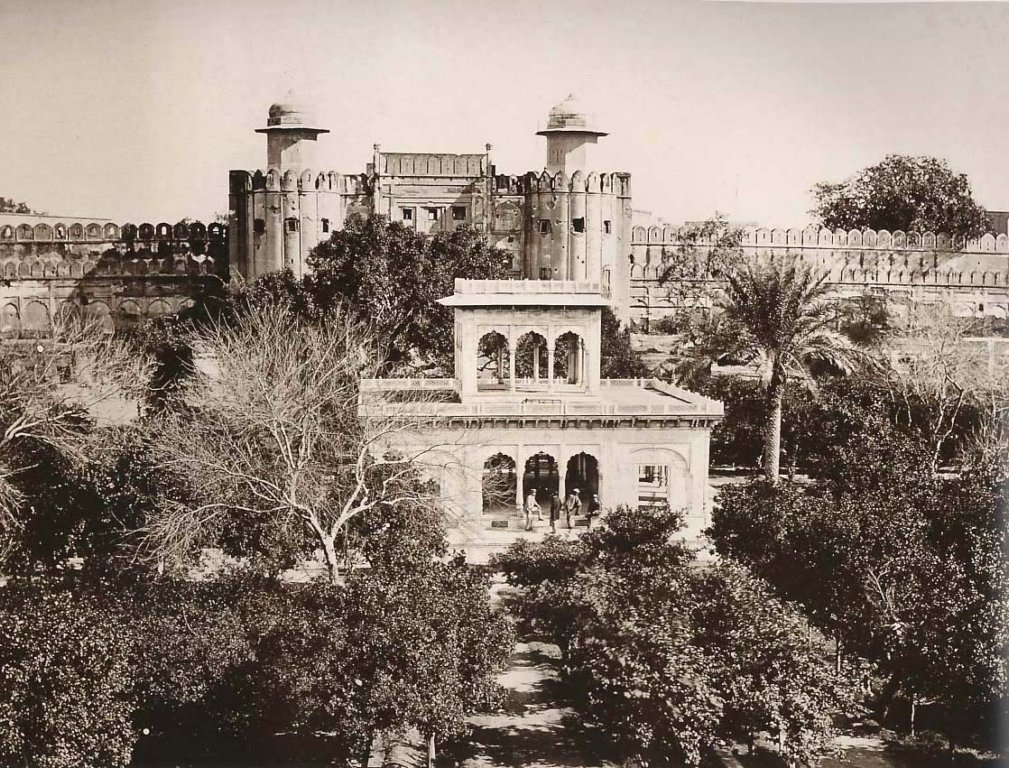
Hazuri bagh pavilion in 1870, with Lahore Fort in background

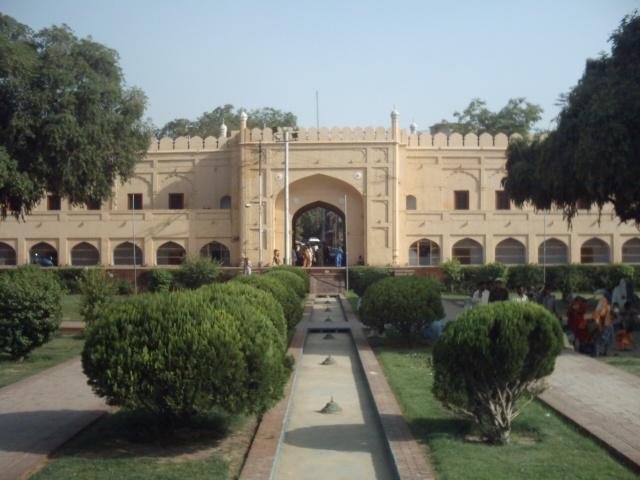
South section, with Roshnai Gate in background

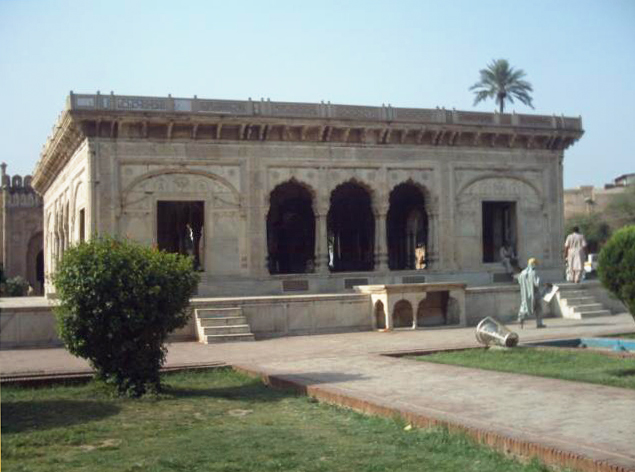
Hazuri Bagh Baradari

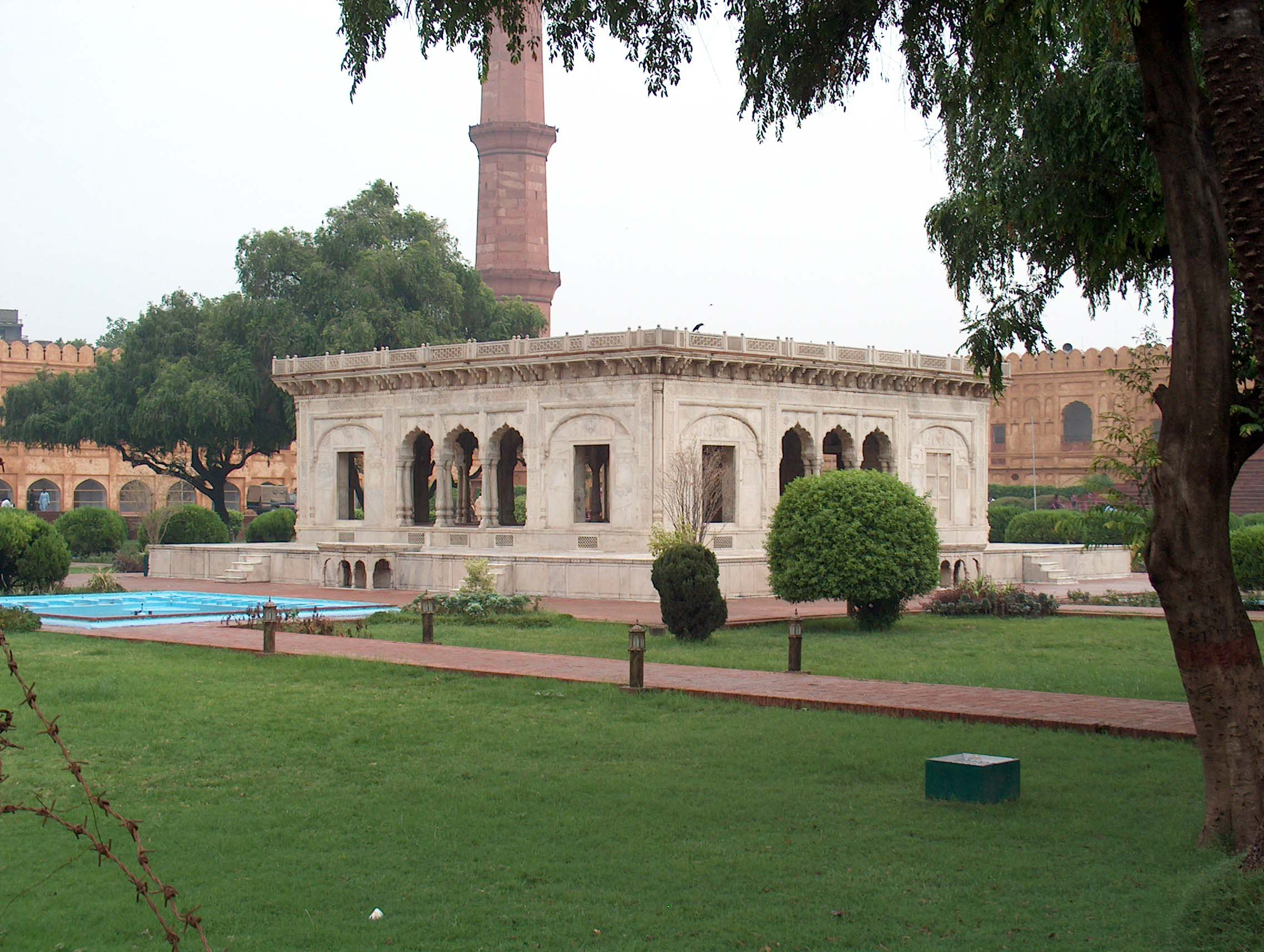
Baradari with Badshahi Mosque in background

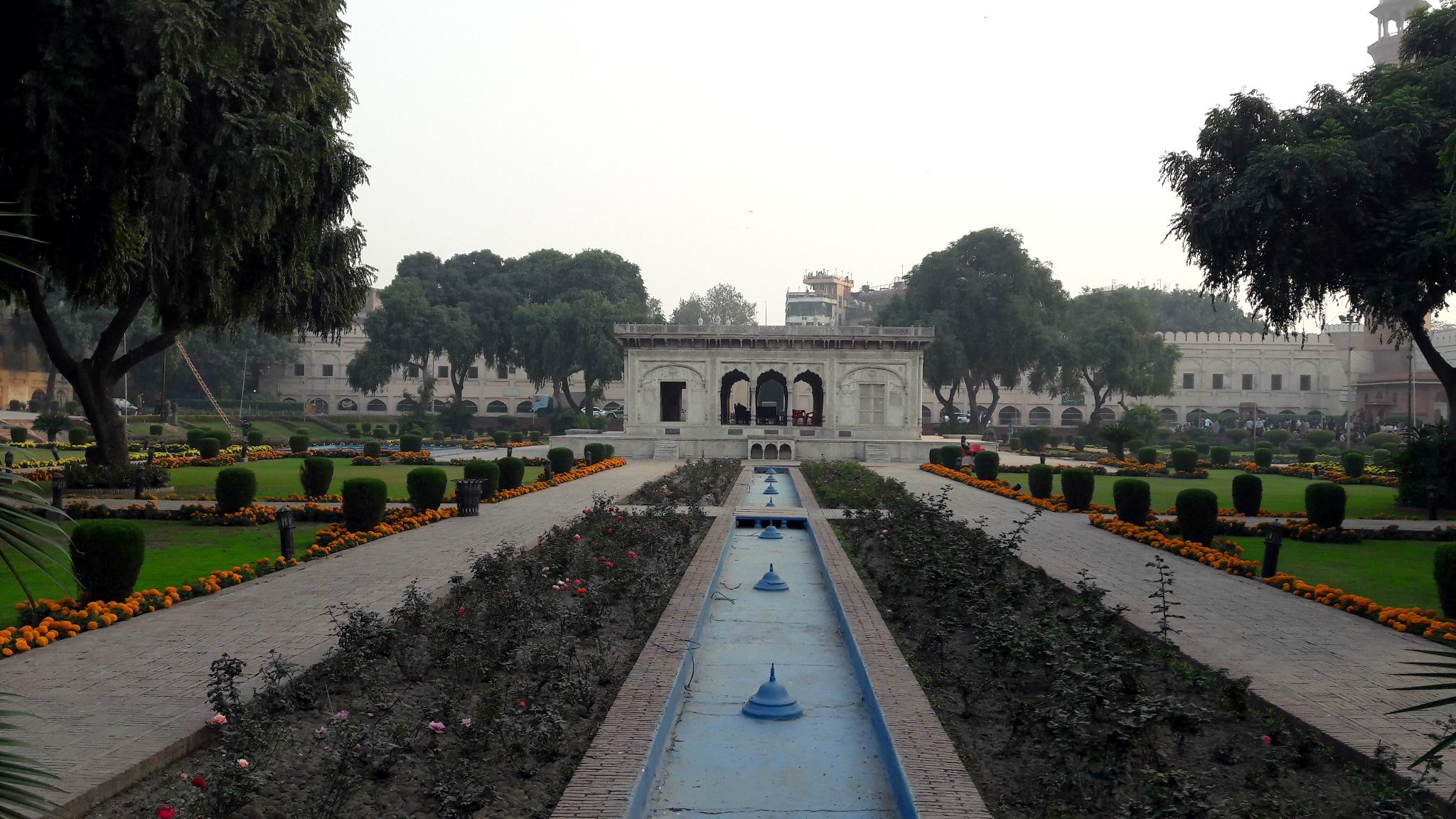
Hazuri Bagh

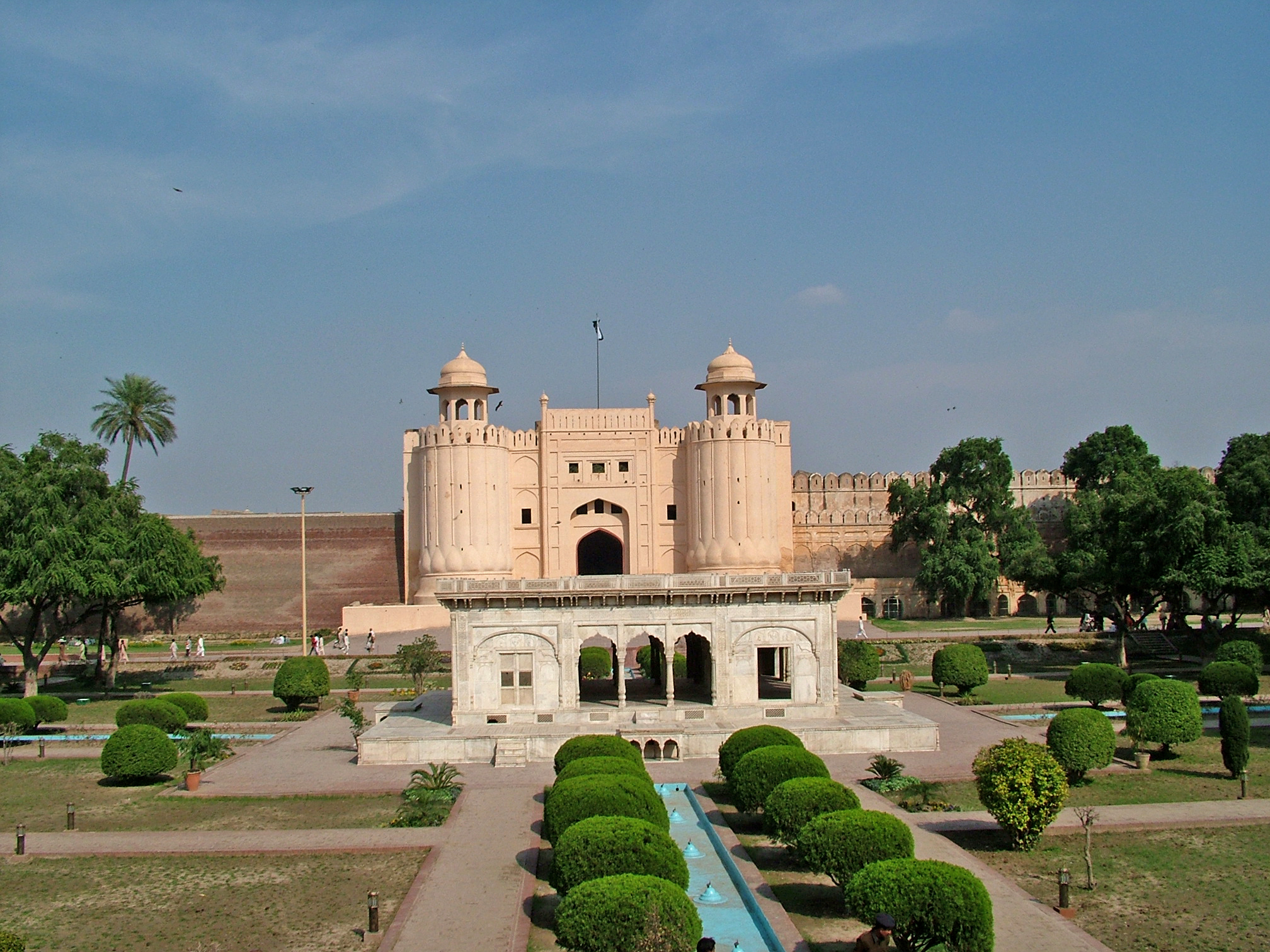
Hazuri Bagh Baradari with Lahore Fort in the background, 2005.

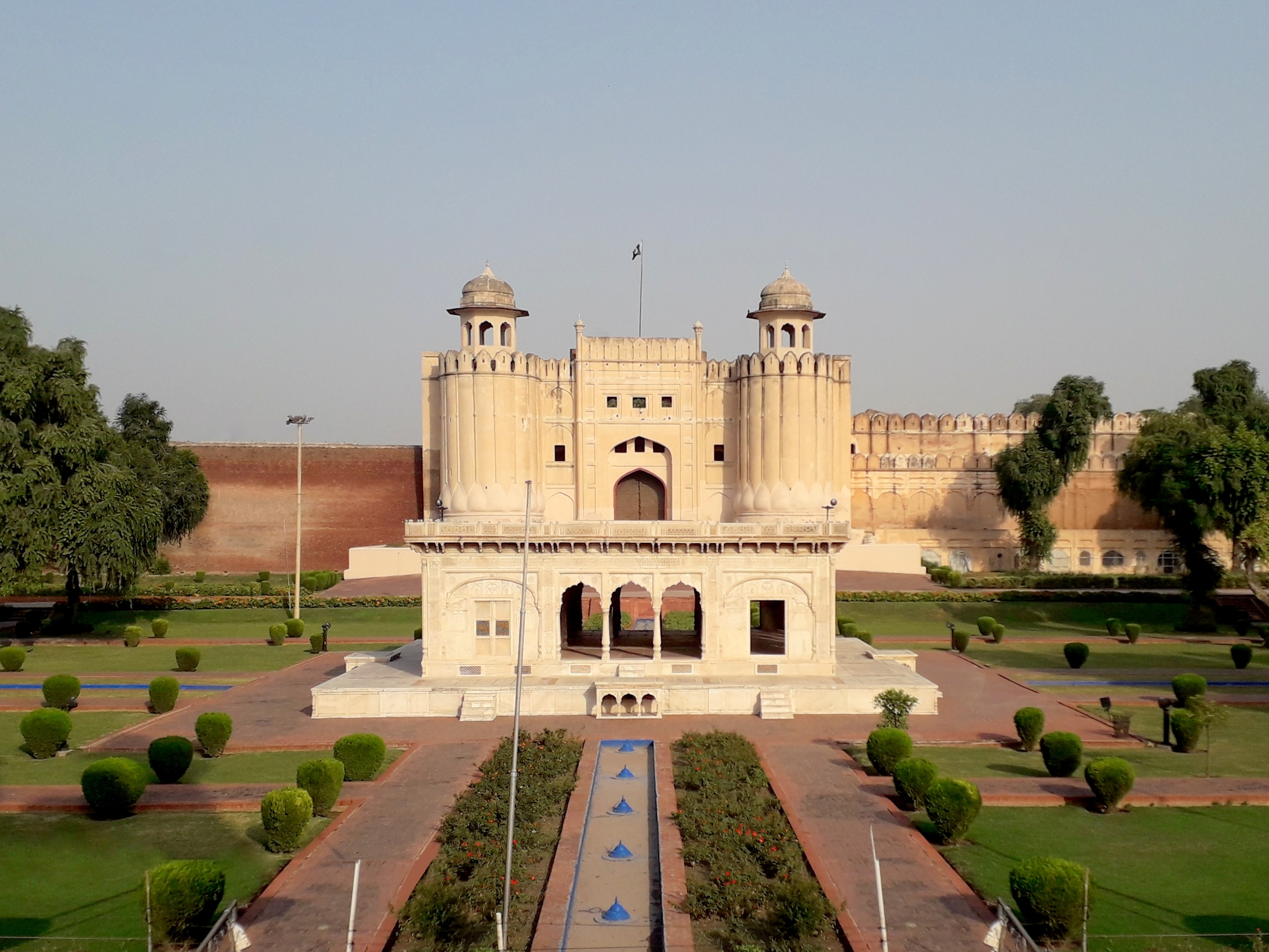
Hazuri Bagh Baradari with Lahore Fort in the background, 2021.

== See also ==
- List of parks and gardens in Lahore
- List of parks and gardens in Pakistan
- List of gardens
- Naulakha pavilion
- Sheesh Mahal
- List of parks and gardens in Karachi
