= Parks and Horticulture Authority =

Government agency responsible for parks Lahore

Parks & Horticulture Authority
- Abbreviation: PHA
- Formation: September 1998; 28 years ago
- Founded at: Lahore, Punjab, Pakistan
- Location: Gate No-4 Jillani Park, 2 Jail Rd, Lahore 54000
- Region served: Punjab, Pakistan
- Chairman of PHA: Ghazali Saleem Butt
- Website: www.pha.gop.pk

Parks and Horticulture Authority (PHA) (Urdu: ادارہ باغات و باغبانی) is a Lahore District government body which controls the parks and plantings in Lahore. It works with the Lahore Development Authority in many ways. It maintains all the public parks and horticulture in Lahore. It was established in September 1998. It is a merged body of horticulture departments in Lahore Development Authority and Metropolitan Corporation Lahore.

In August 2024, Ghazali Saleem Butt, member of the Provincial Assembly of the Punjab was appointed as chairperson/chairman PHA Lahore.

== See also ==
- List of parks and gardens in Lahore
