= Azadi Chowk =

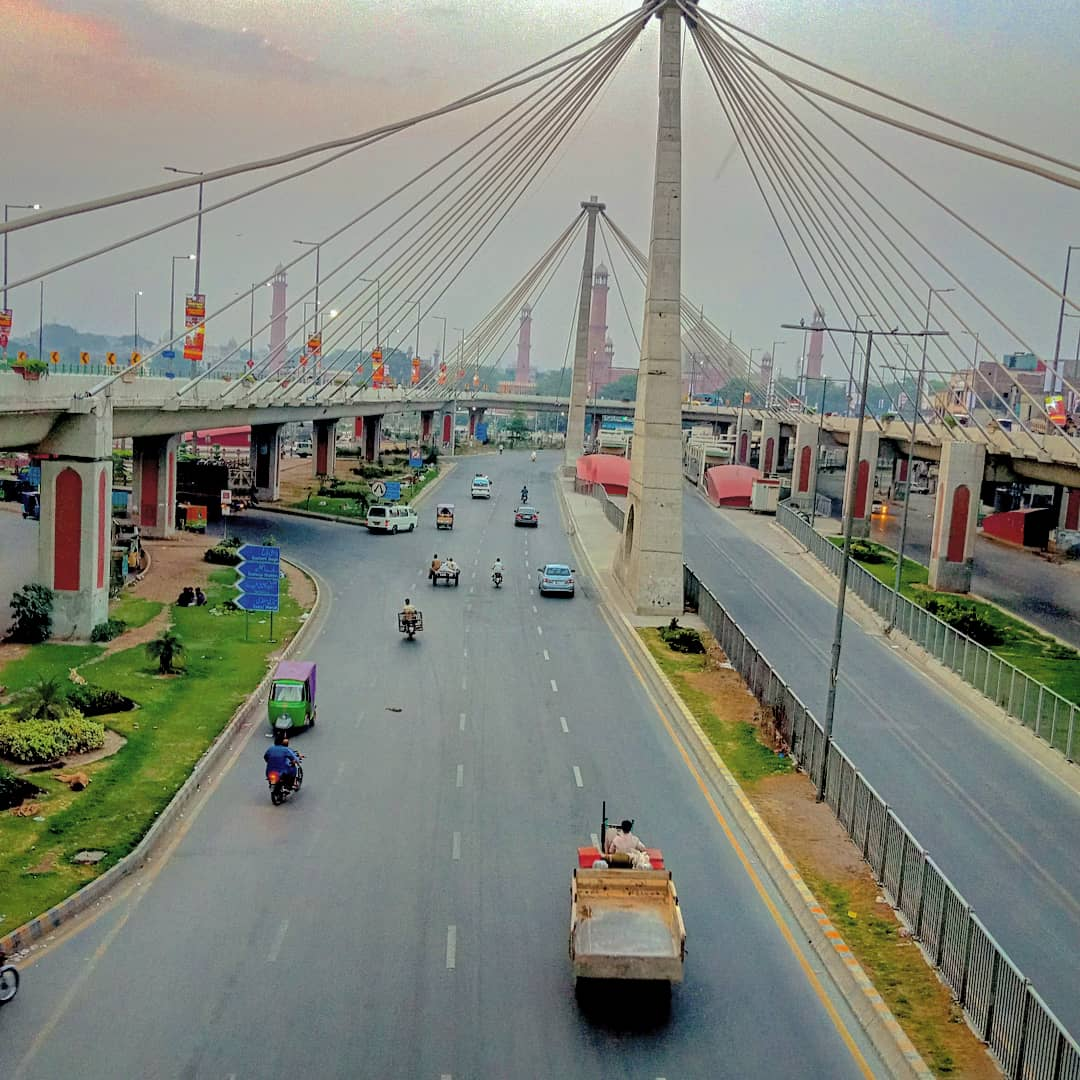
The Azadi Chowk is located near the Badshahi Mosque.

Azadi Chowk (Urdu: آزادی چوک, "Liberty Interchange"; also known as Minar-e-Pakistan Chowk, "Minar-e-Pakistan Interchange"), is a large elevated roundabout in Lahore, capital of Punjab, Pakistan. Azadi Chowk is near the Minar-e-Pakistan monument, where the ceremony of the Pakistan Resolution was conducted, resulting in the creation of Pakistan. As one of the Lahore's major entry points, the interchange is usually busy.

Statistics

Location	Lahore
Construction cost	PKR 3200 Million
Client	Lahore Development Authority, Government of Punjab
Consultant	Nespak
Contractor	Habib Construction Services Limited
