= Gurdwara Darbar Sahib Kartarpur =

Sikh temple in Kartarpur, Pakistan

Gurdwara Darbar Sahib Kartarpur گُردُوارہ دربار صاحِب کرتارپور ਗੁਰਦੁਆਰਾ ਦਰਬਾਰ ਸਾਹਿਬ ਕਰਤਾਰਪੁਰ
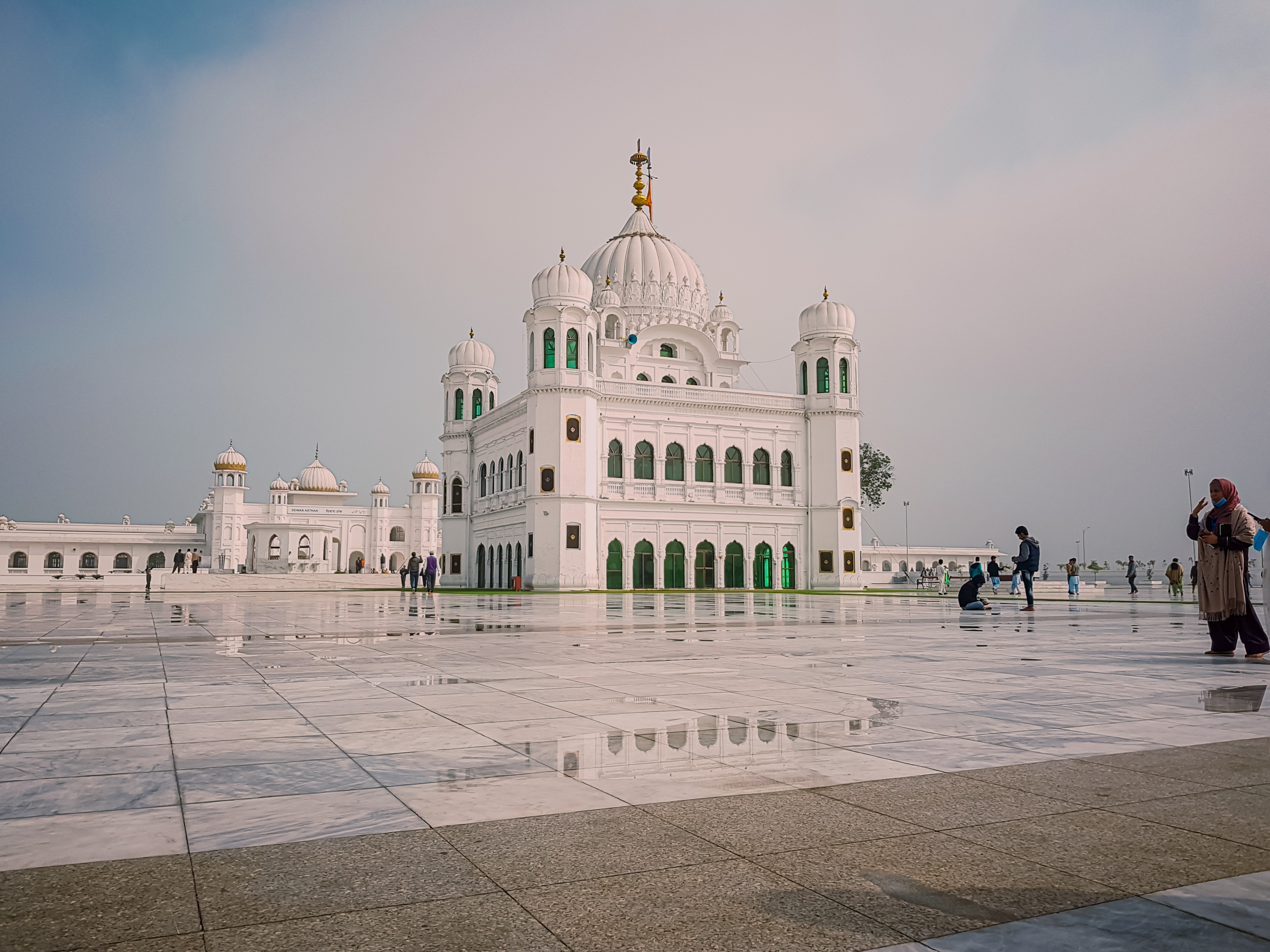
- Darbar Sahib, gurdwara commemorating Guru Nanak, in Kartarpur Kartarpur and Dera Baba Nanak across the India–Pakistan border in Punjab

- Location within Punjab, Pakistan Location within Pakistan

General information
- Type: Gurdwara
- Architectural style: Sikh architecture
- Location: Kartarpur, Punjab, Pakistan
- Coordinates: 32.08735°N 75.01658°E
- Construction started: 1925

Website
- www.etpb.gov.pk/kartarpur-corridor

Gurdwara Darbar Sahib Kartarpur, also called Kartarpur Sahib, is a gurdwara in Kartarpur, Punjab, Pakistan. Kartarpur, a small town beside the Ravi River in the Shakargarh Tehsil of Narowal District, stands on the historic site where Guru Nanak, the founder of Sikhism, settled and assembled the Sikh community after his missionary travels. Nanak lived there for 18 years until his death in 1539. It is one of the holiest sites in Sikhism.

The gurdwara is also notable for its location near the border between Pakistan and India. The shrine is visible from the Indian side of the border. Indian Sikhs gather in large numbers on Gurpurab (Parkash Purab of Guru Nanak Dev Ji) to perform darshan, or sacred viewing of the site, from the Indian side of the border. The Kartarpur Corridor was opened by then Pakistani prime minister Imran Khan and Indian prime minister Narendra Modi on 9 November 2019, just days before the 550th birth anniversary of Guru Nanak. This historic moment officially allowed Indian Sikh pilgrims rare visa-free access to the site in Pakistan. It is also claimed to be the largest gurdwara in the world.

== History ==
Guru Nanak spent his final years in Kartarpur, where he established a community and preached the principles of 'Kirit Karni' (honest labor), 'Wand Chakna' (sharing with others), and 'Naam Japna' (meditation on the divine name). He also engaged in farming during this time.

Following his death, a dispute arose over his 'chadar' (shawl) between Hindus and Muslims. This was resolved by dividing the chadar, with the Muslims burying their portion and the Hindus cremating theirs. Due to periodic flooding of the cremation site by the Ravi River, Guru Nanak's son, Baba Sri Chand, moved the ashes to a safer location, which is now known as Dera Baba Nanak.

The main shrine building was built in 1925 at a cost of Rs. 1,35,600, donated by Sardar Bhupindar Singh, the Maharaja of Patiala. It was repaired by the Government of Pakistan in 1995, and fully restored in 2004, at a significant cost. In May 2017, the US-based NGO "EcoSikh" proposed establishment of a 100-acre "sacred forest" around the shrine. The Gurdwara was further expanded in November 2018 with the construction of a new courtyard, museum, library, dormitories and locker rooms spread across an area of 42 acres (17 hectares). The site includes a 20-foot well of small red bricks which is 500 years old and believed to have been built during the lifetime of Guru Nanak Dev.

== Location ==
Gurdwara Kartarpur Sahib is located in the Shakargarh Tehsil of the Narowal District in Punjab, Pakistan.

== Significance ==
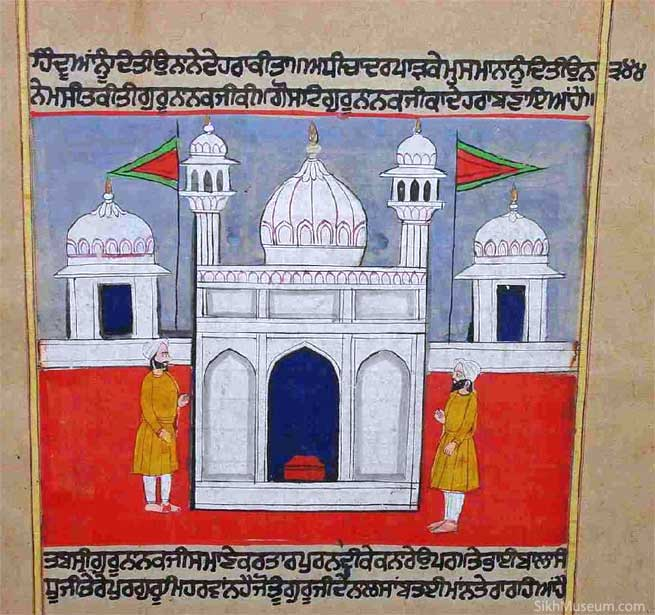
"Death of Guru Nanak" from an Illustrated Janamsakhi manuscript. Punjab, late 18th century - early 19th century

The gurdwara was built to commemorate the site where Guru Nanak, the founder of Sikhism, settled and farmed after his missionary work. Guru Nanak founded the Kartarpur town by Ravi River in 1504, plowing the fields and setting up a langar (community kitchen). He assembled a Sikh commune there, and lived for 18 years until his death on 22 September 1539. The gurdwara is built where Guru Nanak is said to have died. It is one of the holiest sites in Sikhism.

Here, Guru Nanak gave the three principles of Kirat Karo, Naam Japo, Vand Chako, meaning to work hard for a livelihood, remember God, and share your bounties with the world. Guru's teachings have been peace, harmony, and universal brotherhood. Guru Nanak believed in equality between castes, religions, and genders and gave the word Ik Onkar meaning there is only one God.

According to Lahore-based art historian Fakr Syed Aijazuddin, the shrine houses the last copies of the original Guru Granth Sahib. A Sikh pilgrim remarked, "Every step here reminds us of the Guru's life". Indian Sikhs gather in large numbers on bluffs on the Indian side of the border to obtain darshan, or sacred viewing, of the site.

There is a popular legend about a dispute between the local Hindus and Muslims after Guru Nanak died. Muslims, who saw him as their pir, wanted to bury him while Hindus, who claimed Nanak as their guru, preferred cremation. According to the legend, Guru Nanak's body was instead turned into flowers which were divided between the two communities.

== Access via Kartarpur Corridor ==
=== Proposals for visa-free access ===
The call for a visa-free Kartarpur Sahib corridor was an old, strong, persistent demand from the Sikh community. The move was mooted first during the then Prime Minister of India Atal Bihari Vajpayee’s bus ride to Lahore in 1999, while Pakistani president Pervez Musharraf approved the idea in 2000, and issued various tenders for construction purposes. India, however, maintained that the two-decade-old request has been lying pending with Pakistan. As the shrine lies only 3 kilometers from the border with India, Pakistan, in the year 2000, agreed to allow Sikh pilgrims from India to visit the shrine visa-free by constructing a bridge from the border to the shrine.

In May 2017, Indian parliamentary standing committee members announced that no such corridor would be established, given the poor state of India-Pakistan relations. Instead, it was said that the government of India might install four binoculars for viewing the site from Dera Baba Nanak situated close to the India–Pakistan border in the Gurdaspur district of the Indian state of Punjab.

In August 2018, then Tourism Minister of the Government of Punjab, Navjot Singh Sidhu was invited to the oath-taking ceremony of his friend from cricketing days and newly elected Prime Minister of Pakistan, Imran Khan. After facing criticism for receiving a hug from General Qamar Javed Bajwa, Chief of the Pakistan Army, Sidhu claimed that Bajwa had assured him of opening the corridor before the 550th birth anniversary of Guru Nanak.

The Government of Pakistan in September 2018, unilaterally decided to open the corridor before the 550th birth anniversary of Guru Nanak for visa-free entry of 5000 Indian Sikhs per day from India to Pakistan. The Government of India approved the building and development of Kartarpur corridor from Dera Baba Nanak in Gurdaspur district to International India–Pakistan border. The Kartarpur Corridor has been termed a "Corridor of Peace. The step was welcomed by Sikh community across the world. After the corridor opening was confirmed by Pakistan's information minister Fawad Chaudhry, Navjot Singh Sidhu appreciated the friendly gesture of Imran Khan. Kartarpur Corridor was welcomed by United Nations and United States Department of State.

=== Inauguration ===
Ahead of Guru Nanak Dev's 550th Prakash Purab celebrations the Kartarpur corridor, connecting Sri Darbar Sahib Dera Baba Nanak in India's Punjab with Gurdwara Darbar Sahib Kartarpur, was thrown open on 9 November 2019 (the anniversary of the Fall of the Berlin Wall) facilitating the first Jatha (batch) of more than 550 pilgrims to travel to the last resting place of Guru Nanak Dev. On Indian side, Prime Minister Narendra Modi thanked his Pakistani counterpart Imran Khan for respecting sentiments of Indians and flagged off the pilgrimage and handed over the flag of the Jatha to Jathedar of Akal Takht Giani Harpreet Singh.

Under the leadership of Akal Takht jathedar Giani Harpreet Singh, the Jatha traveled through the corridor into Pakistan to pay obeisance at Gurdwara Darbar Sahib Kartarpur. On Pakistan side, Imran Khan received the pilgrims and formally inaugurated the Kartarpur corridor by removing a curtain that was lifted by hot air balloons to reveal a huge Kirpan (dagger). Giani Harpreet Singh, speaking at the occasion, thanked both governments for corridor and requested corridor access to Pakistani Sikhs to pay obeisance at Sri Darbar Sahib Dera Baba Nanak on Indian side. Poetry about Guru Nanak, from Muhammad Iqbal's Bang-e-Dara was read by former Indian prime minister Dr. Manmohan Singh and also by Pakistani speakers at inauguration.

== Gallery ==
Photograph published in the early 1960s of the gurdwara site

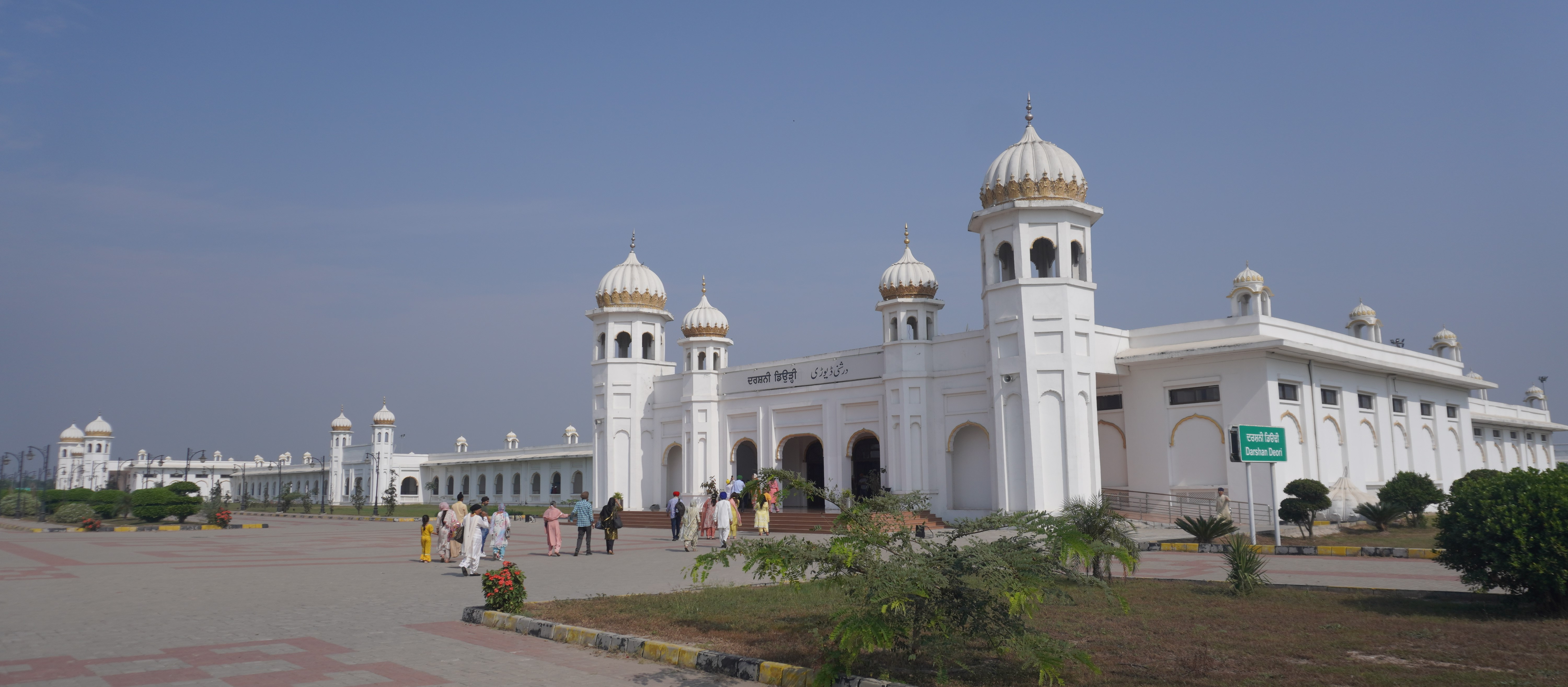
complete view of Gurdwara sahib complex

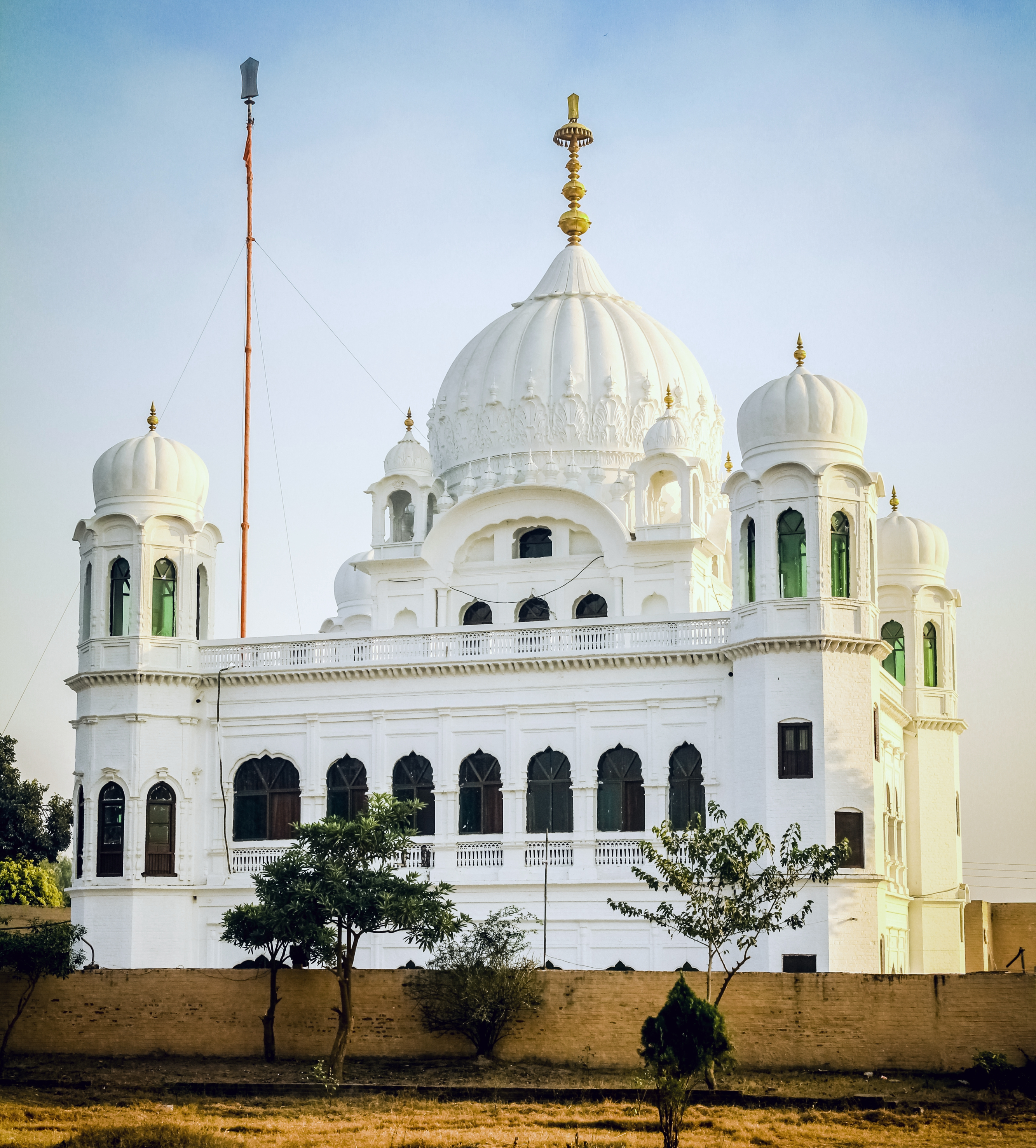
The Gurdwara before construction of the Kartarpur Corridor

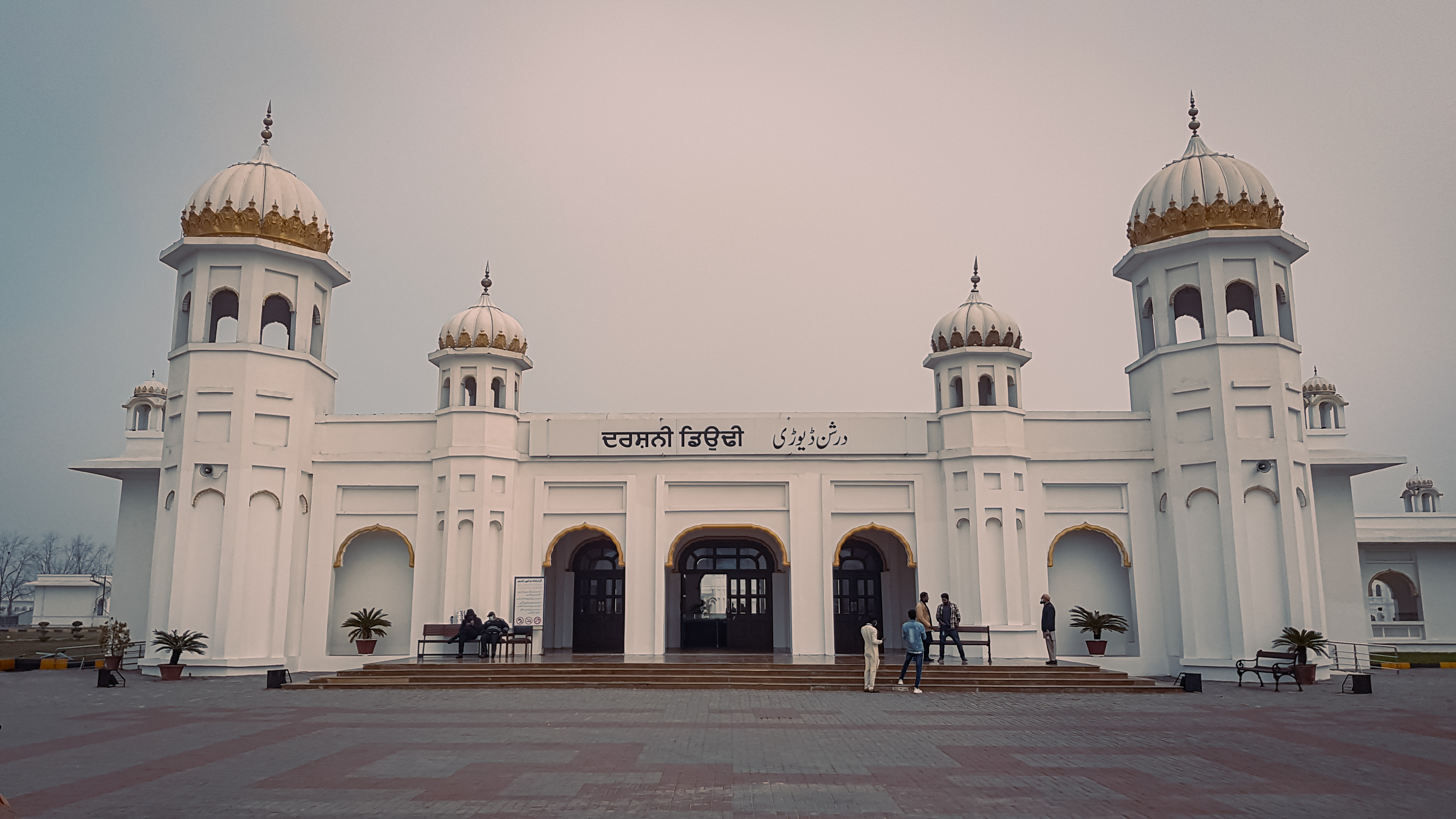
Darshan Deori (gateway)

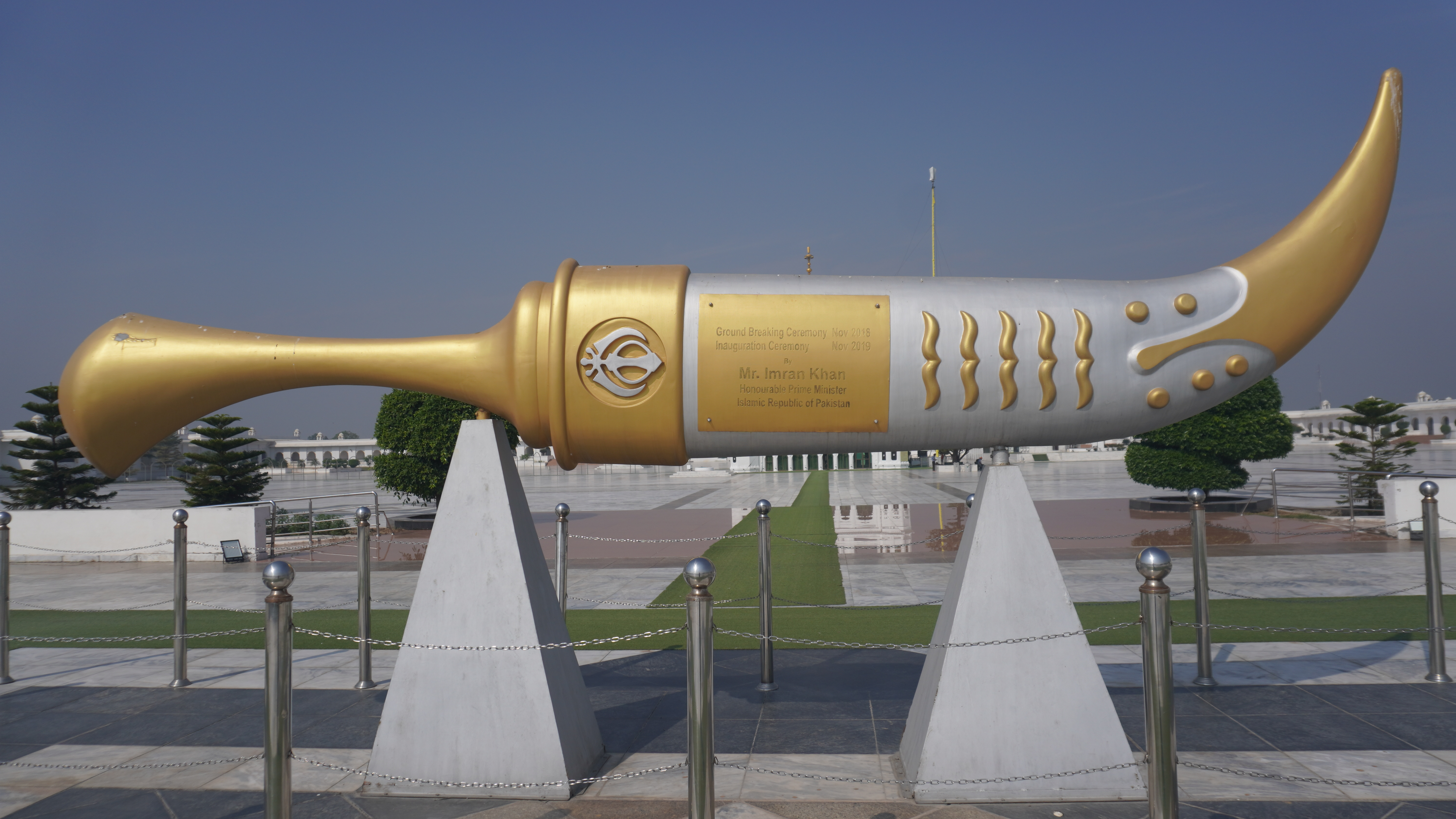
Artistic presentation of Siri Sahib, one of five symbols of Sikhism.

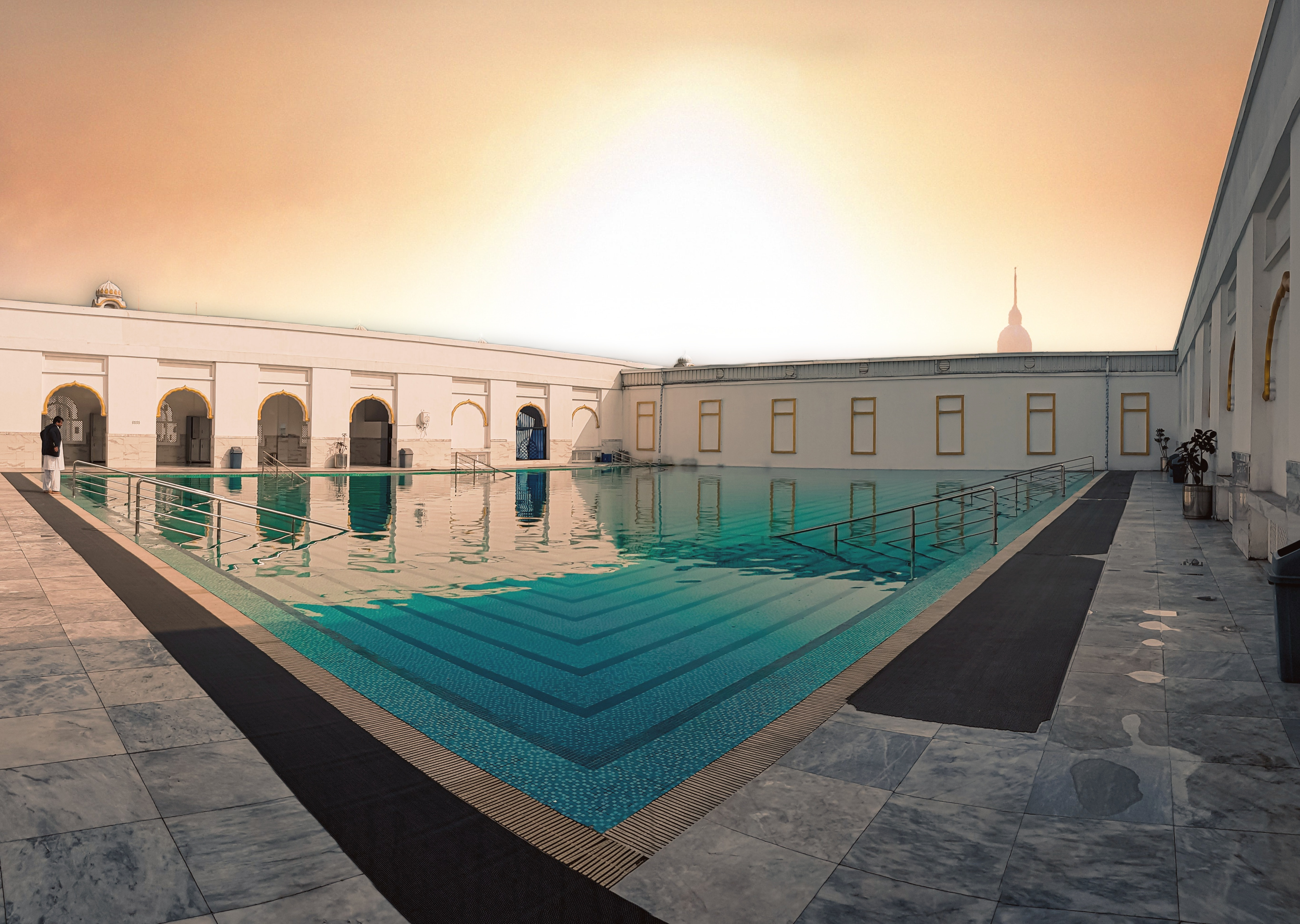
Sarovar Sahib

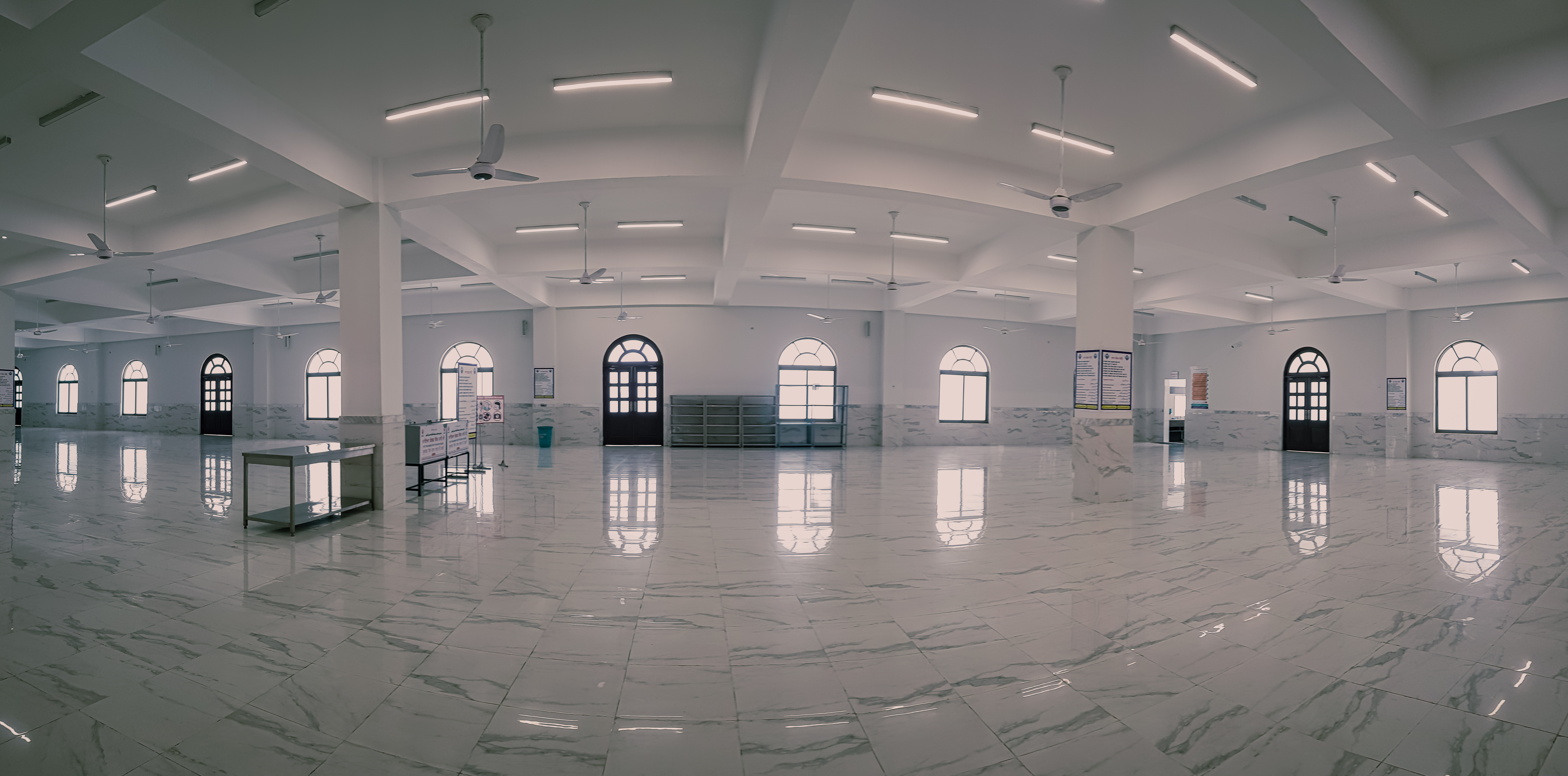
Langar Hall

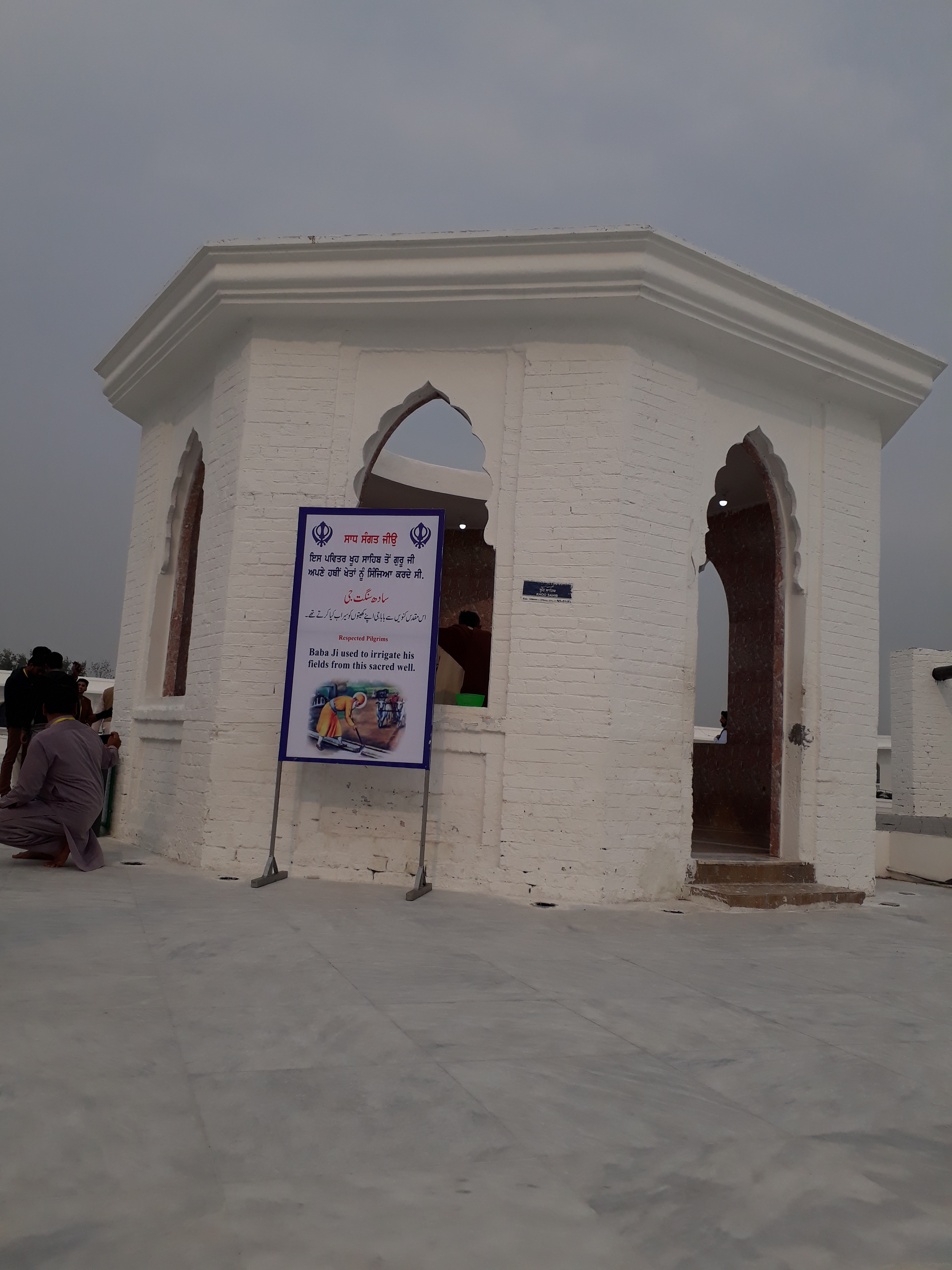
Baba Nanak's Well

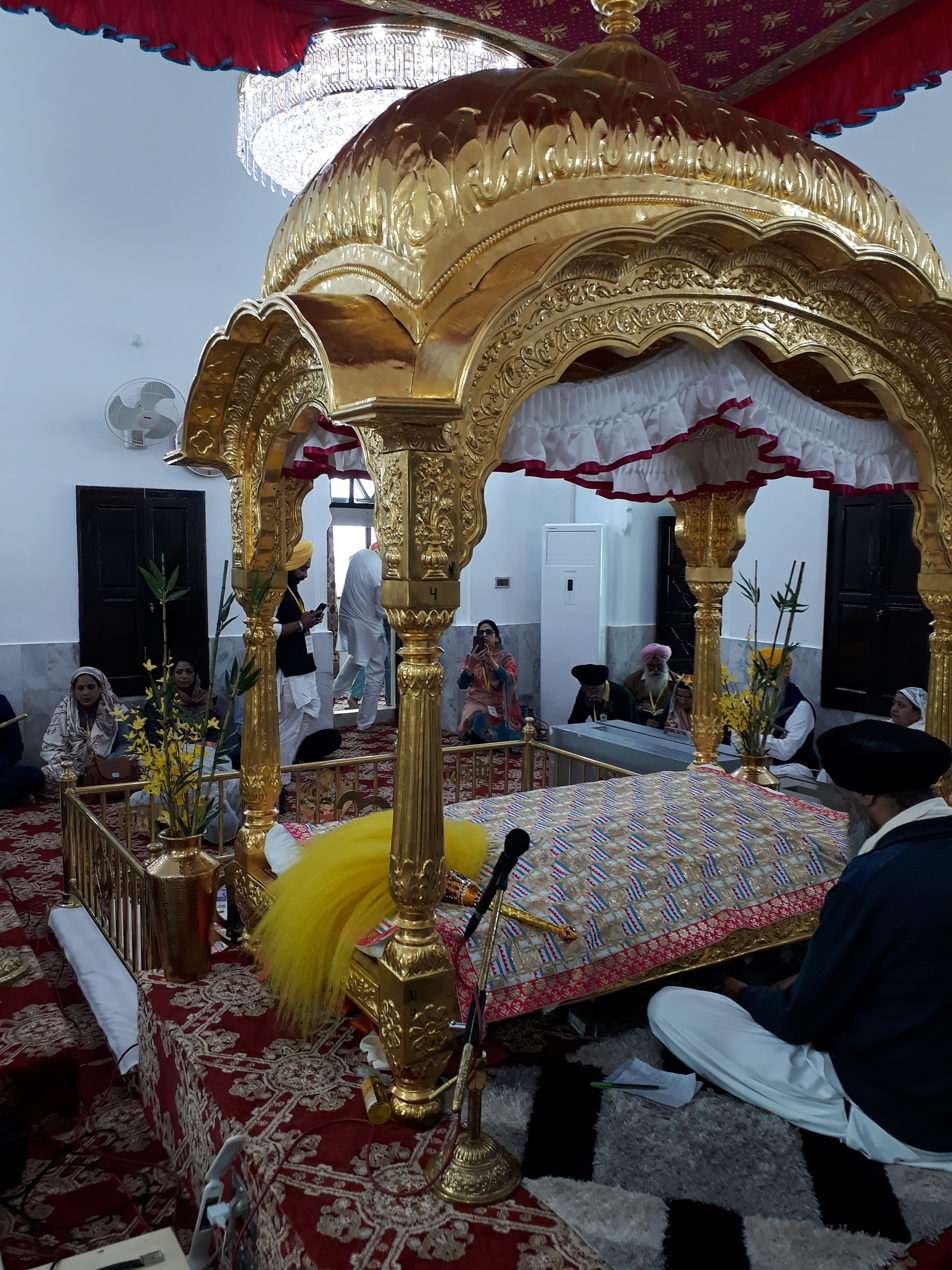
Inside Gurdwara's sanctum sanctorum

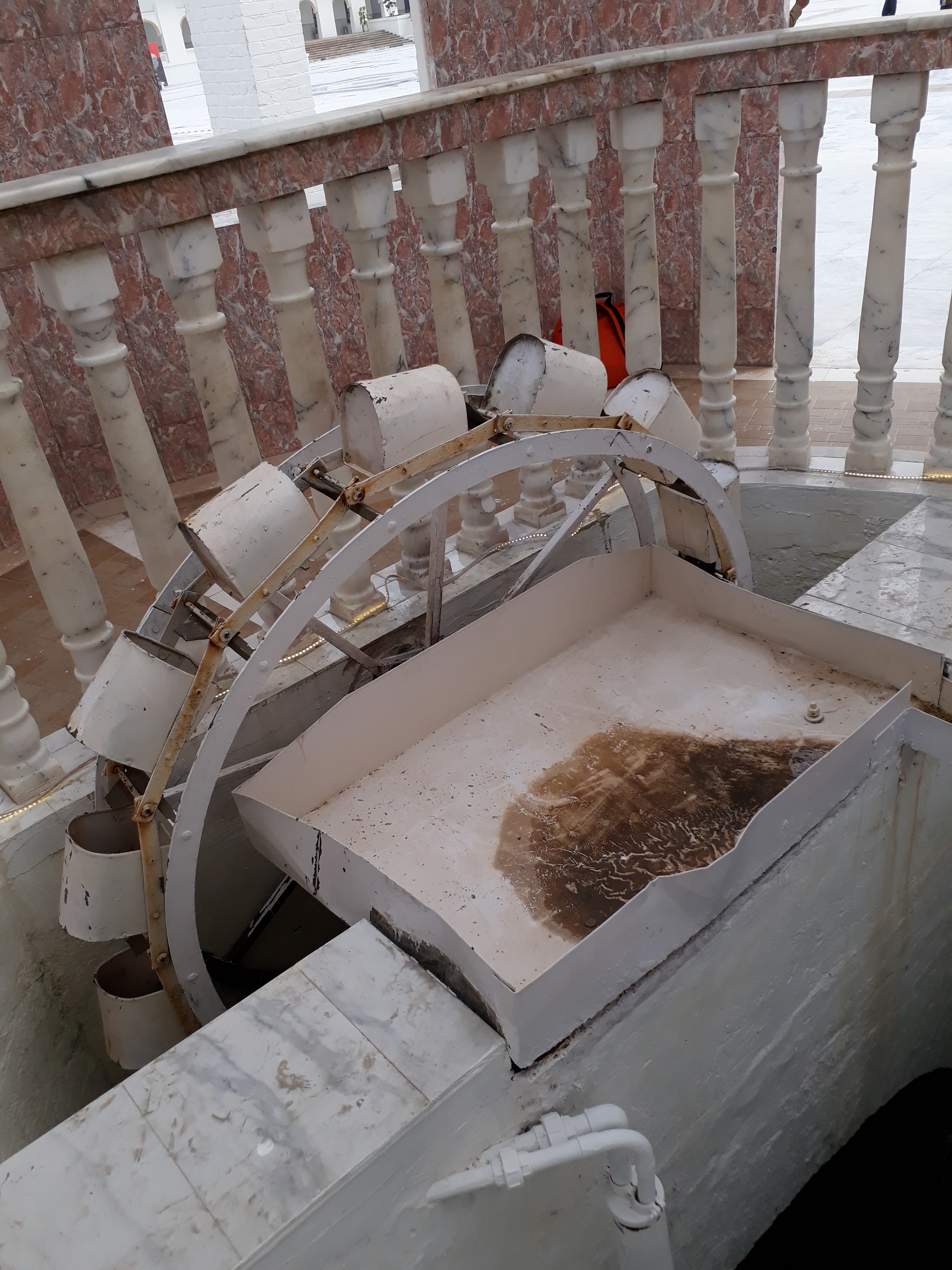
Khue Sahib (Persian wheel)

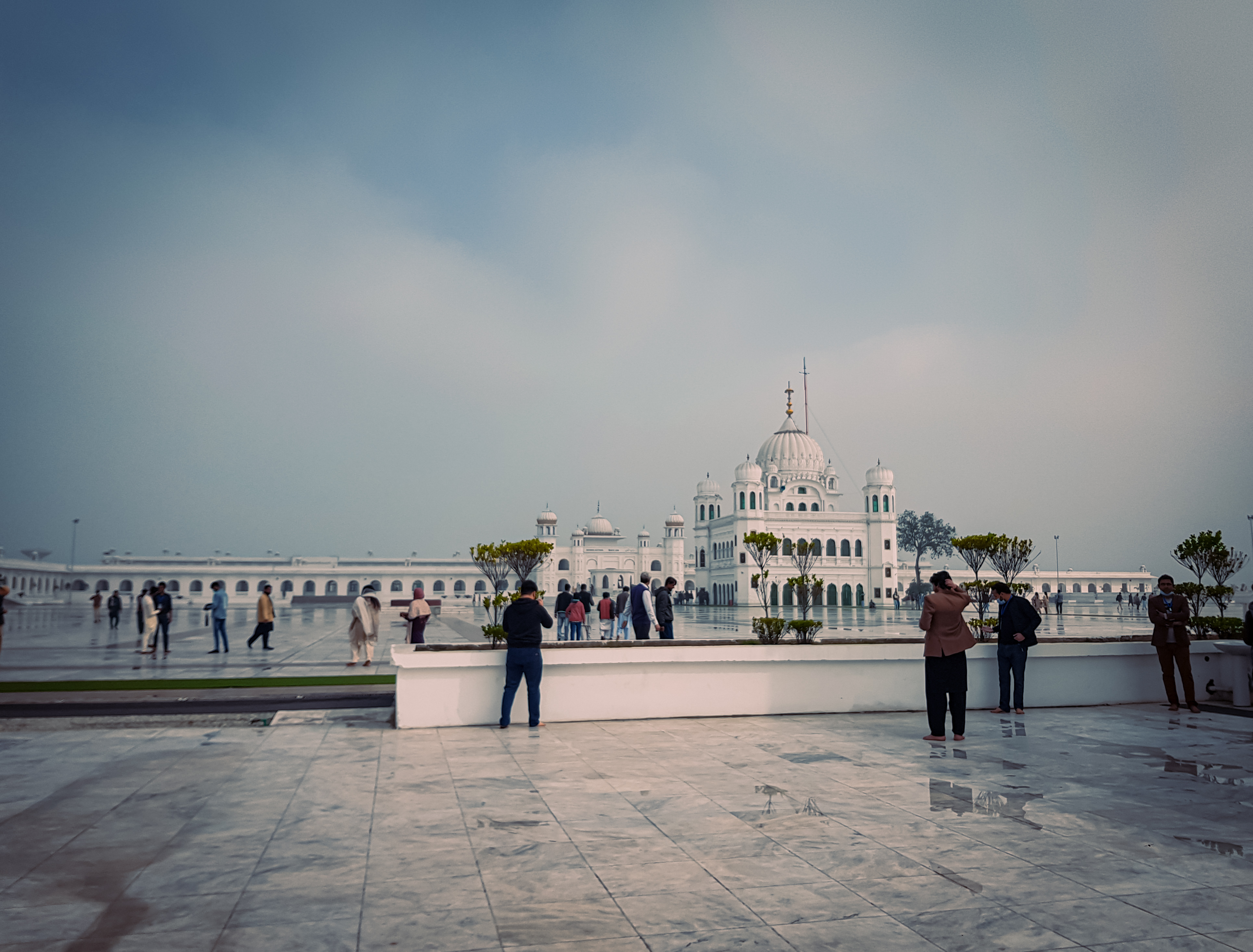
Site of Gurdwara Darbar Sahib in Kartarpur

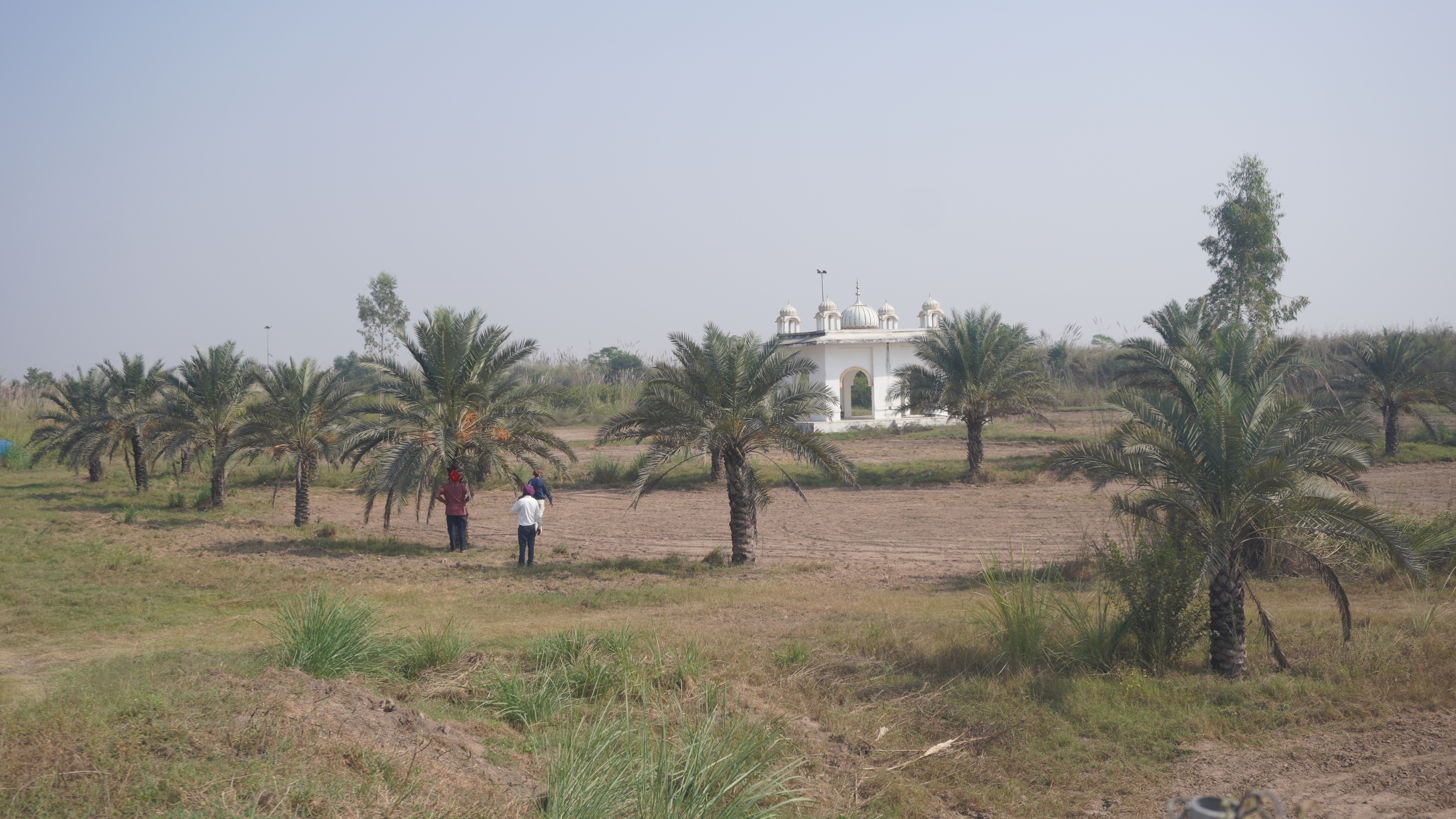
Agricultural fields where Guru Nanak used to perform cultivation, Gurdwara Darbar Sahib Kartarpur, Pakistan

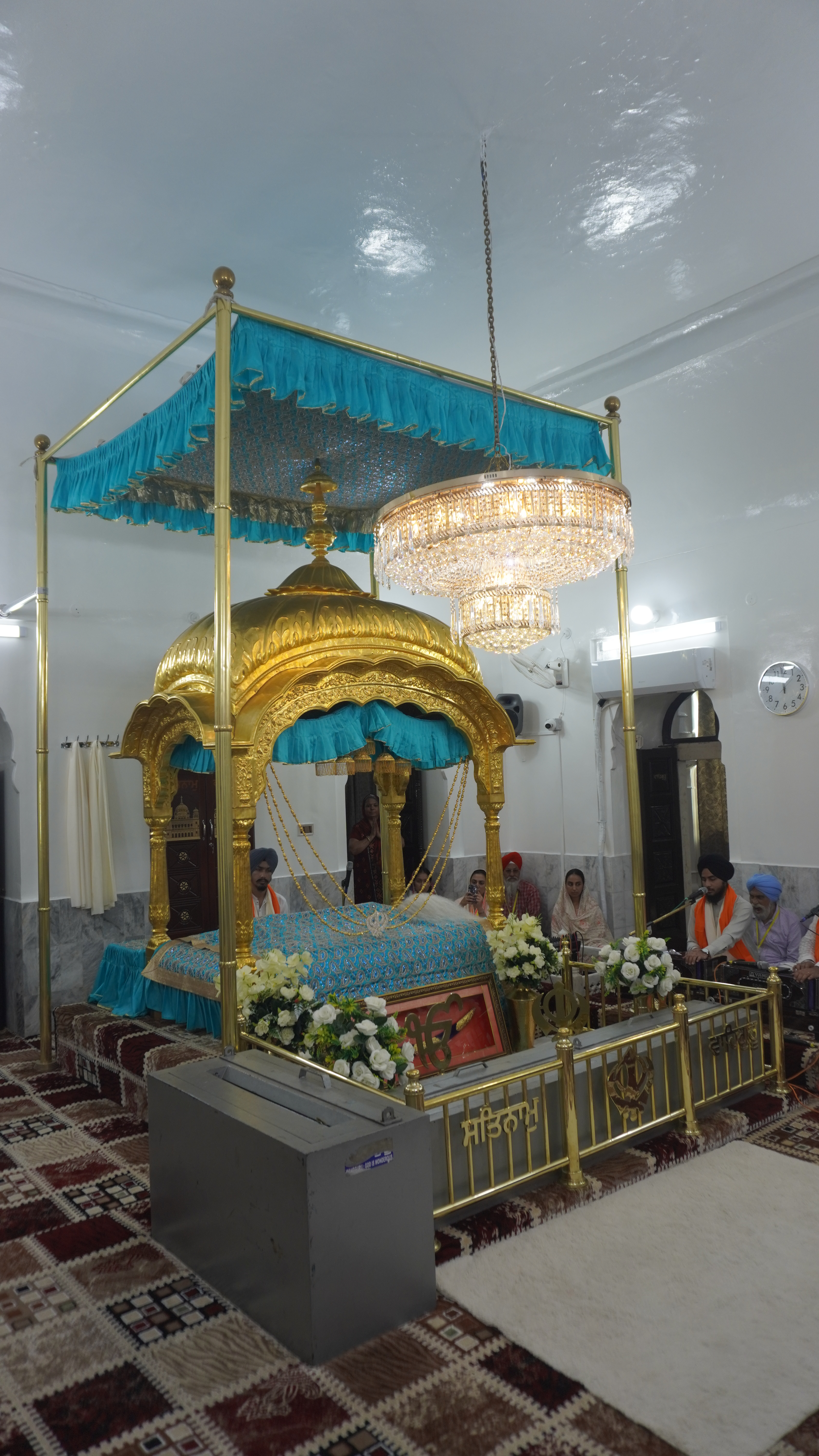
Interior view of the darbar hall of Gurdwara Darbar Sahib

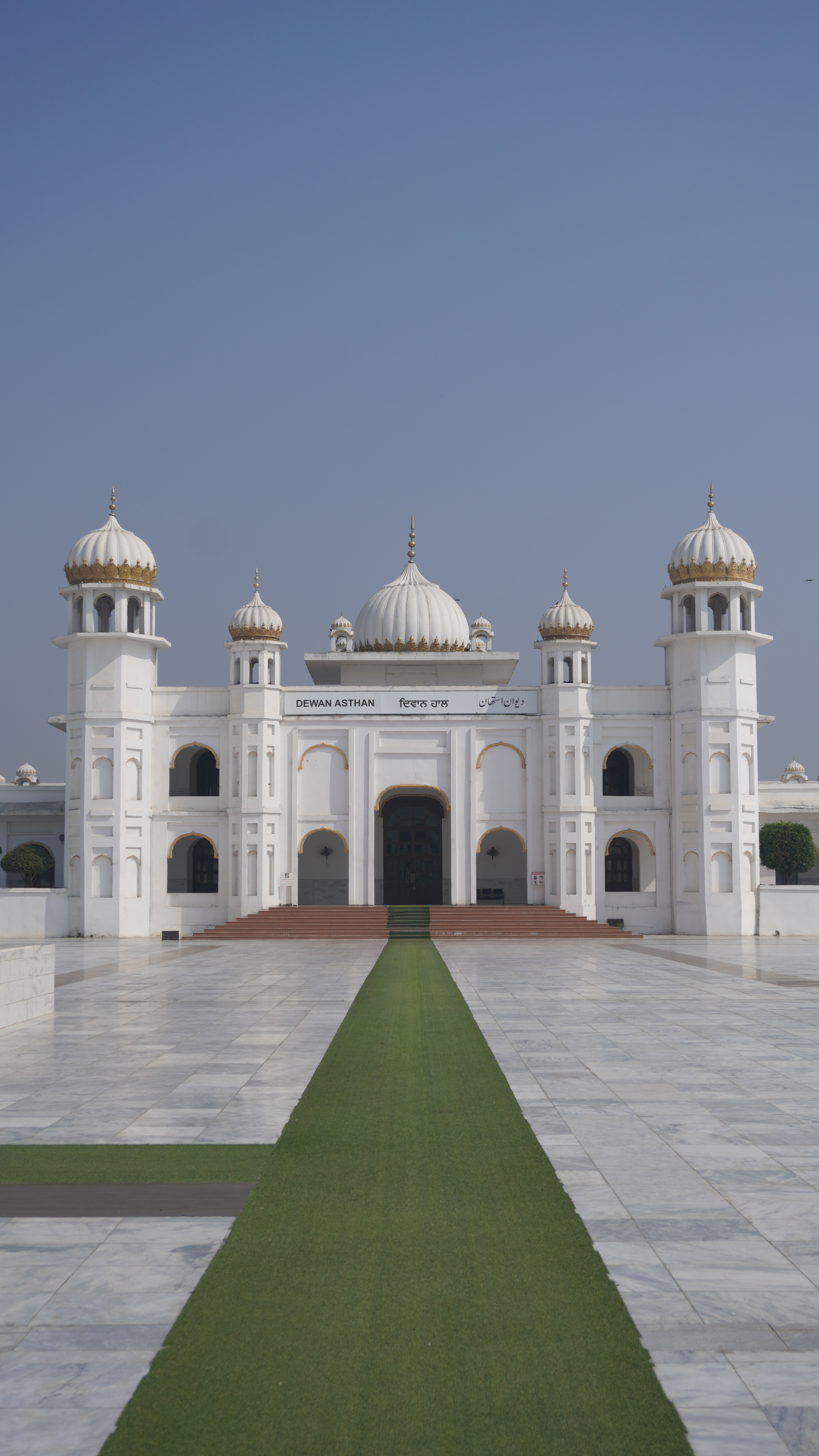
Diwan Hall of the Kartarpur Sahib complex

== See also ==
- List of gurdwaras in Pakistan
- Gurdwara Janam Asthan
- Gurdwara Shahid Ganj Singh Singhania
- Gurdwara Dera Sahib
- Gurdwara Chowa Sahib
- Gurdwara Beri Sahib
- Gurdwara Rori Sahib, Eminabad
- Gurudwara Shaheed Bhai Taru Singh
