= Kartarpur Corridor =

Border corridor between India and Pakistan

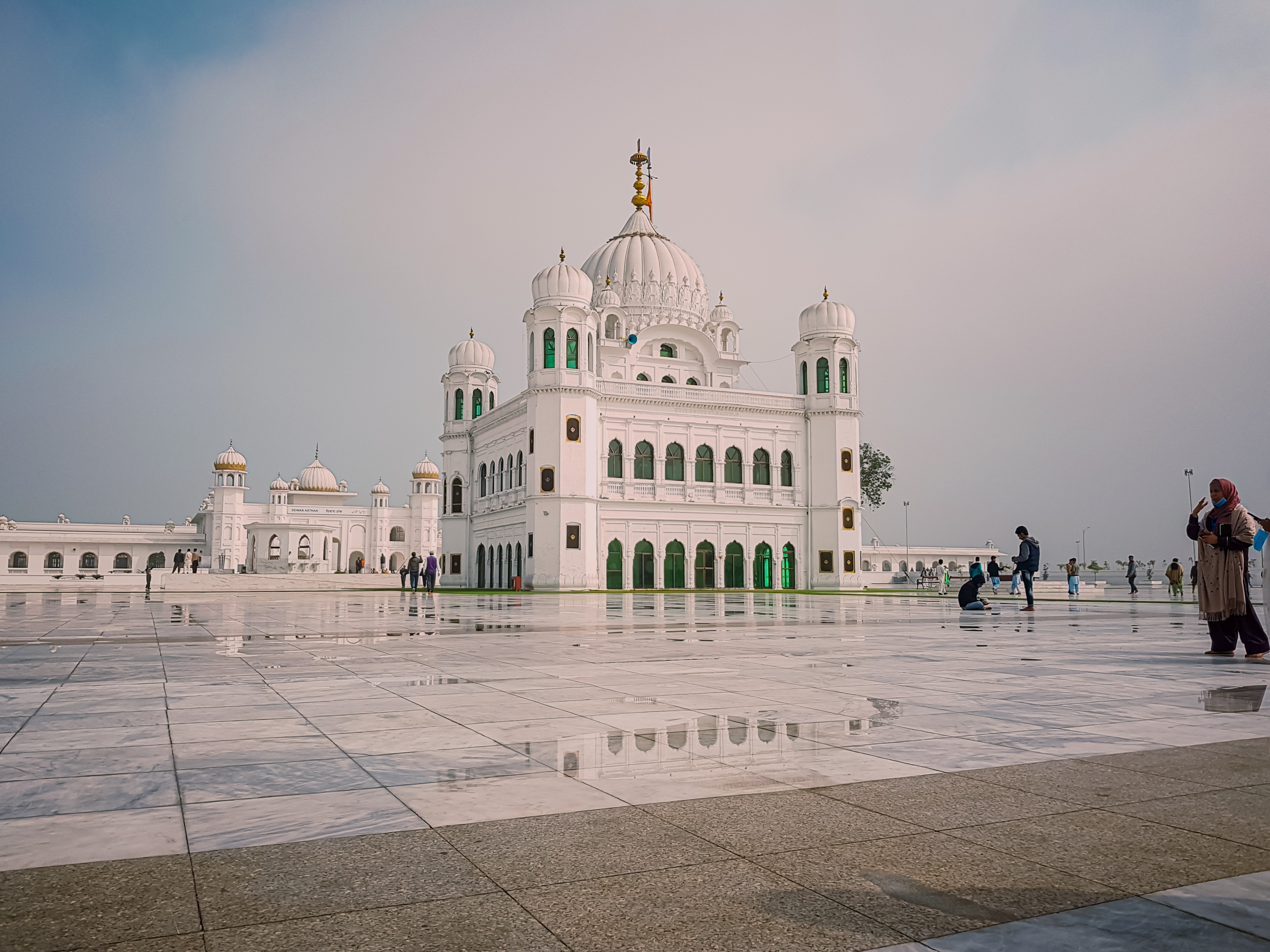
- Gurdwara Darbar Sahib in Kartarpur, Pakistan Start and end points of the Kartarpur Corridor
- Type of project: Religious
- Location: Katarpur, Pakistan; Dera Baba Nanak, India
- Founder: (Pakistan) Imran Khan (India) Narendra Modi
- Country: India; Pakistan
- Established: 9 November 2019; 6 years ago
- Budget: State funded $88 million
- Status: Closed indefinitely from Indian side
- Website: Pilgrimage to Sri Kartarpur Sahib; For online pilgrimage visa application from overseas

Kartarpur Corridor
- Punjabi language
- Gurmukhi: ਕਰਤਾਰਪੁਰ ਲਾਂਘਾ
- Transliteration: kartārpur lāṅghā
- Shahmukhi: کَرْتار پُور لان٘گھا
- Transliteration: kartār pūr lāṉghā
- IPA: /kəɾət̪ɑːɾəpuɾə lɑ̃ːgʰɑː/

The Kartarpur Corridor (Punjabi: ਕਰਤਾਰਪੁਰ ਲਾਂਘਾ (Gurmukhi), کرتارپور لانگھا (Shahmukhi), romanized: kartārpur lāṅghā; Urdu: کرتارپور راہداری, romanized: kartār pūr rāhdārī) is a visa-free border crossing and religious corridor, connecting two gurdwaras (Sikh temples), Gurdwara Darbar Sahib, near Narowal in Pakistan and Gurudwara Dera Baba Nanak, Gurdaspur district, Punjab, India. The crossing allows devotees from India to visit the gurdwara in Kartarpur, Pakistan, 4.7 kilometres (2.9 miles) from the India–Pakistan border on the Pakistani side without a visa. Pakistani Sikhs are unable to use the border crossing, and cannot access Dera Baba Nanak on the Indian side without first obtaining an Indian visa or unless they work there.

The Kartarpur Corridor was first proposed in early 1999 by Atal Bihari Vajpayee and Nawaz Sharif, the Prime Ministers of India and Pakistan respectively at that time, as part of the Delhi–Lahore Bus diplomacy.

On 26 November 2018, the foundation stone was laid down on the Indian side by Prime Minister Narendra Modi; two days later, then Pakistani Prime Minister Imran Khan did the same for the Pakistani side. The corridor was completed for the 550th anniversary of the birth of Guru Nanak, on 12 November 2019. Khan said "Pakistan believes that the road to prosperity of region [sic] and bright future of our coming generation lies in peace", adding that "Pakistan is not only opening the border but also their hearts for the Sikh community". Modi compared the decision by the two countries to go ahead with the corridor to the fall of the Berlin Wall in November 1989, saying that the project could help ease tensions between the two countries.

Previously, Sikh pilgrims from India had to travel to Lahore to get to Kartarpur, a 125 kilometres (78 miles) journey, even though people on the Indian side of the border could see Gurdwara Darbar Sahib Kartarpur from the Indian side, where an elevated observation platform was constructed.

On 17 November 2021, the Kartarpur Corridor re-opened after over a year and a half of closure due to the COVID-19 pandemic. Both India and Pakistan allowed citizens to visit the Gurdwara on the condition that they carry both a negative COVID-19 test result and certificate of vaccination. Following the 2025 Pahalgam attack and the ensuing crisis, Indian authorities indefinitely suspended corridor services on 7 May 2025.

== Background ==
The first guru of Sikhism, Guru Nanak, founded Kartarpur in 1504 CE on the right bank of the Ravi River and established the first Sikh commune there. Following his death in 1539, Hindus and Muslims both claimed him as their own and raised mausoleums in his memory with a common wall between them. The changing course of the Ravi River eventually washed away the mausoleums. A new habitation was formed, representing the present-day Dera Baba Nanak on the left bank of the Ravi river.

After the 1947 partition of India, the region was divided between India and Pakistan. The Radcliffe Line awarded the Shakargarh tehsil on the right bank of the Ravi River, including Kartarpur, to Pakistan, and the Gurdaspur tehsil on the left bank of Ravi to India. In 1948, the Akali Dal demanded that India should acquire the land of the gurdwaras in Nankana Sahib and Kartarpur. The demands persisted till 1959, but the Punjab state government controlled by the Indian National Congress advised against any modification of the boundary fixed by the Radcliffe Award.

For many years following partition, Indian Sikhs could visit Kartarpur informally by crossing the Jassar bridge (32.04923°N 74.99242°E) on the Ravi river, as border controls between the two countries were not strictly enforced until 1965. The bridge was destroyed by Pakistani forces during the Indo-Pakistan war of 1965 to inhibit potential Indian advances, and border controls became more tightly regulated.

In 1969, on the occasion of the 500th anniversary of the birth of Guru Nanak, Prime Minister Indira Gandhi promised to approach the Pakistani government for a land-swap so that Kartarpur Sahib could become part of India; however, none of this materialised. In September 1974, a protocol was agreed between India and Pakistan for visits to religious shrines. Around 2005, the protocol was updated by increasing the number of visits and the number of sites. However, Kartarpur was not among the sites included in the 1974 protocol. According to the Indian Ministry of External Affairs, India had requested its inclusion but this was not agreed to by Pakistan.

Gobind Singh, the caretaker of the gurdwara at Kartarpur, said the gurdwara had "remained shut from 1947 to 2000". The gurdwara had no staff, despite receiving pilgrims, and entrance was restricted. The Pakistani government started repairing the shrine in September 2000 ahead of the anniversary of Guru Nanak's death and formally reopened it in September 2004. The Kartarpur Corridor mission was initially started by Bhabishan Singh Goraya, who pursued the cause for 24 years.

According to Akali leader Kuldeep Singh Wadala, the gurdwara had been abandoned till 2003. It served as a cattle shed for the villagers and its lands were taken over by share-croppers. Since 2003, however, the Pakistani government has reportedly taken initiatives for the upkeep of Sikh religious shrines.

== Recent initiatives ==
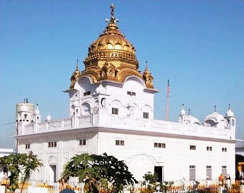
Sri Dera Baba Nanak Sahib, in the Indian town of Dera Baba Nanak

During the tenure of Prime Ministers Nawaz Sharif and Atal Bihari Vajpayee, the opening of Kartarpur border crossing was first discussed in 1998. After further discussions during the 1999 bus diplomacy, Pakistan renovated the Kartarpur Sahib gurdwara, and made it available for viewing from the Indian border. The tensions arising from the Kargil War had effectively destroyed India–Pakistan relations. However, it was reported that General Pervez Musharraf gave a 'green signal' for constructing a corridor, according to the Pakistan Gurdwara Prabandhak Committee chairman Lt.-Gen. Javed Nasir.

Manmohan Singh, during his first term as the prime minister of India, also tabled the issue in a speech in Punjab in 2004. The 'composite dialogue process' between India and Pakistan initiated in 2004 also discussed access to Kartarpur via an Amritsar–Lahore–Kartarpur road link.

In 2008, the Indian foreign minister Pranab Mukherjee raised with his Pakistani counterpart Shah Mehmood Qureshi the idea of "visa-free travel" to Kartarpur. There was apparently no official response, but privately, Pakistan began to express its openness to the Sikh community. However, even up to 2012, the Indian government had no response. The hostility between the countries was apparently to blame.

On 20 June 2008, at a press conference in Dera Baba Nanak arranged by Akali leader Kuldeep Singh Wadala, John W. McDonald, a former American ambassador and founder of Institute for Multi-Track Diplomacy, called for "a peace corridor, a peace zone" connecting shrines on both sides of the border. On 28 June 2008, the Indian foreign minister at the time, Pranab Mukherjee, said that the Indian government would carry out a feasibility study for the peace corridor. However, since the 2008 Mumbai attacks took place, the relations between India and Pakistan nosedived and the initiative faltered. Members of the Sikh community in Washington DC worked with the Institute for Multi-Track Diplomacy to carry out an independent feasibility study. In August 2010, their report titled "Kartarpur Marg" was released by Surinder Singh and the Institute. According to the report, the cost of the corridor would be 17 million US dollars, which the Sikh diaspora agreed to raise. The report had said that it would cost Pakistan $14.8 million and India $2.2 million. In November 2010, the Punjab state legislative assembly unanimously passed a resolution in favour of an international passage between the two sites and forwarded it to the Indian Union government on 1 October 2010.

== Corridor project ==
In August 2018, the then Indian Punjab tourism minister Navjot Singh Sidhu attended the Pakistani Prime Minister Imran Khan's inaugural ceremony where he was told by the Pakistan Army chief Qamar Javed Bajwa of Pakistan's willingness to open the Dera Baba Nanak–Kartarpur corridor on Guru Nanak's 550th birth anniversary. Given the clear time frame, this set the ball rolling.

In August 2018, another resolution related to the corridor in the Indian Punjab Vidhan Sabha was moved by then chief minister Amarinder Singh, which was passed unanimously. Following this the government of Indian Punjab decided to approach the prime minister of India related to the opening of the corridor. On 30 October 2018, a group of Sikh Americans sought the Indian prime minister's help in opening the corridor. In November 2018, the Indian Cabinet approved the plan to set up the corridor and appealed to Pakistan to do the same. The Pakistani foreign minister S. M. Qureshi responded by tweeting that Pakistan had "already conveyed to India" that it would open a corridor.

In August 2019, India and Pakistan agreed to allow visa-free travel of Indian citizens to Kartarpur, but differences persisted about Indian consular officers being located at the site.

On 24 October 2019, S.C.L. Das, Joint Secretary (Internal Security) in the Union Home Ministry from India and Pakistan Foreign Office Director General South Asia and SAARC Mohammad Faisal met at Zero Point near Dera Baba Nanak in the border town of Gurdaspur to ink the memorandum of understanding. The signing of this agreement has paved the way for 5,000 Indian pilgrims to visit the holy site without a visa on a daily basis. Under the agreement, the pilgrims would come in the morning and return in the evening after visiting Gurdwara Darbar Sahib. Each visitor would be required to pay USD $20 as a service charge, which as per Pakistan Foreign Office's DG South Asia & SAARC Mohammad Faisal, would only cover one-third of the current operational cost. India however, had urged Pakistan to waive off the fees for pilgrims. In response, on 1 November 2019, Pakistan's prime minister Imran Khan announced on Twitter that Sikh pilgrims coming from India for a pilgrimage to Kartarpur will not be charged any fee on the day of inauguration and on Guru Nanak's 550th birth anniversary on 12 November 2019. The Pakistan government as a "special gesture" had also waived the passport requirement for Kartarpur pilgrims extending up to one year. However, the Indian government decided against availing "concessions" announced by Prime Minister Imran Khan. The Indian Ministry of External Affairs announced that passport would be required per the agreement between the two countries.

In October 2024, India and Pakistan renewed their agreement to enable pilgrims through the corridor for an additional five-year period.

=== Design of Gurudwara complex ===
The Gurudwara complex will have an international standard hotel, hundreds of apartments, two commercial areas and two car parking lots, border facility area, a power grid station, tourist information centre and several offices. It also has a 13-bedded Medical Centre founded by Dr. Umair, a known physician of town. Over 400 acres of land was acquired by the Pakistani government to establish the main complex and its surrounding areas. The main complex has been expanded 10 times from its original 4 acres to 42 acres. The masterplan of the complex has been prepared with visitors from countries other than India in mind.

=== Construction ===
In November 2018, foundation stones for the corridor were laid on the two sides of the border by Pakistan Prime Minister Imran Khan and the Indian Vice President Venkaiah Naidu respectively.

Pakistan's Frontier Works Organization constructed 4.7 kilometres (2.9 mi) of dedicated expressway, including an 800-metre (2,600 ft) bridge over the River Ravi. An immigration office was also constructed, and Gurudwara Darbar Sahib premises was expanded to accommodate the incoming pilgrims. The first phase of the construction of Kartarpur Corridor project was completed in early November 2019.

Land Ports Authority of India, National Highways Authority of India and Ceigall India Ltd constructed the Indian side of the corridor. A State-of-the-Art Integrated check post (ICP), 3.5 km four-lane highway and a 100-metre bridge at Dera Baba Nanak were constructed.

== Inauguration ==
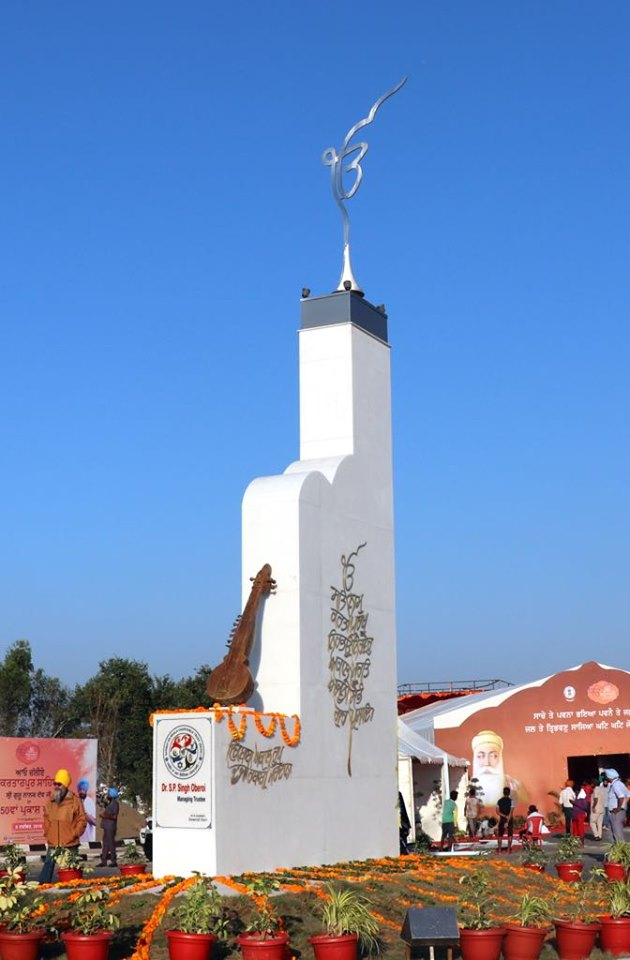
An Art installation at Indian side of Kartarpur Corridor, at Dera Baba Nanak

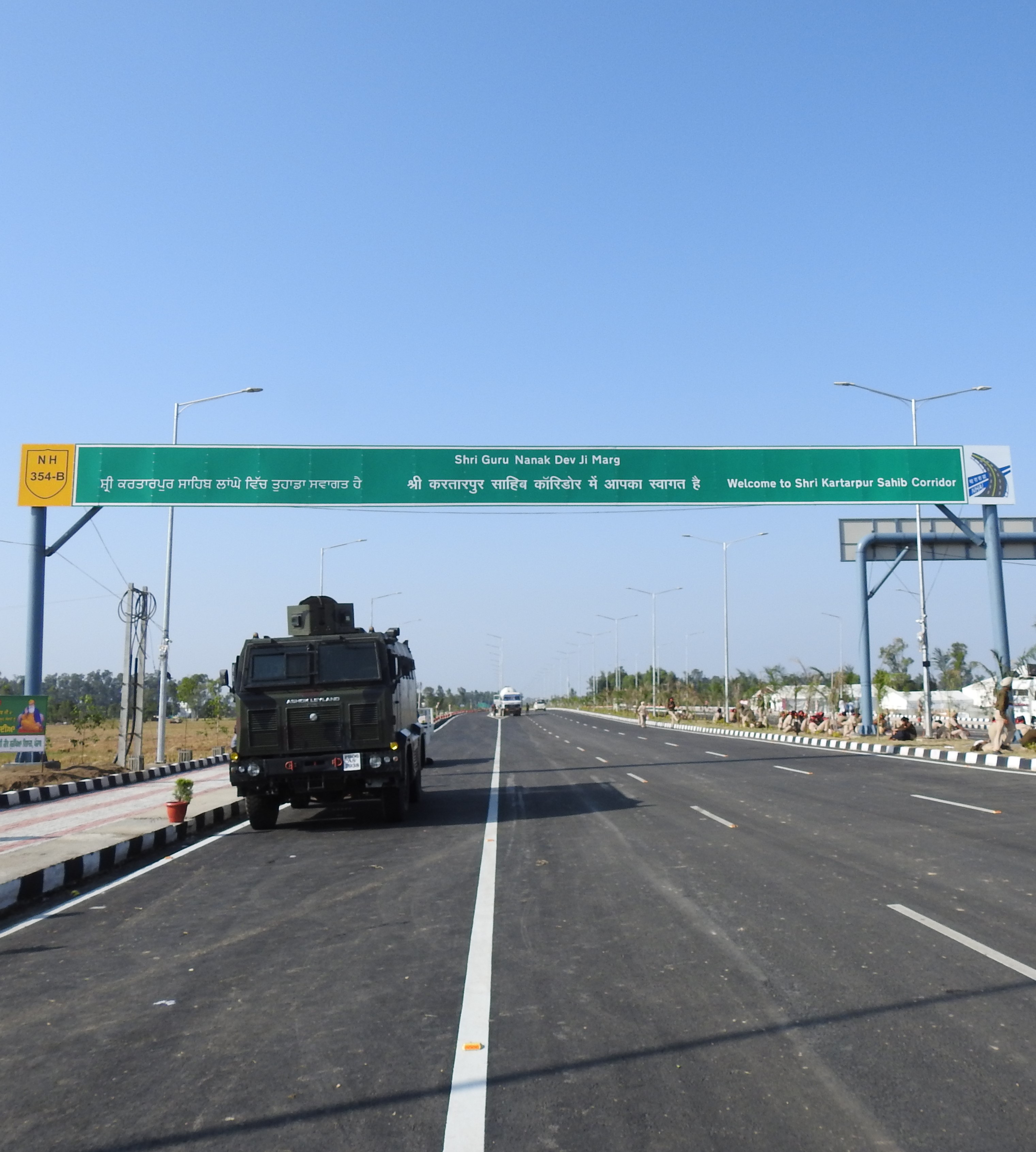
Entrance of the Kartarpur Sahib Corridor (or Nanak Marg) from Indian side of border

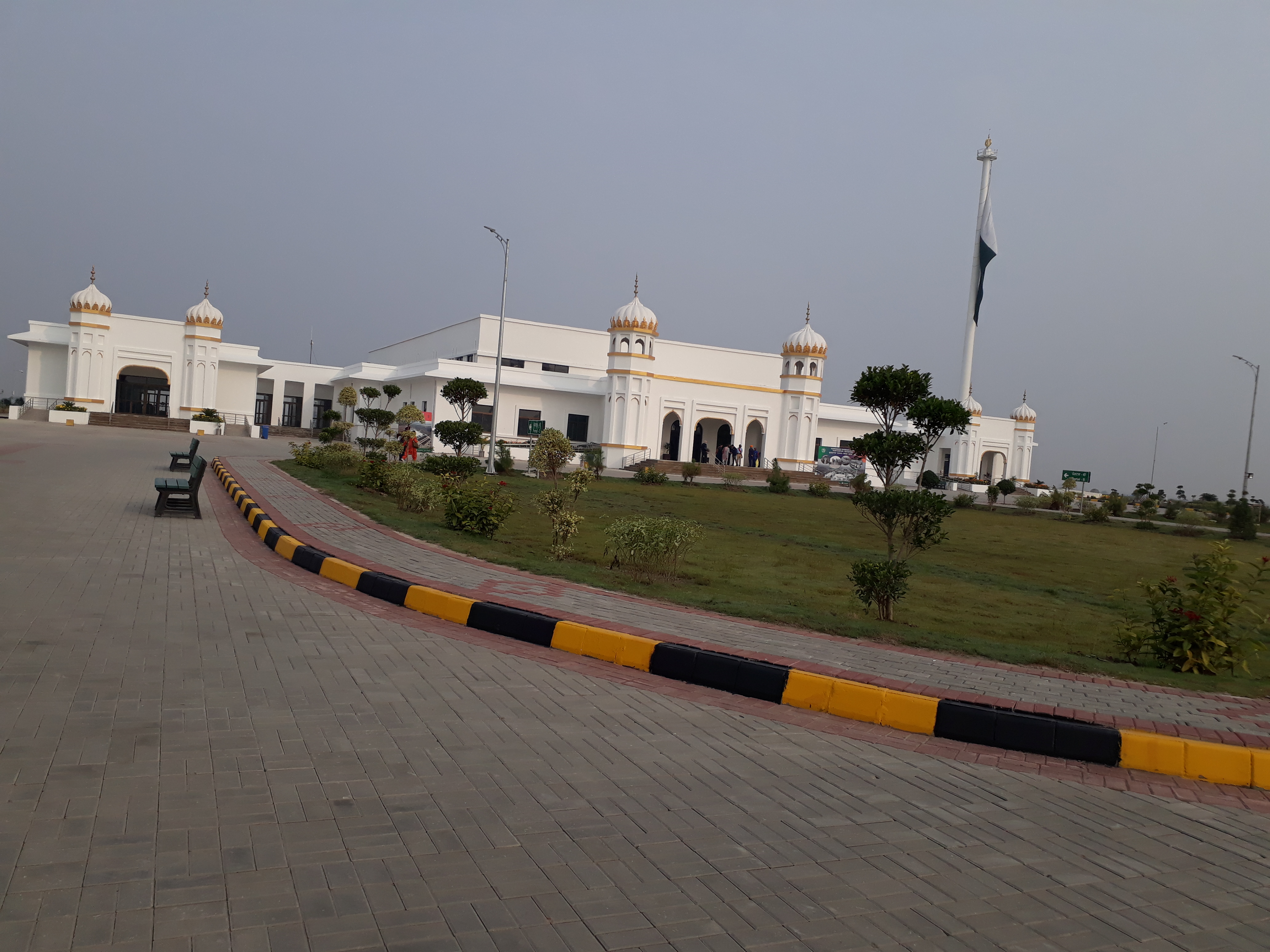
Immigration Terminal on Pakistan side

On 9 November 2019, Pakistani Prime Minister Imran Khan inaugurated the Kartarpur corridor at a ceremony that was held in Gurdwara Darbar Sahib complex, Kartarpur and around 12,000 pilgrims were present on this ceremony. Imran Khan received the pilgrims and formally inaugurated the Kartarpur corridor by removing a curtain that was lifted by hot air balloons from a huge kirpan (dagger). On the occasion, Prime Minister Khan said "Pakistan believes that the road to prosperity of region [sic] and bright future of our coming generation lies in peace, saying that today (9 November 2019) Pakistan is not only opening the border but also their hearts for the Sikh community."

Ahead of Guru Nanak's 550th Prakash Purab celebrations, the corridor was open on 9 November 2019, facilitating the first Jatha (batch) of more than 550 pilgrims to travel to the final resting place of Guru Nanak. Indian Prime Minister Narendra Modi welcomed the move and compared the decision for the corridor between the two countries to the fall of the Berlin Wall, saying that the project may help in easing tensions between the two countries. During the inauguration speech, he also said, "I would like to thank the Prime Minister of Pakistan, Imran Khan Niazi for respecting the sentiment of India." Modi flagged off the pilgrimage and handed over the flag of the Jatha to Jathedar of Akal Takht Giani Harpreet Singh.

Under the leadership of Akal Takht jathedar Giani Harpreet Singh, the Jatha traveled through the corridor into Pakistan to pay obeisance at Gurdwara Darbar Sahib Kartarpur. The Indian Sikh delegation that included former Indian Prime Minister Manmohan Singh, the then Indian Punjab Chief Minister Amarinder Singh, the then Tourism Minister Navjot Singh Sidhu and actor-turned-politician Sunny Deol arrived through Kartarpur Corridor to celebrate the 550th anniversary of the birth of Guru Nanak and attended the inauguration ceremony on the special invitation from the then Pakistani Prime Minister Imran Khan.

Jathedar Giani Harpreet Singh, speaking on the occasion, thanked both governments for corridor. Navjot Singh Sidhu in his speech said that Prime Minister Khan had won the heart of Sikh community by opening the corridor. He mentioned that Alexander III of Macedon won the heart of people by fighting, while Khan won hearts of many Sikhs around the world by giving access to their holy land Kartarpur. Earlier, however, the Indian government's denial of political clearance to Sidhu to visit Pakistan for the Kartarpur inauguration had snowballed into a last-moment controversy. Poetry about Guru Nanak from Allama Iqbal's Bang-e-Dara was also read by former PM Dr. Manmohan Singh and also by Pakistani speakers at inauguration.

== Security concerns and propaganda ==
In November 2019, media reported that Indian security agencies had spotted alleged JeM terrorist training camp in the Narowal district, where the gurdwara is located. The Foreign Office of Pakistan rebutted the Indian claims as baseless propaganda.

In 2019, in a criticized act, an unexploded bomb was placed on display inside the Kartarpur Sahib Gurudwara premises with an accompanying banner alleging that the Indian Air Force had dropped this bomb during the 1971 Indo-Pakistani war on the gurdwara in an attempt to destroy it. The Sikh pilgrims voiced their sentiments against any "dirty politics" in the name of the Guru.

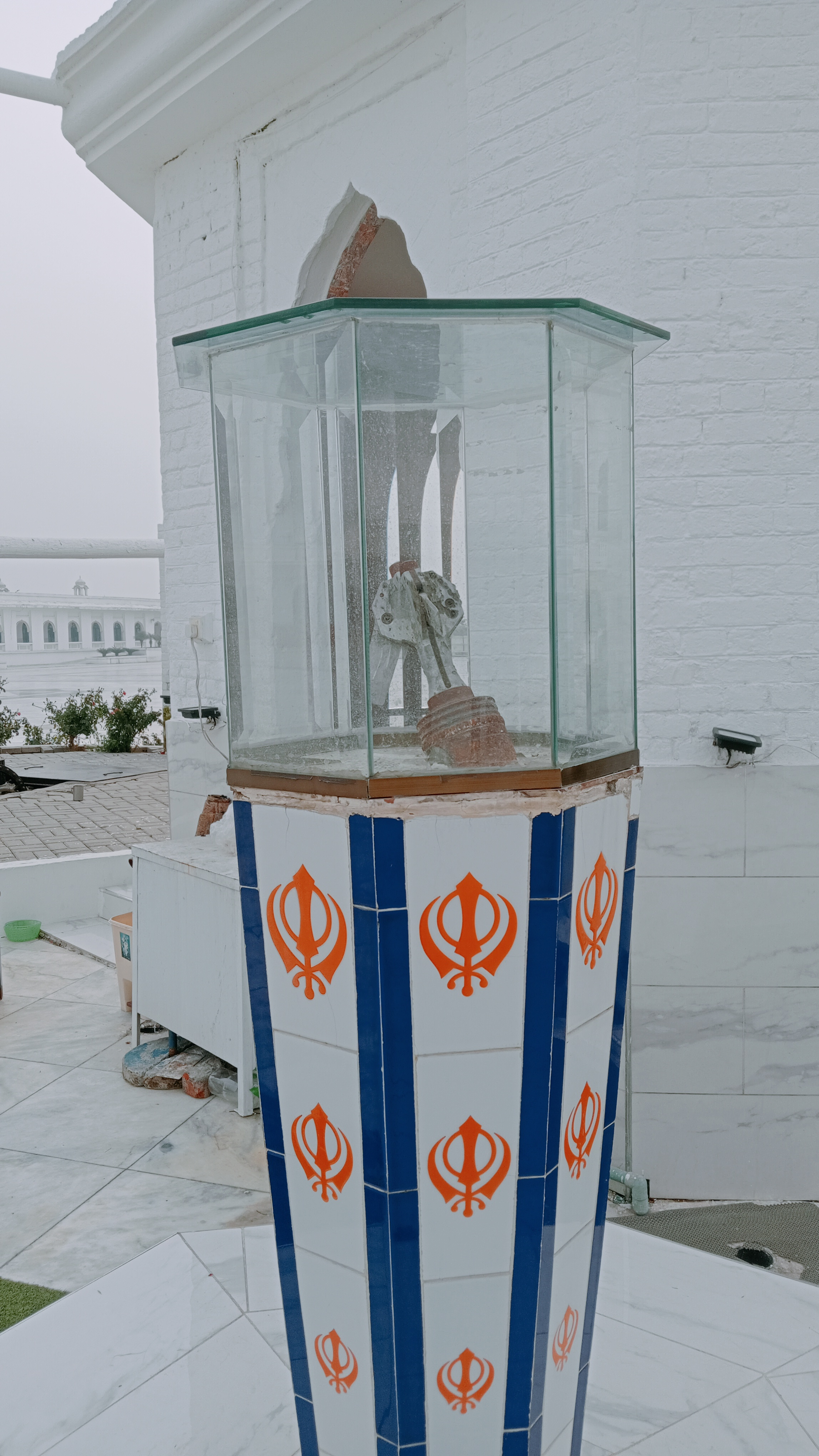
An unexploded bomb placed inside Gurdwara Darbar Sahib Kartarpur

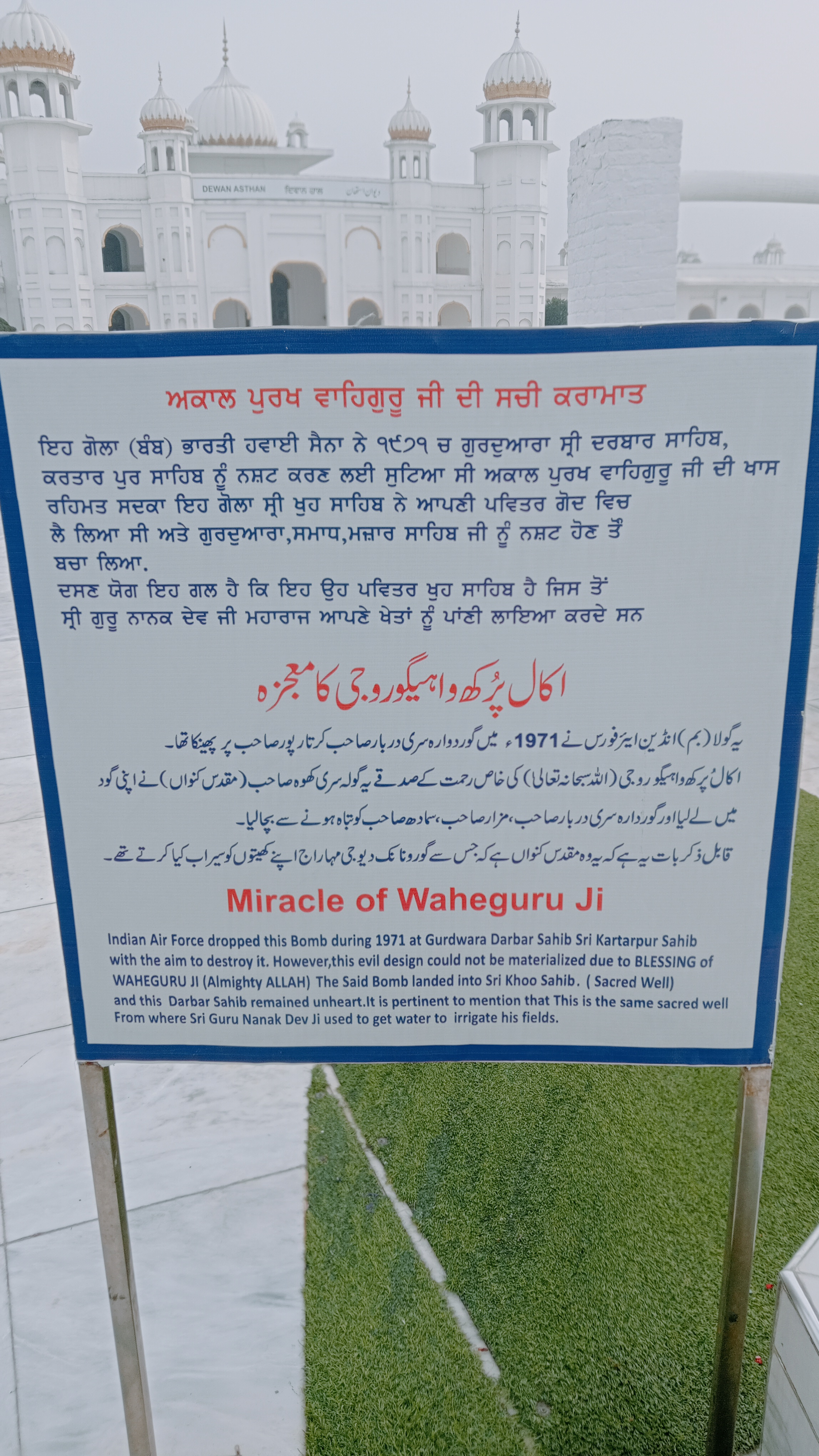
Bomb Banner inside Gurdwara Darbar Sahib Kartarpur

== Registration process ==
The corridor does not require a visa to use, but an Electronic Travel Authority (ETA) document is required, which can be obtained by registering an application at a dedicated website of the Indian government. Even with a USD$20 fee waiver for all for two days i.e. 9 and 12 November, initial turnout was low due to the complicated booking process and the fact that many Indian citizens lack passports. Aam Aadmi Party, BJP Indore MP Shankar Lalwani, The former DSGMC president and SGPC demanded that the Indian government simplify the process.

Important conditions of travel include:

- Only Indian passport holders or OCI card holders can travel by corridor, Pakistanis cannot.
- Children or aged persons of all ages can register to apply.
- After 15 days of travel by corridor another registration can be done for second visit.
- Registration can only be done online at the above-mentioned website of the Indian government.
- Overnight stay is not allowed

== Reception ==
Lahore-based historian Fakir S. Aijazuddin said the corridor is a "unique experiment" in cross-border ties between India and Pakistan. The corridor has been described as Guru Nanak's legacy project depicting his way of living life. A special episode was dedicated to the corridor in the Hindi TV series Kullfi Kumarr Bajewala. Sunny Deol stated that the corridor would help maintain peace between India and Pakistan. Many Sikh pilgrims credited Pakistani PM Imran Khan and former Indian Punjab minister Sidhu for the corridor's opening. The State Department of the United States also welcomed the opening of the corridor.

After visiting the Pakistani side in February 2020 Antonio Guterres, the United Nations Secretary-General, called it the "symbol of interfaith harmony" and "a corridor of hope, connecting two key Sikh pilgrimage sites."

== Facilities ==
RailTel Corporation of India launched the free RailWire Wi-Fi service to pilgrims at Dera Baba Nanak railway station and Integrated Check Post. Jalandhar based Republic Motors provided six campus electric carts for travel of pilgrims from Integrated Check Post (ICP) to zero point. On 8 November 2019, Delhi CM Arvind Kejriwal announced that the Government of Delhi will bear all expenses and cost of Kartarpur Sahib pilgrimage under Mukhyamantri Teerth Yatra Yojana.

== Proposals for similar corridors ==
There are several other proposals for opening of similar visa-free corridors to Sikh religious and historic places that are situated within 4 kilometers of international borders.

- Akal Takht Jathedar Giani Harpreet Singh demanded a same visa-free access corridor at Dera Baba Nanak, India for Pakistani Sikhs to visit and pay obeisance at Gurudwara Sri Darbar Sahib at Dera Baba Nanak.
- Corridor to Gurdwara Rori Sahib, Eminabad, the historic gurudwara of Guru Nanak and Bhai Mardana at Jahman Village near Lahore.
- Corridor to Gurdwara Lahura Sahib, outside Ghawind village near Lahore.
- Corridor to Gurudwara Jhari Sahib, the historic gurudwara associated with Guru Amar Das at Tergay village in Kasur District.
- Corridor to historic Gurdwara Bhai Bahlol at Qadiwind village in Kasur District.
- Corridor to Gurudwara Chhevin Patshahi Sri Guru Hargobind Sahib at Padhana village near Lahore.
- There has been a request by the Kashmiri Pandit community for a corridor allowing them to visit the Sharada Peeth temple. In March 2019, Pakistani media reported that Pakistan is exploring the possibility of a corridor for Indian pilgrims, and may be close to approving a plan. However, the Pakistani government has since said that a decision has not been made.
- A Western Pahari Corridor from Shimla to Murree has also been proposed under the Aman ki Asha initiative to link the similar Western Pahari language-based regions of Himachal Pradesh, Jammu, Azad Kashmir and Pothohar Plateau for boosting commercial and cultural ties.
- Similar corridor is proposed for Hindus and Jains to the Umerkot and Tharparkar districts of Sindh, as they have prominent temples like the Umarkot Shiv Mandir, Nagarparkar Jain temples etc.

== See also ==
- List of Gurdwaras in Pakistan
