= Kartarpur, Pakistan =

Town in Punjab, Pakistan and a holy site in Sikhism

Kartarpur کرتار پور
- Town in Pakistan
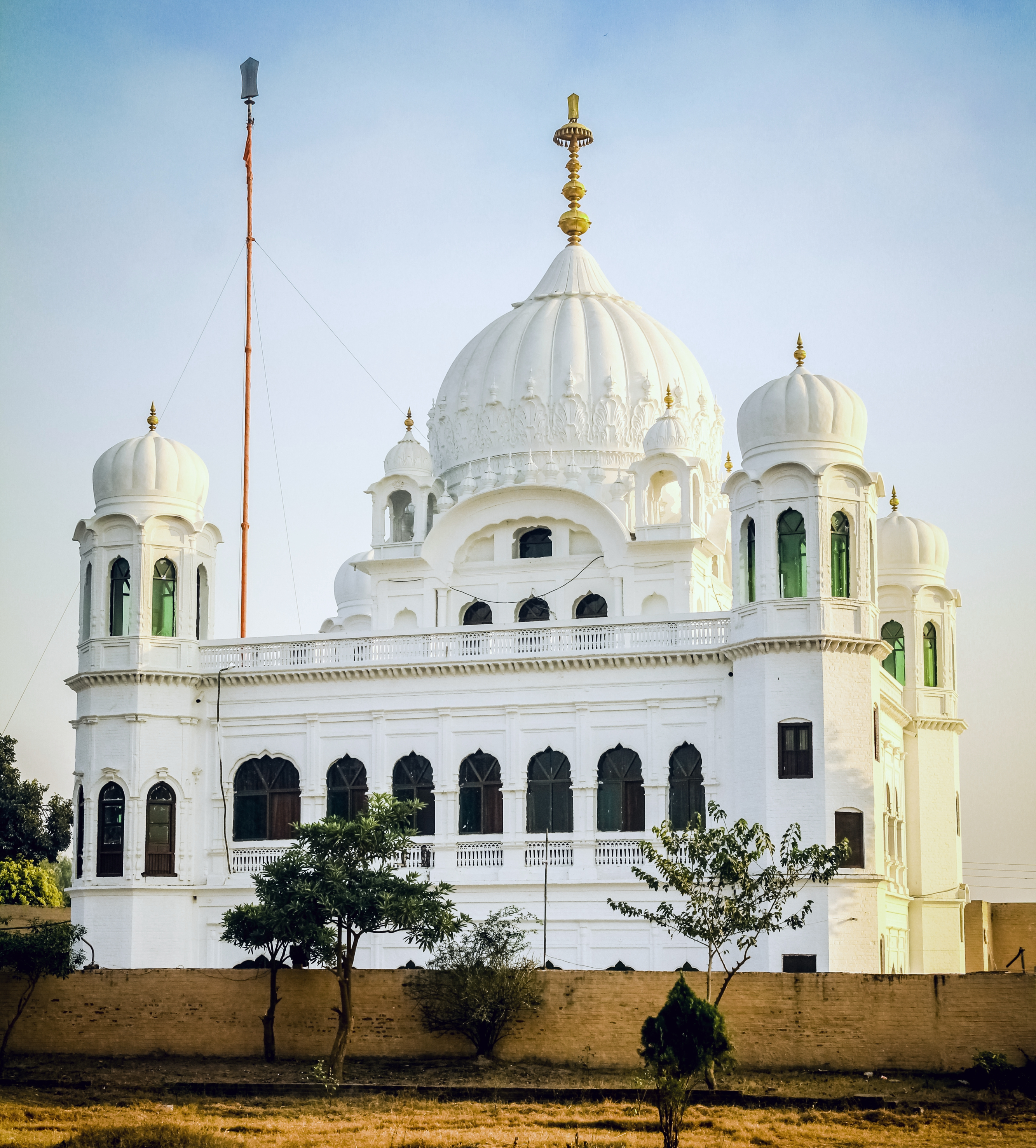
- The Gurdwara Darbar Sahib Kartar Pur was built to commemorate the spot where Guru Nanak is said to have died.

- Location within Pakistan Location within Punjab, Pakistan
- Coordinates: 32.08°N 75.01°E
- Country: Pakistan
- Province: (Punjab, Pakistan) Punjab
- District: Narowal
- Tehsil: Shakargarh
- Founder: Guru Nanak
- Elevation: 155 m (509 ft)
- Time zone: UTC+5 (PST)

Kartarpur, Pakistan
- Punjabi language
- Gurmukhi: ਕਰਤਾਰਪੁਰ
- Transliteration: kartārpur
- Shahmukhi: کرتار پور
- Transliteration: kartārpur
- IPA: [kɐɾˈt̪äɾᵊ ˈpuːɾᵊ]

Kartarpur (Punjabi / Urdu: کرتار پور; pronounced [kɐɾˈt̪äɾᵊ ˈpuːɾᵊ]) is a border town 102 km from Lahore in the Shakargarh Tehsil, Narowal District in Punjab, Pakistan. Located on the right bank of the Ravi River, it is said to have been founded by Guru Nanak, the first guru of Sikhism, who established the first Sikh commune there.

== Etymology ==
The name Kartārpur means "Creator's town".

== Geography ==
Kartarpur is located at 32°5′13″N 75°1′0″E, at an average elevation of 155 metres (511 feet). It lies upon the western banks of the Ravi River, opposite the town of Dera Baba Nanak, a sacred town in Sikhism.

== History ==
The first Guru of Sikhism, Guru Nanak, founded Kartarpur in 1504 CE on the right bank of the Ravi River with financial support from Karori, a wealthy Khatri convert. Other sources place its year of founding to c. 1520. It became the site of the first Sikh commune, where Guru Nanak settled with his family. After his death in 1539, both Hindus and Muslims claimed him as their own, and each group constructed a mausoleum—separated by a common wall—at his final resting place.

=== Partition ===
Before the Partition of India in 1947, Kartarpur was part of Gurdaspur District in British Punjab. The district was divided into four tehsils: Gurdaspur, Shakargarh, Pathankot, and Batala. Following the partition, the district itself was split between India and Pakistan. The Radcliffe Line allocated Shakargarh Tehsil, including Kartarpur on the right bank of the Ravi River, to Pakistan. The remaining tehsils—Gurdaspur, Pathankot, and Batala—located on the left bank, were awarded to India.

== Demography ==
The population is primarily Punjabi.

=== Sikhism ===
At the location Guru Nanak is believed to have died, the Gurdwara Kartarpur Sahib was built. It is considered to be the second holiest site for the Sikh religion.

The changing course of the Ravi River eventually washed away the mausoleums. Guru Nanak's son saved the urn containing his ashes and reburied it on the left bank of the river, where a new habitation was formed, the Dera Baba Nanak. After Nanak's passing, the early Sikh community's headquarters was shifted from Kartarpur to the village of Khadur by his successor, Guru Angad.

== Transport ==
The town was connected by a historical railway station 'Darbar Sahib Kartarpur', linked by a branch line to Narowal Junction railway station. The line was closed back in 2000, leading to the deserting of the track and damage to the station building.

=== Kartarpur Corridor ===
On 9 November 2019, Prime Minister Imran Khan inaugurated the opening of a cross-border Kartarpur Corridor allowing Sikhs and all other Indians to visit Pakistan without a visa. On the same day, the first Jatha (batch) of over 500 Indian pilgrims visited the shrine thanking Prime Minister Khan for "respecting the sentiments of India" towards the shrine across the border that marks the final resting place of Sikhism founder Guru Nanak Dev.

== See also ==
- Gurdwara Darbar Sahib Kartarpur
- Kartarpur Corridor
- Nankana Sahib
- Dera Baba Nanak
