= National Highway 354B (India) =

National highway in India

National Highway 354B
- Map of National Highway 354B in red

Route information
- Auxiliary route of NH 54
- Length: 6.00 km (3.73 mi)

Major junctions
- From: Dera baba nanak
- To: Indo Pak border

Location
- Country: India
- States: Punjab

Highway system
- Roads in India; Expressways; National; State; Asian
← NH 354	→ NH %route%

National Highway 354B, commonly referred to as NH 354B, is a national highway in India. It is a spur road of National Highway 54 in the state of Punjab in India.

This highway was removed from the list of national highways on 27 February 2018 and got absorbed in Punjab State Highway 20. Subsequently, on 21 January 2019, another highway was designated as 354B. This starts from its junction with NH-354 near Dera Baba Nanak and terminates at Indo-Pak border in the State of Punjab.

== Route ==
Dera Baba Nanak to Indo-Pak Border, connecting with the Kartarpur Corridor on the other side.

== Junctions ==
- NH 354 near Dera Baba Nanak

== See also ==
- List of national highways in India
- List of national highways in India by state
