= Gurdwara Beri Sahib =

Gurdwara in Punjab, Pakistan

Babe De Ber Gurdwara
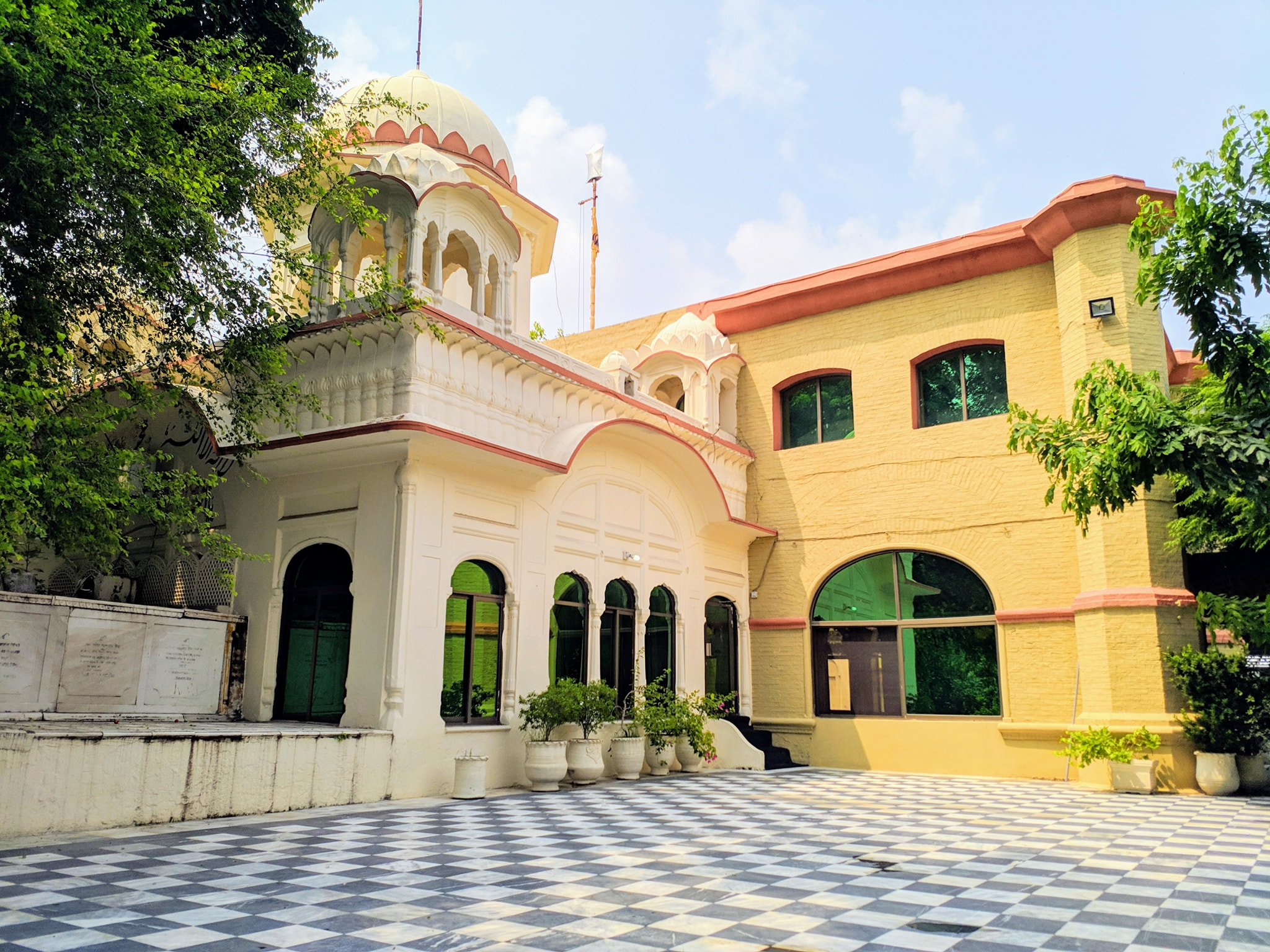
- Main shrine

- Location within Punjab, Pakistan Location within Pakistan Location within Asia

Religion
- Affiliation: Sikhism
- District: Sialkot District

Location
- Location: Babey Beri
- State: Punjab
- Country: Pakistan
- Interactive map of Babe De Ber Gurdwara
- Coordinates: 32°28′51.7″N 74°32′56.0″E

Gurdawara Bair Sahib, also called Baba Beri or Baba Bair, or Gurdwara Babe Di Ber, is situated in Sialkot, Pakistan.

== History ==
It was the place where Baba Guru Nanak stayed and met Hamza Ghaus, a famous saint of Sialkot. The berry tree under which Guru Nanak stayed is still present. The gurdwara was built by Natha Singh and it includes a garden, a pool and residential rooms. The gurdwara was damaged in the wake of the Babari Masjid dispute. There used to be a very high temple which was razed to the ground when it was demolished by an unruly mob.

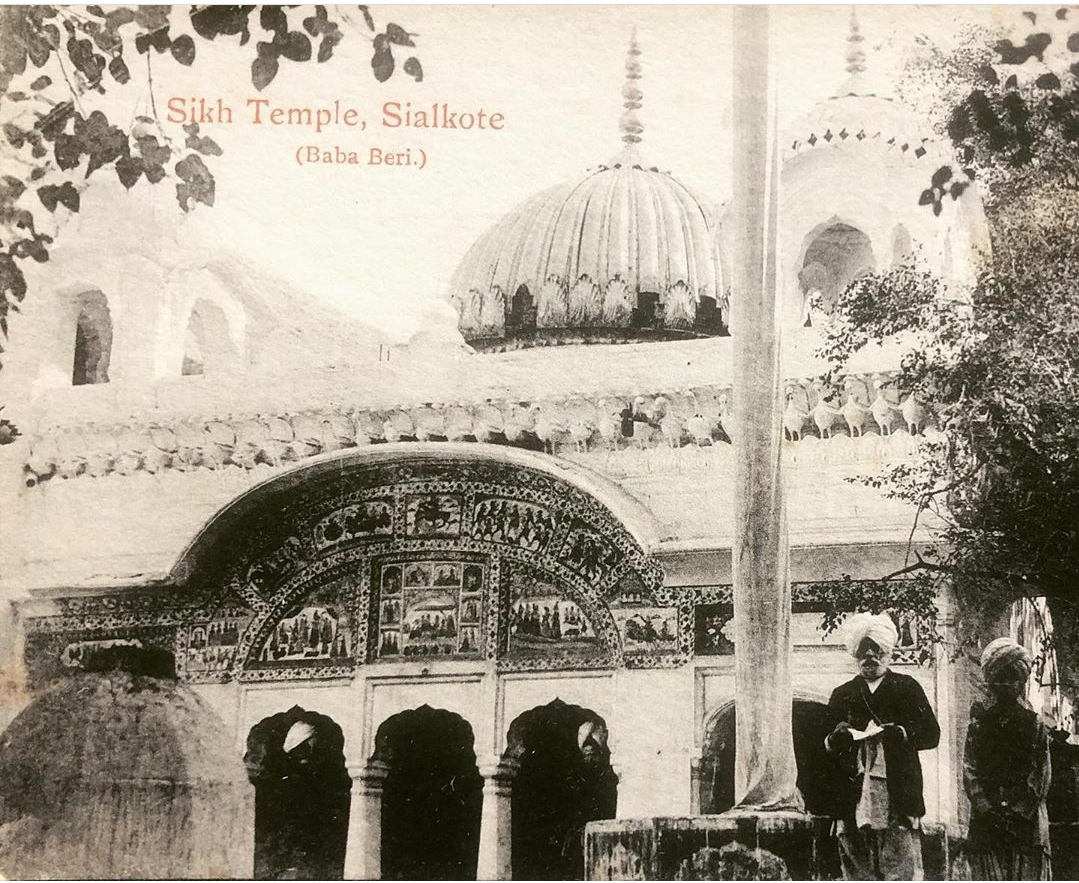
Photograph of Gurdwara Beri Sahib, Sialkot, ca.1910

The gurdwara was renovated during the 2010s and opened for pilgrims. Access to the gurdwara to Indian Sikh pilgrims was restored in November 2012.

== Gallery ==
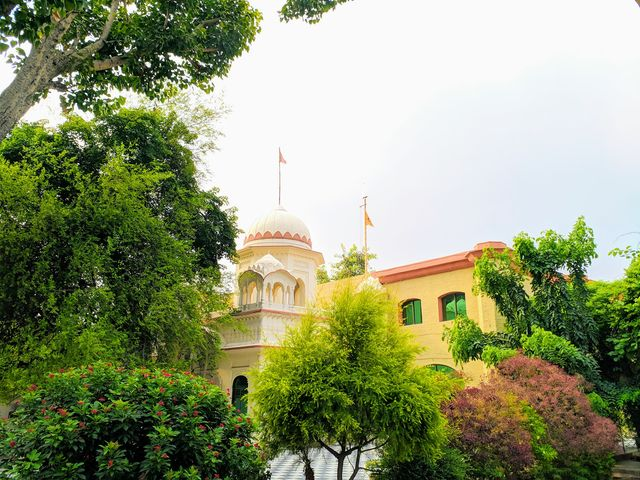
A view of Gurudwara Beri Sahib

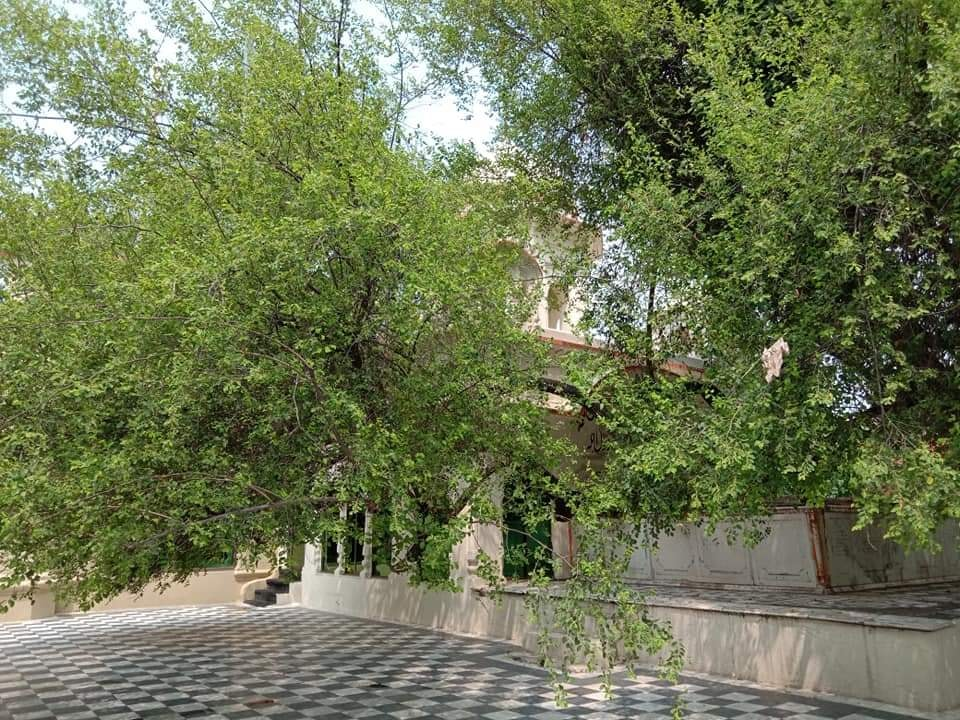
Bairi Sahib tree at Gurudwara Beri Sahib

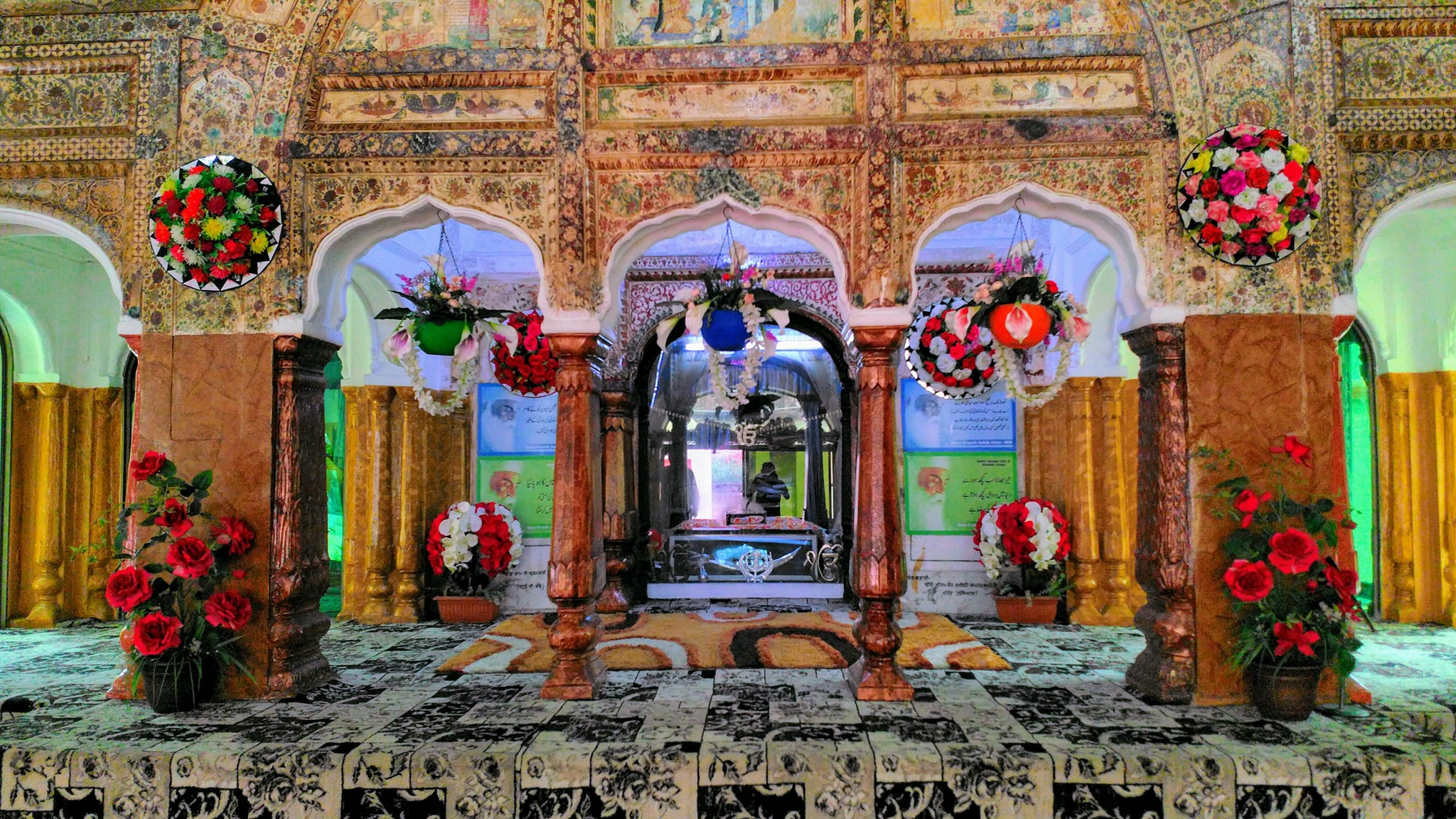
Main Deewan Hall at Gurudwara Beri Sahib

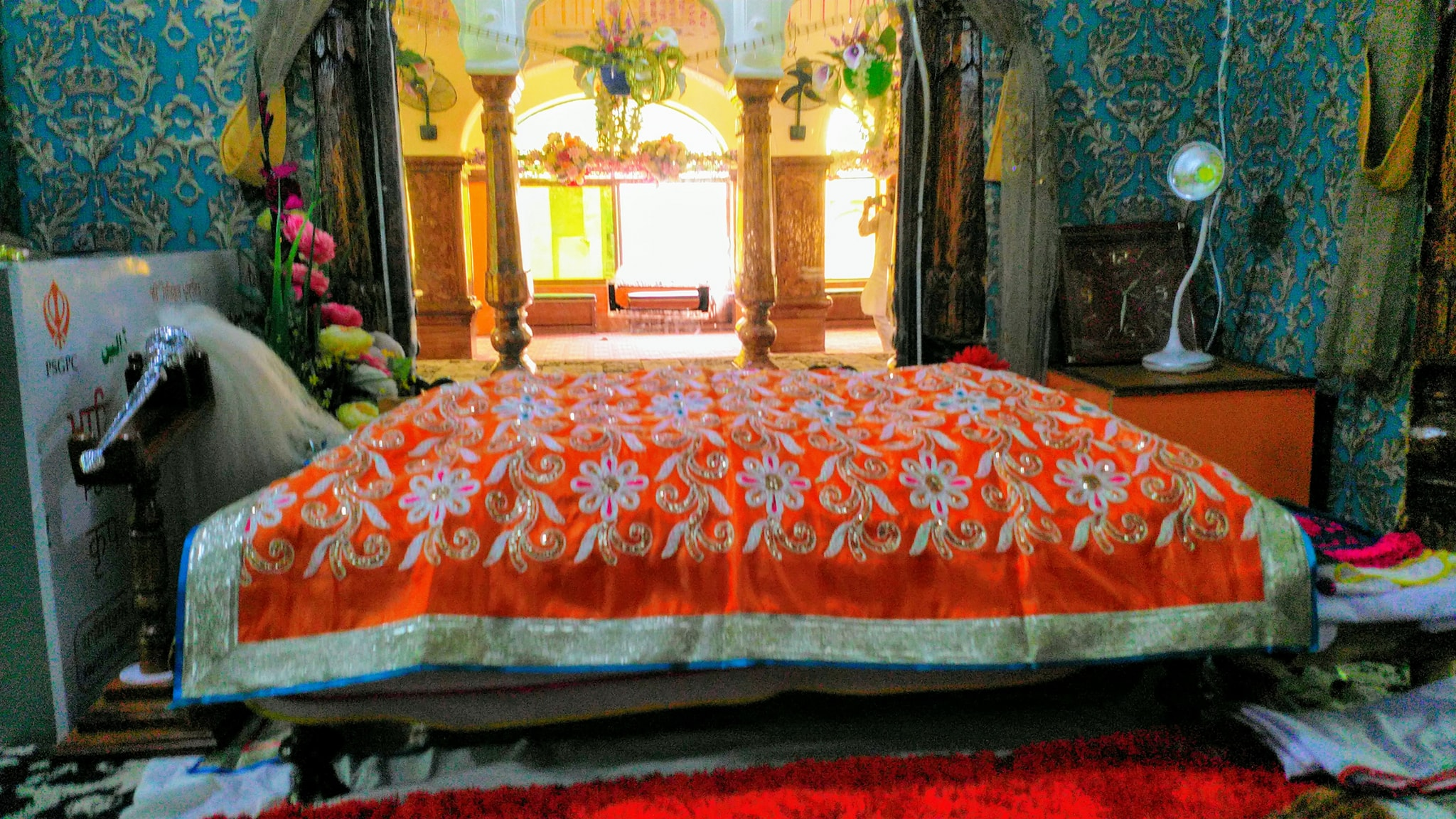
Parkash Asthan at Gurudwara Beri Sahib

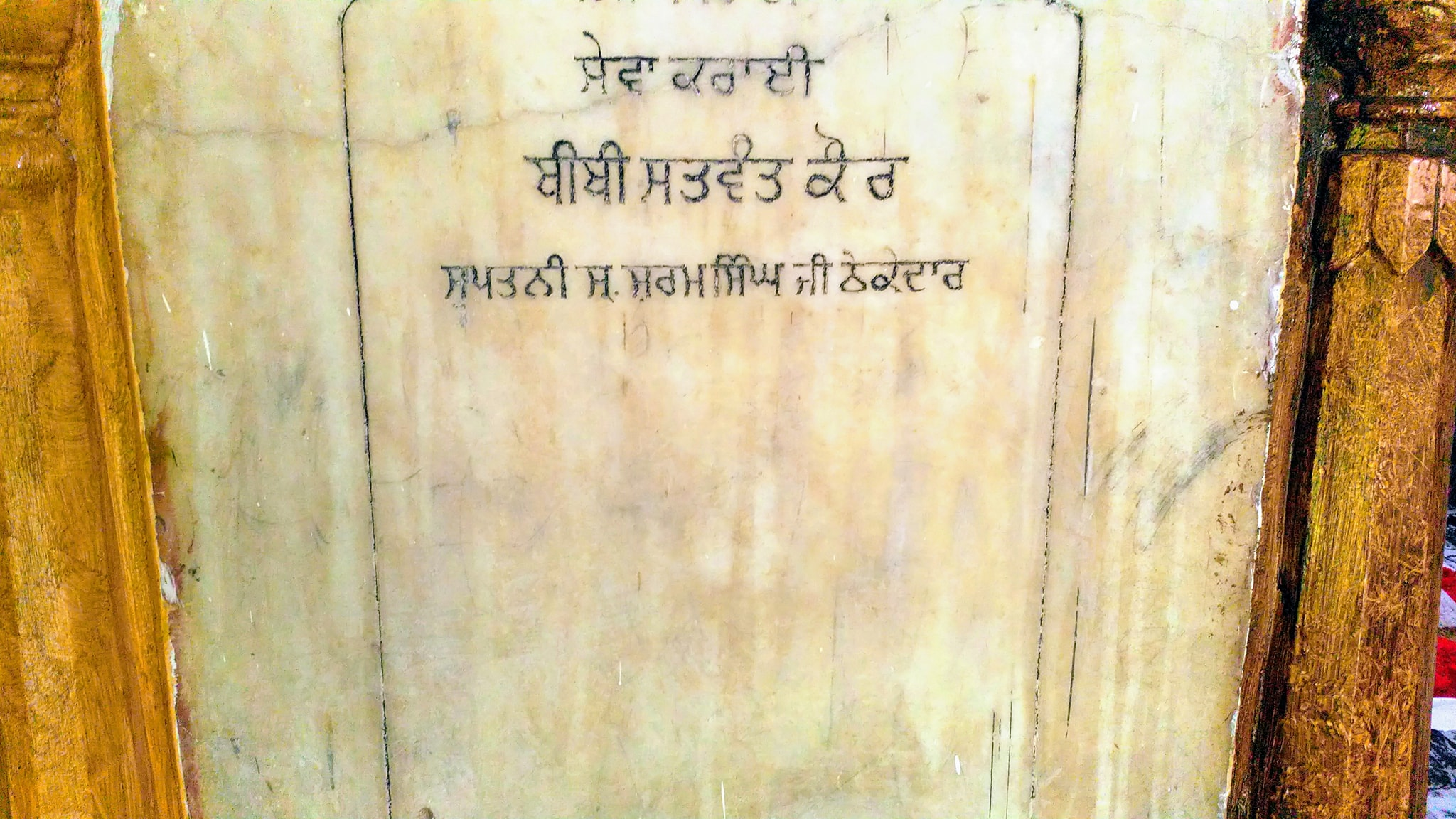
Sewa plate at Gurdwara Beri Sahib

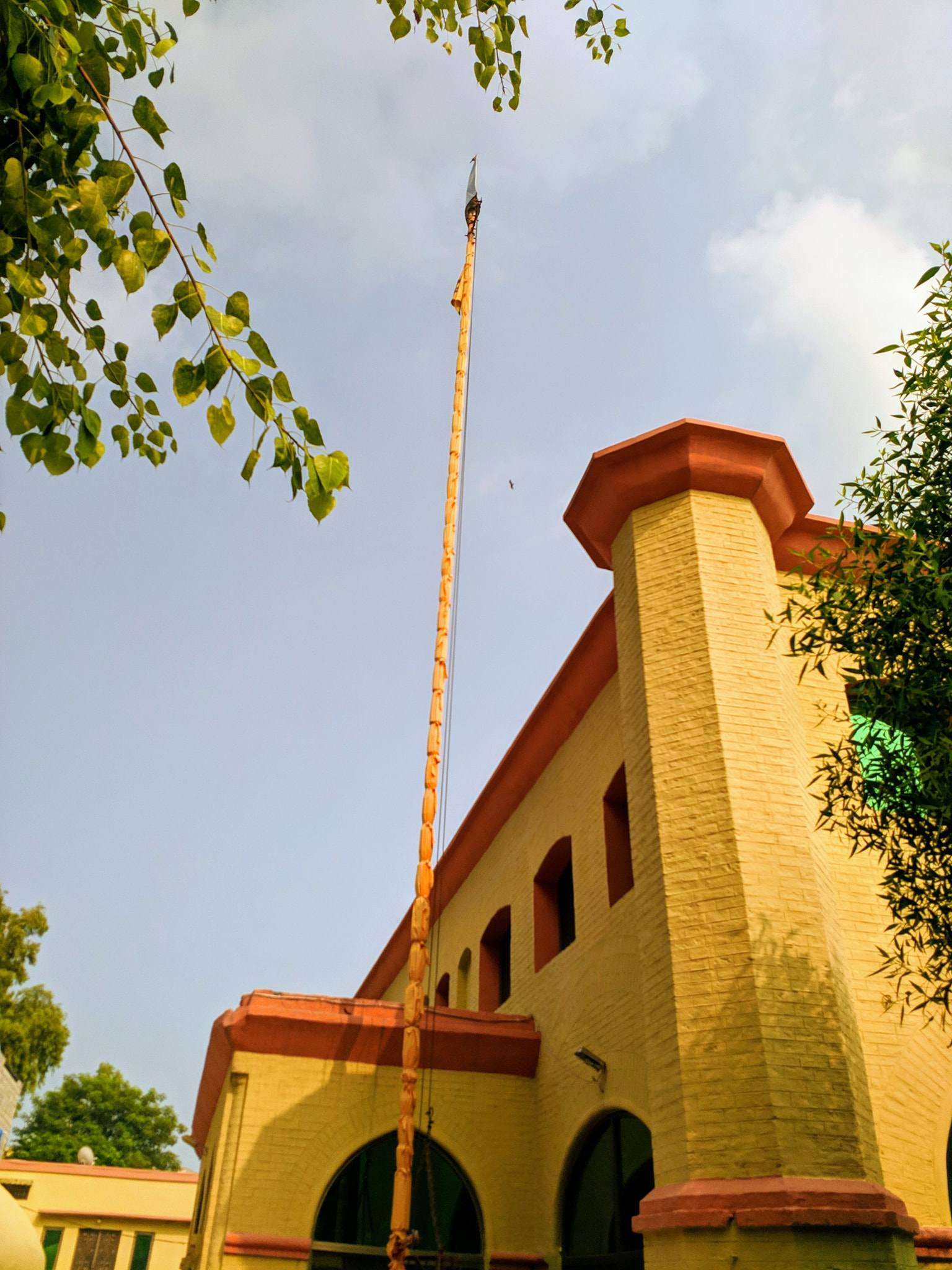
Nishan Sahib at Gurudwara Beri Sahib

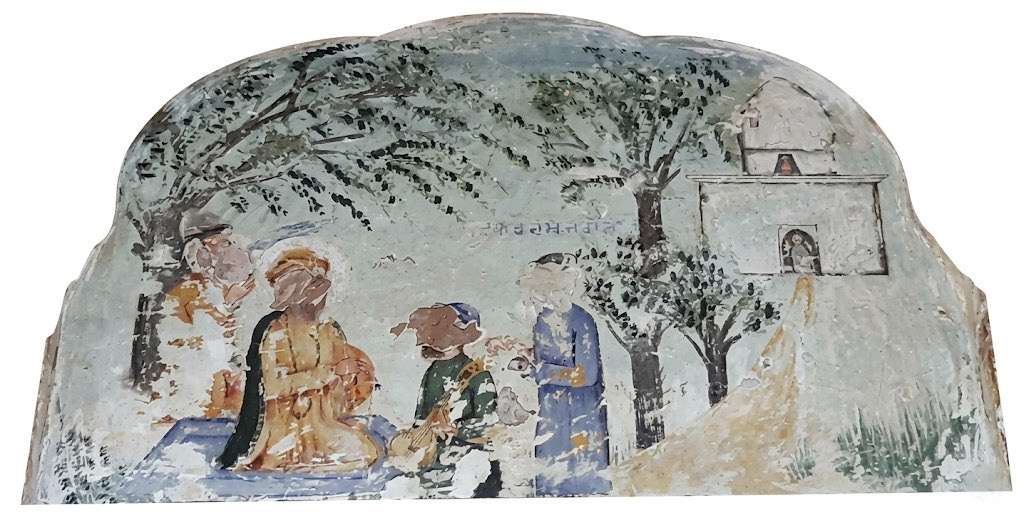
Fresco depicting Guru Nanak meeting Hazrat Hamza Ghaus, from Gurdwara Babe-di-Ber, Sialkot, circa 19th century

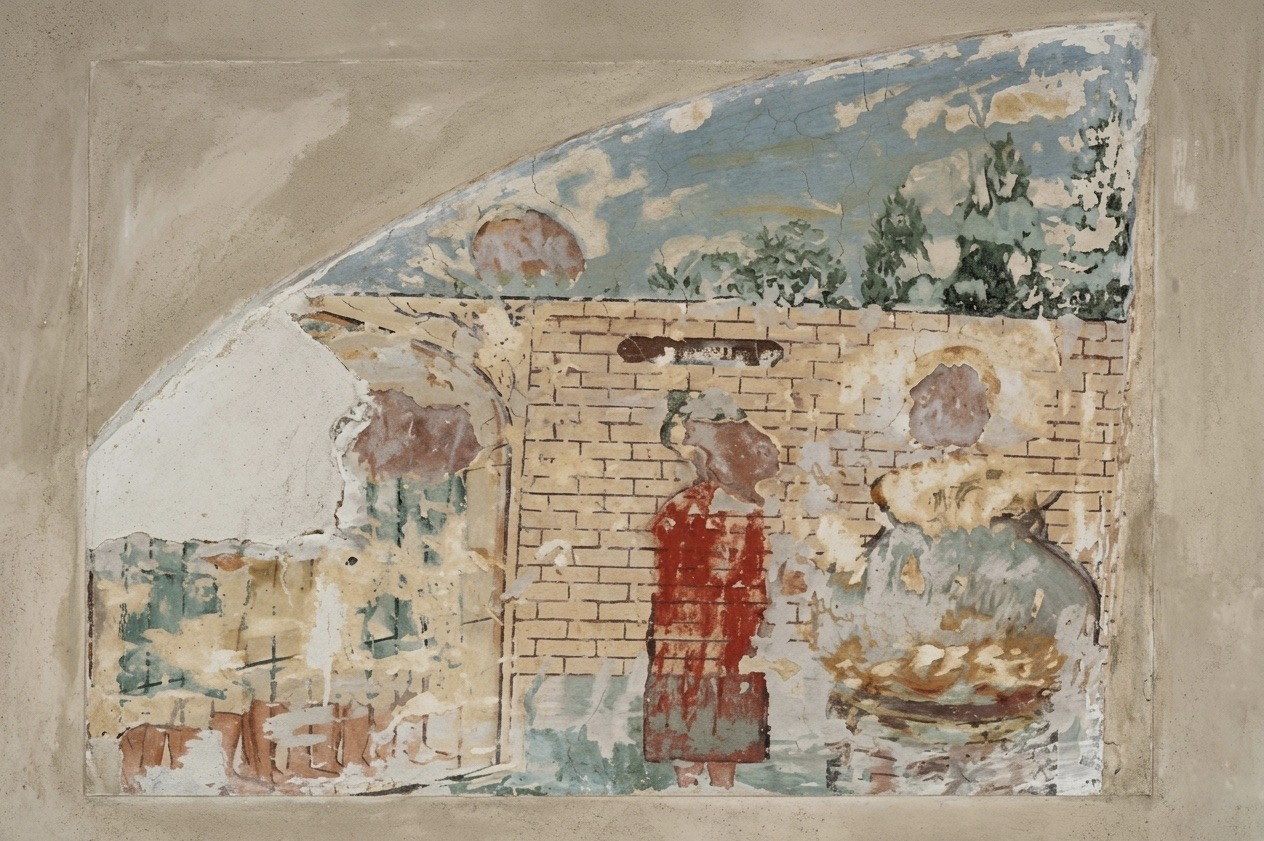
Fresco depicting an individual being boiled alive in a large pot, from Gurdwara Babe-di-Ber, Sialkot, circa 19th century

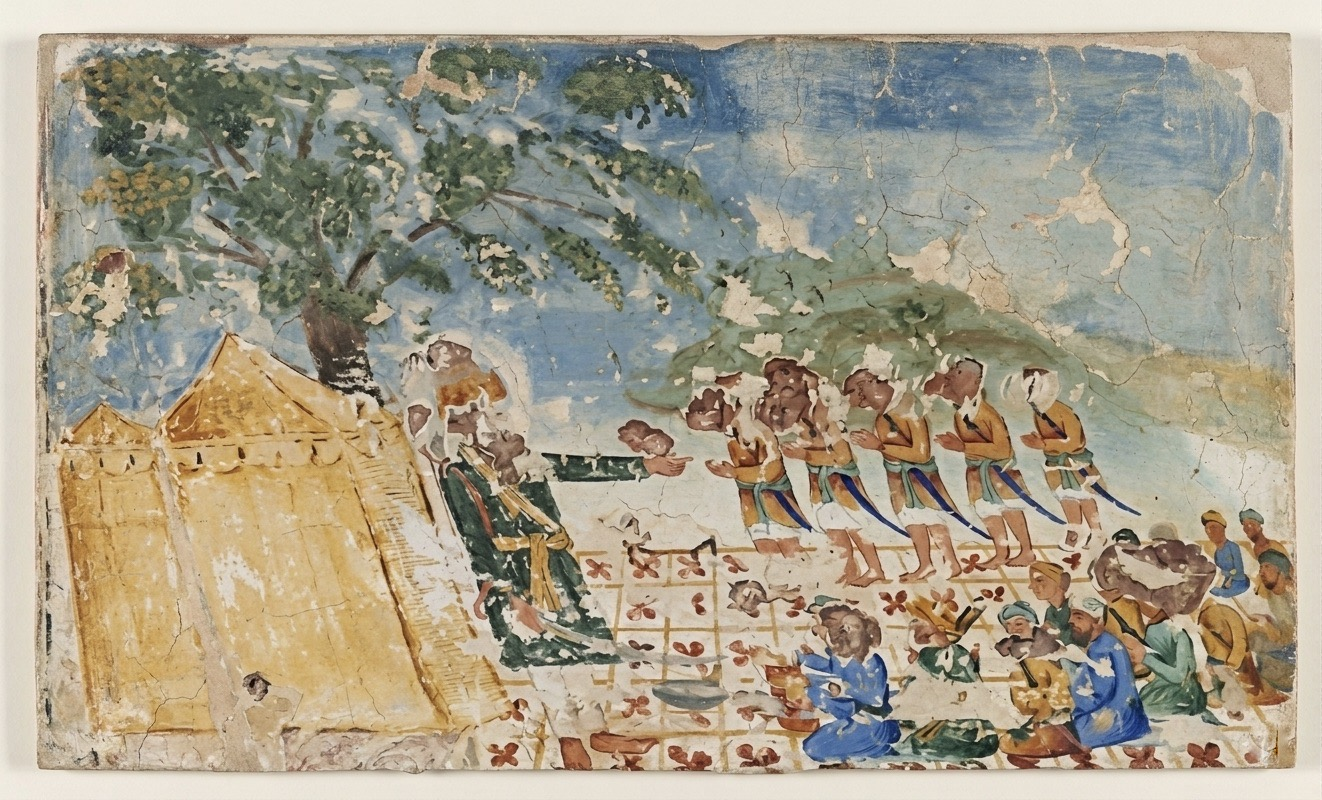
Fresco depicting Guru Gobind Singh formalizing the Khalsa Panth with the Panj Piare at Anandpur Sahib, from Gurdwara Babe-di-Ber, Sialkot, circa 19th century

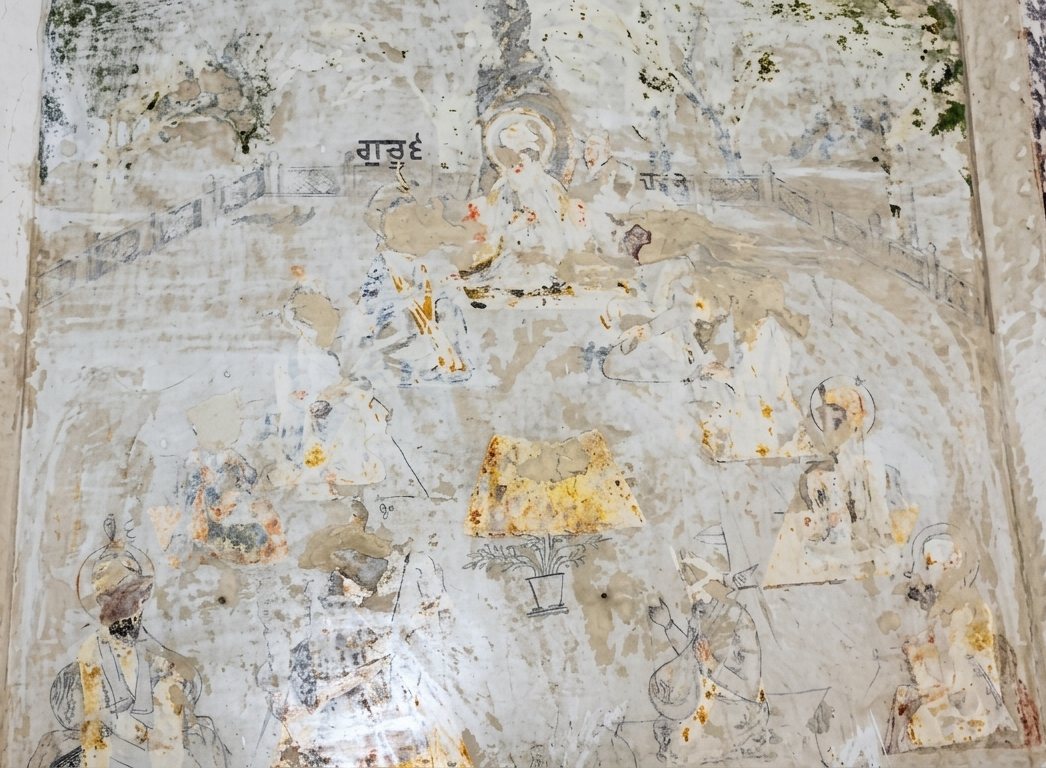
Fresco depicting the ten Sikh gurus, from Gurdwara Babe-di-Ber, Sialkot, circa 19th century

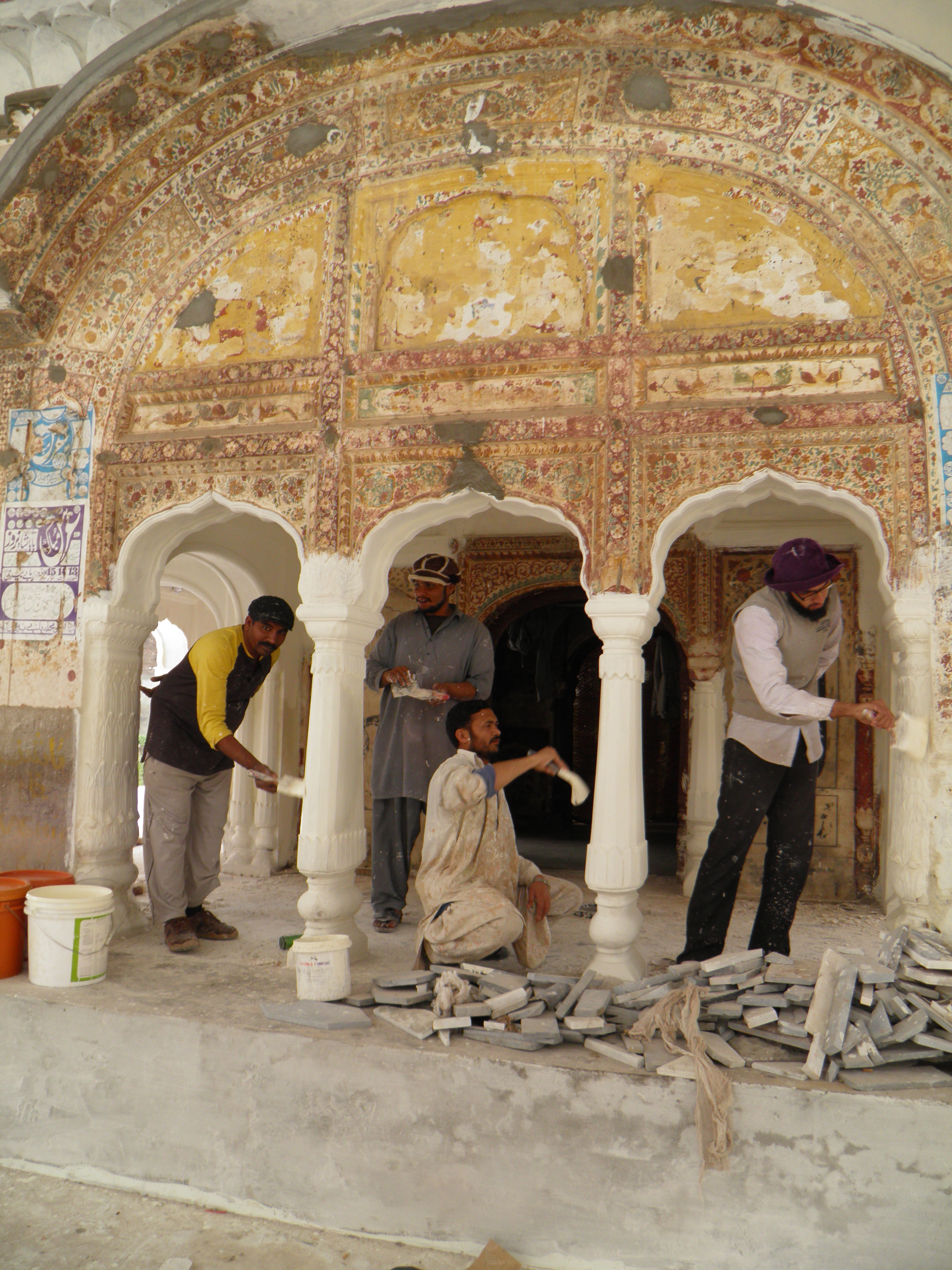
The gurdwara being restored in the 2010s

== See also ==
- Sialkot
