= Gurdwara Rori Sahib, Eminabad =

Gurdwara Rori Sahib
- Location within Punjab, Pakistan Location within India Location within Asia

Religion
- Affiliation: Sikhism

Location
- Location: Eminabad, Gujranwala
- State: Punjab
- Country: Pakistan
- Interactive map of Gurdwara Rori Sahib
- Coordinates: 32°02′51″N 74°14′56″E

Gurdwara Rori Sahib is a gurdwara in Eminabad, Gujranwala, Punjab, Pakistan. It was built during the reign of Ranjit Singh. The gurdwara remains in operation.
