= List of temples in Lahore =

Temples in Lahore لہور لاہور
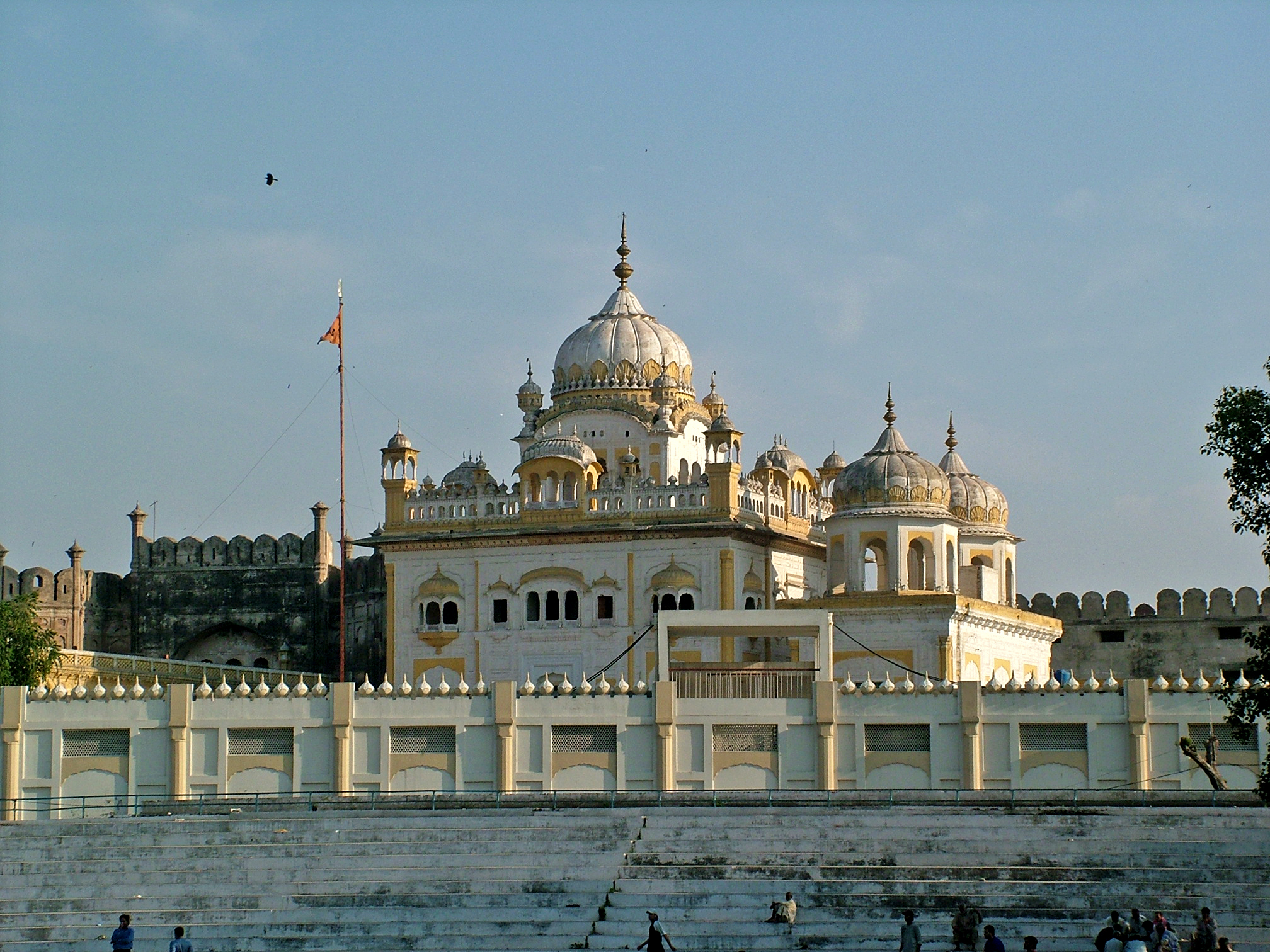
- Samadhi of Ranjit Singh

- Location in Pakistan
- Coordinates: 31°32′59″N 74°20′37″E
- Country: Pakistan
- Province: Punjab
- Elevation: 217 m (712 ft)
- Time zone: UTC+5 (PKT)
- Postal code: 54000
- Dialling code: 042
- Lahore Cantonment is a legally separate military-administered settlement.

Lahore is the capital of Punjab, the most populous province of Pakistan. The city contains many Hindu, Sikh, and Jain temples. Only two of its Hindu temples remain public places of Hindu worship. Despite Lahore having a large Hindu and Sikh population prior to 1947, the partition of India led to the vast majority of these residents migrating to the Republic of India, leaving many of their places of worship abandoned. Since then, the remaining sites have been repurposed as residences, schools, mosques, or been demolished. In recent-times, some former temples have been restored to their original function.

== History ==
Lahore was a rich cosmopolitan history and was the principal city of the vast plain of the entire Punjab region for many centuries, and was the capital of the Sikh Empire of Maharaja Ranjit Singh until the mid-1850s when it was conquered by the British. Before the partition of British India in 1947, Lahore had a large Hindu, Sikh and Jain population. In 1941, 64.5% of the population of Lahore was Muslim, while about 36% was Hindu or Sikh. At that time, the city contained numerous Hindu temples, Jain temples, and Sikh gurdwaras. The overwhelming majority of Lahore and West Punjab's non-Christian minority population fled to India at Partition, while East Punjab was similarly depopulated of almost its entire Muslim population. For example, on the eve of Partition, Amritsar was about 49% Muslim, whereas in the 1951 census, the figure had dropped to only 0.52%, while Ludhiana was 63% Muslim prior to Partition, but 97% Hindu and Sikh in the 1961 census. As a result of religious demographic changes and political tensions, almost all Hindu and Jain temples have been abandoned in Lahore, although several important Sikh shrines continue to operate.

The condition of temples in Lahore is not good, it is not like that the city lack temples but they are not maintained so much as Hindus migrated from Lahore in 1947 en masse. In 1992 after demolition of Babri Masjid, in Pakistan especially in Lahore, temples were attacked and destroyed, many temples were completely destructed. Only two temples remain function as public Hindu places of worship in the city, with there being numerous abandoned and dilapidated temples.

== Hindu temples ==
=== Functional Hindu temples ===
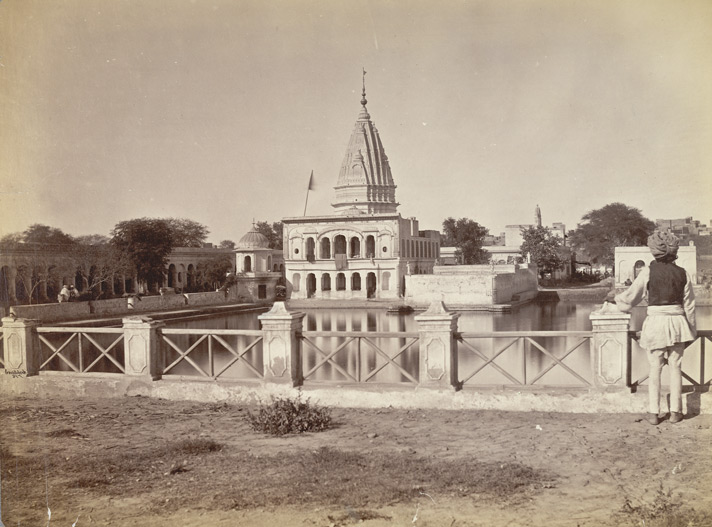
Rattan Chand Temple, Lahore in 1880

Only two Hindu temples are currently functional in Lahore.

- Krishna Mandir, Lahore at Ravi Road,
- Valmiki Mandir, Lahore or Neela Gumbad Mandir, only functional temple in lahore besides Krishna temple

=== Former Hindu temples ===
The following Hindu temples lay abandoned or were destroyed:

- Akbari Mandi Temple
- Arya Samaj Temple
- Bhairav ka Asthan, Ichhra
- Bal Mata Temple at Shah Almi
- Chand Raat Temple, Ichhra
- Doodhwali Mata Tample (between Shah Almi and Lohari gate)
- Lava Temple (son of Ram– According to Hindu legend, Lahore is named after him)
- Mahadev, there is a Bhairav temple also
- Mandir Wachhowali
- Mela Ram Talao Temple
- Model Town B Block Temple
- Model Town D Block Temple
- Ramgali Temple
- Rattan Chand Temple, Old Anarkali and its former temple tank currently a grassy field known as Azad Park.
- Sati Mata Manhala
- Sheetla Temple, Mohalla Chiri Marian, Shah Almi
- Tulsi Mandir, Mohalla Chiri Marian, Shah Almi
- Aitchison College Temple
- Bhadrakali Temple, Gulzar Colony (Now a School)
- Basuli Hanuman Temple, Old Anarkali
- Devi ka Asthan, Lohari Gate
- Lala Nihal Chand Temple (Abandoned)

== Jain temples ==
=== Functional Jain temples ===
- Jain Digambar temple, Lahore

=== Former Jain temples ===
Most of the Jain temples in Lahore are either abandoned or destroyed.

- Jain Śvetāmbara Temple with Shikhar, Thari Bhabrian
- Jain Digambar Temple with Shikhar, Thari Bhabrian
- Jain Śvetāmbara Dada Wadi (Mini Temple), Guru Mangat in Lahore Cantt
- Jain Digambar Temple with Shikhar, Old Anarkali (Jain Mandir Chawk)
- Aitchison College Jain Mandir

== Sikh gurdwaras ==
Of the over 200 historical Sikh sites that have been documented in Pakistan, mostly in Punjab, forty-four are known to exist in Lahore district.

=== Good-condition or functioning gurdwaras and other sites ===
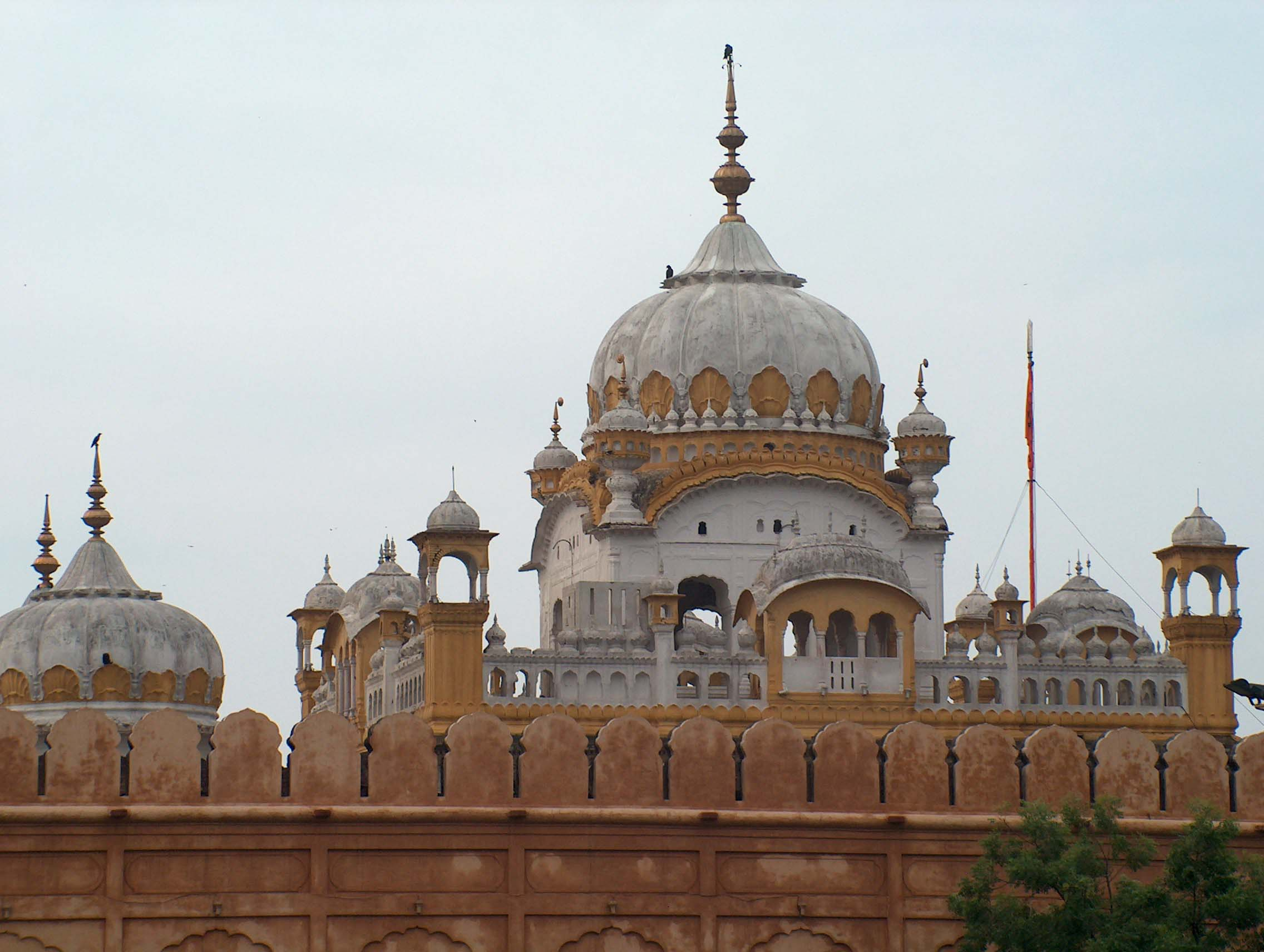
Samadhi of Ranjit Singh

Several of Lahore's gurdwaras remain in good-condition or are still functioning as Sikh places of worship, including:

- Samadhi of Ranjit Singh (including the samadhis of Kharak Singh, Naunihal Singh, and Jind Kaur, (Note: Jind Kaur's samadh is now demolished.) 31°35'21.4"N 74°18'41.3"E)
- Gurdwara Dera Sahib (31°35'23.3"N, 74°18'42.5"E)
- Gurdwara Janam Asthan Guru Ram Das (31°35'05.6"N 74°19'15.9"E)
- In Shahidganj (in Naulakha Bazaar):
  - Gurdwara Shahid Ganj Bhai Taru Singh (on the site of the former Shaheed Ganj Mosque, 31°34'44.5"N, 74°19'54.9"E)
  - Gurdwara Shahid Ganj Singh Singhania (31°34'42.8"N 74°19'55.4"E)
- Gurdwara Shaheedganj Bhai Mani Singh, located opposite the Masti Gate of Lahore Fort (31°35'13.2"N, 74°19'02.4"E)
- Gurdwara Bhai Duni Chand Patshahi Pehli, Sirianwala Bazar of Chuhatta Jawar Mal (31°34'55.0"N 74°19'22.1"E)
- Gurdwara Dera Chahal Patshahi Pehli, in Dera Chahal village (31°26'37.6"N 74°28'19.5"E)
- Gurdwara Mozang Patshahi Chhevin, on Temple Road in Mozang (31°33'19.6"N, 74°18'57.8"E)
- Grave of Princess Bamba Sutherland, Gora Cemetery (31°32'06.6"N 74°20'58.5"E)

=== Poor-condition, re-purposed, abandoned, or lost gurdwaras and other sites ===
The following gurdwaras have been re-purposed or are abandoned or have disappeared:

- Gurdwara Nanakgarh Patshahi Pehli (31°36'22.6"N 74°19'23.5"E)
- Gurdwara Boali Patshahi Teeji, opposite of Multani Mohalla (31°35'04.7"N 74°19'16.4"E)
- Gurdwara Rori Sahib, Jahman village (31°21'20.6"N 74°32'02.5"E)
- Gurdwara Chota Nankana Patshahi Pehli, Manga village (31°18'26.8"N 74°04'40.4"E)
- Gurdwara Ghowindi Sahib Patshahi Pehli, Ghowindi village (31°24'22.6"N 74°34'53.6"E):
- Gurdwara Dharamsal Patshahi Chauthi (31°35'06.2"N 74°19'15.0"E)
- Gurdwara Diwankhana Patshahi Panjvin (31°35'06.2"N 74°19'15.0"E)
- Gurdwara Boali Patshahi Panjvin, behind the Sunehri Masjid (31°34'59.0"N 74°19'09.9"E)
- Gurdwara Lal Khoo Patshahi Panjvin (31°34'41.4"N 74°19'20.1"E)
- Gurdwara Chumalla Patshahi Chhevin, inside Bhatti Gate in Mohalla Chumalla on Gurdwara Gali (31°34'50.7"N, 74°18'30.3"E)
- Gurdwara Manji Sahib Patshahi Chhevin, outside Bhatti Gate (31°34'42.5"N 74°18'32.7"E)
- Gurdwara Shikargarh Patshahi Chhevin, next to the Suka Talab, adjacent to Gurdwara Road (31°33'02.8"N, 74°19'09.8"E)
- Gurdwara Guru Mangat Patshahi Chhevin, Mangat village (31°30'32.3"N, 74°21'14.1"E)
- Gurdwara Amar Sidhu Patshahi Chhevin, near Chungi Amar Sidhu (31°27'56.3"N 74°21'32.2"E)
- Gurdwara Jhallian Patshahi Chhevin, Jhalli village (31°28'28.7"N 74°33'57.7"E)
- Gurdwara Hudiara Patshahi Chhevin, Hudiara village (31°26'40.9"N, 74°33'57.7"E)
- Gurdwara Padhana Patshahi Chhevin, Padhana village (31°28'20.1"N 74°37'18.1"E)
- Gurdwara Rampura Khurd Patshahi Chhevin, Rampura Khurd village (31°26'00.4"N 74°36'15.6"E)
- Gurdwara Rampura Kalan Patshahi Chhevin, Rampura Kalan village (31°35'40.6"N 74°29'04.6"E)
- Gurdwara Budhu da Awaa, campus of UET, Lahore on GT Road (31°34'35.9"N 74°21'07.0"E)
- Janamasthan Bhai Daya Singh, in Koocha Softi, now known as Katri Bawa (31°35'13.0"N, 74°19'10.5"E)
- Gurdwara Manhala Baba Balu Hasna, in Manhala village (31°31'36.6"N 74°32'34.6"E)
- Gurdwara Shaheed Bhai Taru Singh, (Note: Not to be confused with the similarly named Gurdwara Shaheedganj Bhai Taru Singh located near Gurdwara Shaheedganj Singh Singhnian.) near Hanuman Gali in Gumti Bazaar in the walled city of Lahore (31°34'55.1"N, 74°18'54.5"E)
- Gurdwara Shaheedganj Bhai Dharam Singh, backside of Cathedral Church of the Resurrection complex on Mall Road (31°33'56.8"N 74°19'04.5"E)
- Samadhis of Maharaja Sher Singh and Tikka Partap Singh, in Sher Singh's Baradari/garden of Shah Bilawal (31°35'39.5"N 74°21'19.1"E)
- Samadhis of Maharani Datar Kaur, Maharani Sahib Kaur, and Maharani Chand Kaur, near the Tomb of Anarkali, now within the campus of Government Islamia College, Civil Lines (31°34'21.7"N 74°18'09.6"E)
- Gurdwara Jamait Singh, Kahna village (31°22'12.5"N, 74°21'59.7"E)
- Gurdwara Chubacha Sahib, in Dharampura (31°33'22.4"N, 74°22'00.1"E)
- Samadhi of Baba Sri Chand or Dera Tahli Sahib, southeast of Lahore Railway Station, on the opposite side of the tracks (31°34'34.3"N 74°20'27.1"E)
- Samadhi of Baba Prithi Chand, in Heir village (31°24'50.3"N 74°29'19.3"E)
- Sarovar of Baba Prithi Chand, in Heir village (31°24'46.9"N 74°29'23.3"E)
- Dera Manak Bhai Pirthi (31°18'08.7"N 74°11'50.6"E)
- Janamasthan Mata Jeeto Ji, Sehgal Gali, Lahore
- Samadhi of Shaheed Bhai Hakikat Singh Dharmi, near Khui Miran village
- Gurudwara Chaumala
- Gurdwara Lal Khoohi
- Gurudwara Janamsathan Bebe Nanki
- Gurudwara 6th Patsha Padhana
- Gurudwara Lahura Sahib
- Gurudwara Sandhawalia

== See also ==
- Katasraj Temple
- Lava temple, Lahore fort
- Evacuee Trust Property Board
- Pakistan Hindu Council
- Shri Krishna Mandir, Rawalpindi
- List of Hindu temples in Pakistan
