= List of places in Lahore =

Lahore remains a major tourist destination in Pakistan. The Walled City of Lahore was renovated in 2014. It is popular due to the presence of two recognized UNESCO World Heritage Sites.

Among the most popular sights are the Lahore Fort, adjacent to the Walled City, and home to the Sheesh Mahal, the Alamgiri Gate, the Naulakha Pavilion, and the Moti Masjid. The fort along with the Shalimar Gardens has been a UNESCO World Heritage Site since 1981.

The city is home to several ancient religious sites including prominent Hindu temples, the Krishna Temple and Valmiki Mandir. The Samadhi of Ranjit Singh, also located near the Walled City, houses the funerary urns of the Sikh ruler Maharaja Ranjit Singh. The most prominent religious building is the Badshahi Mosque, constructed in 1673; it was the largest mosque in the world upon construction. Another popular sight is the Wazir Khan Mosque, known for its extensive faience tile work and constructed in 1635.

Old city of Lahore is known for the grandeur of its Mughal architecture and is unique in ancient wooden balconies, temples, gurdwaras, havelis, narrow winding streets and busy bazaars.

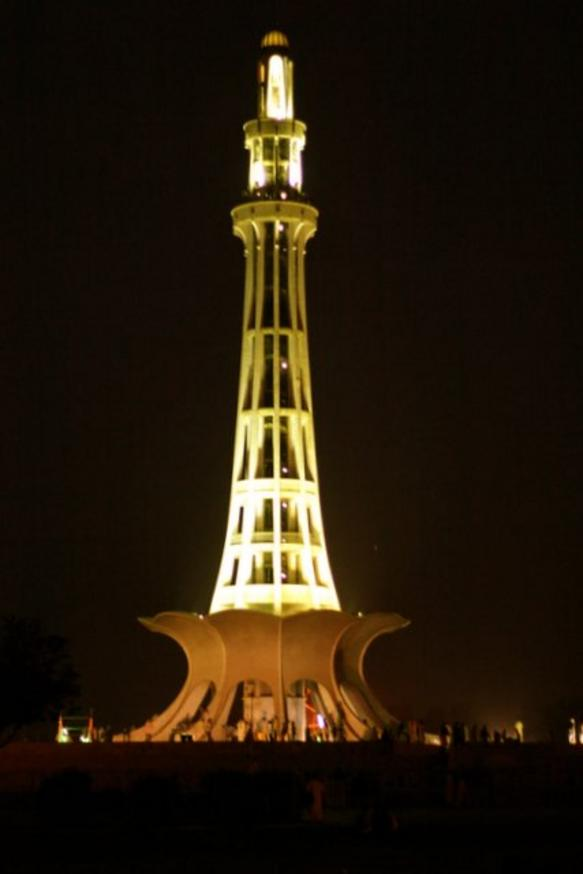
Minar-e-Pakistan

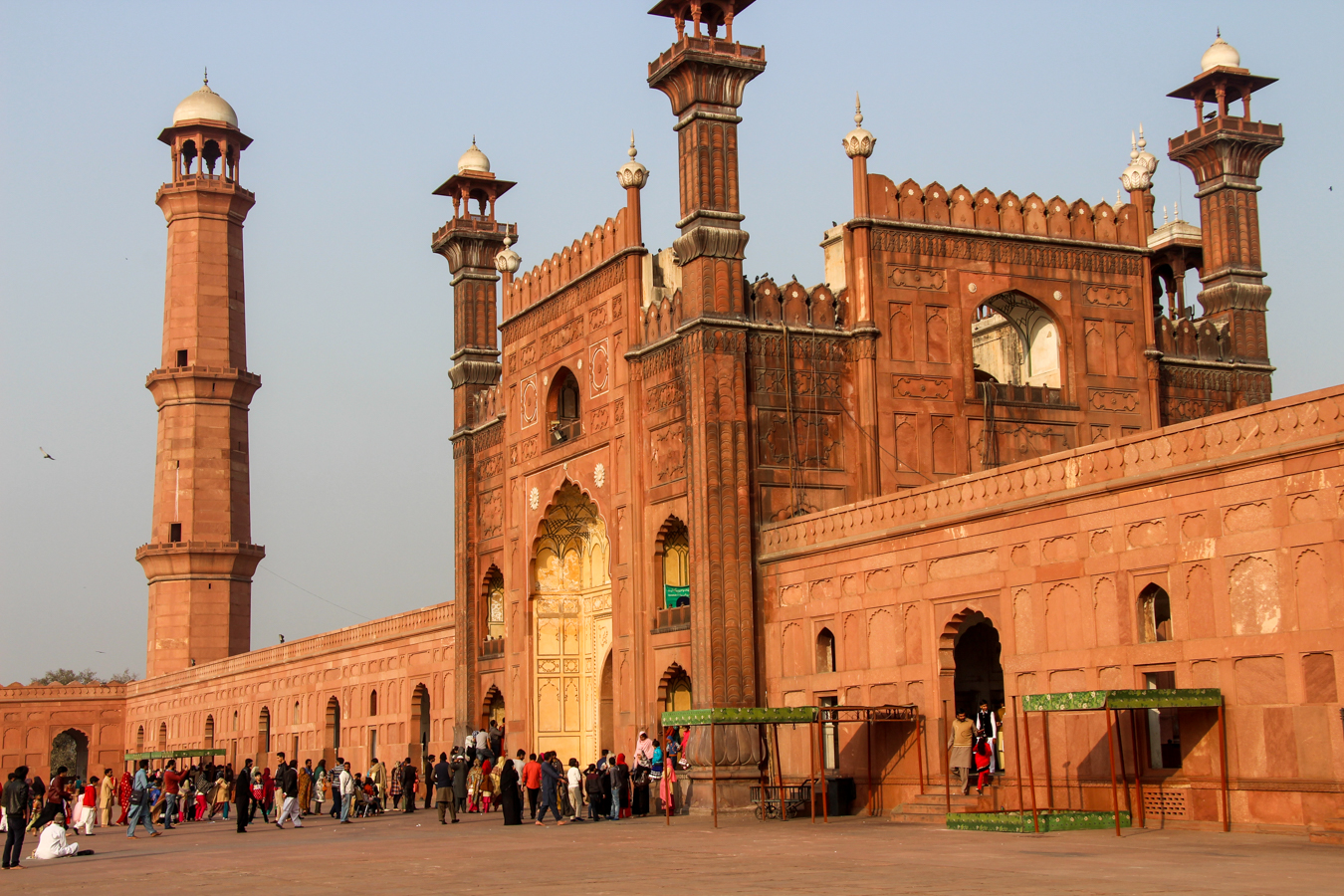
Badshahi Mosque

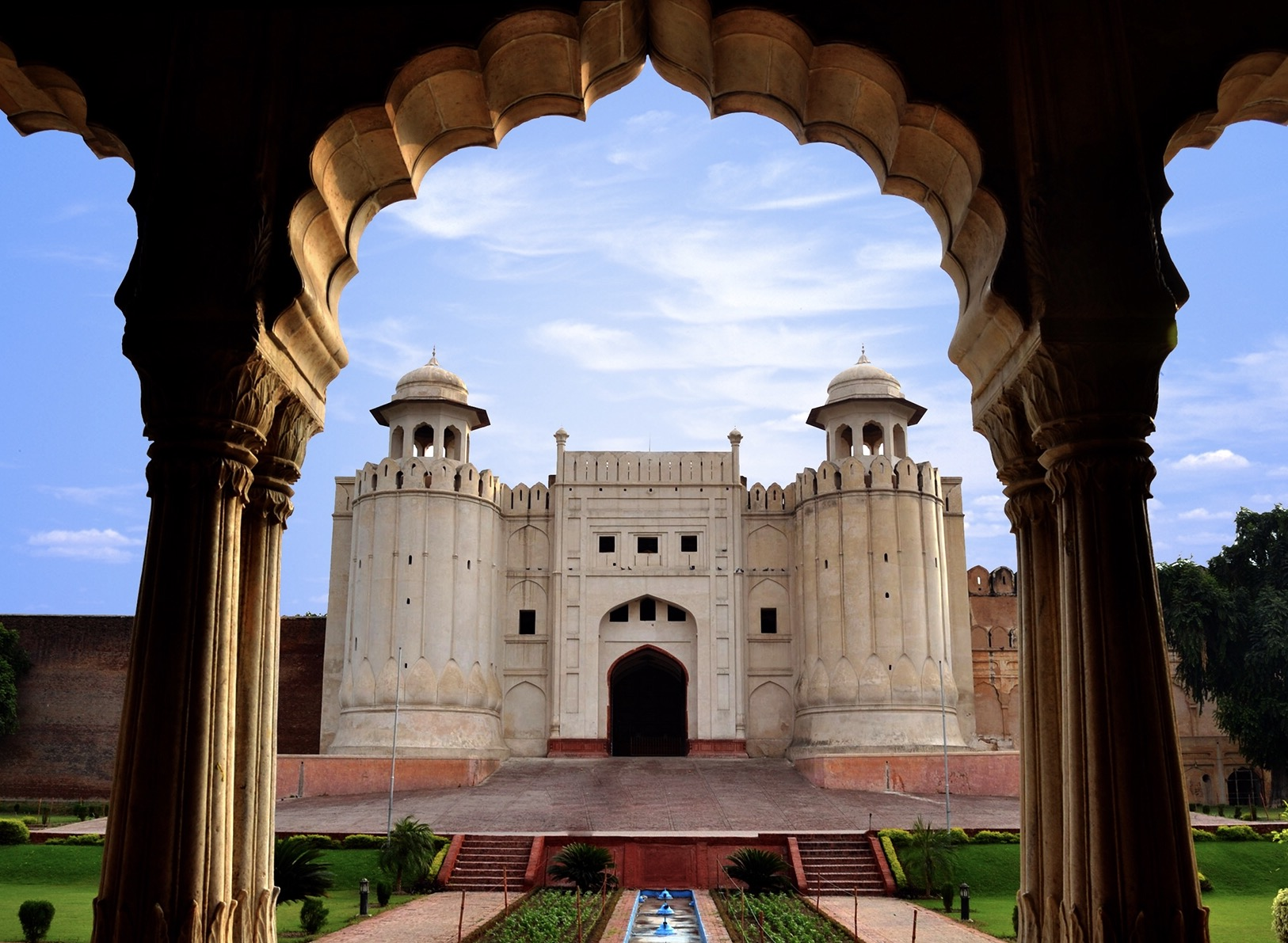
Lahore Fort

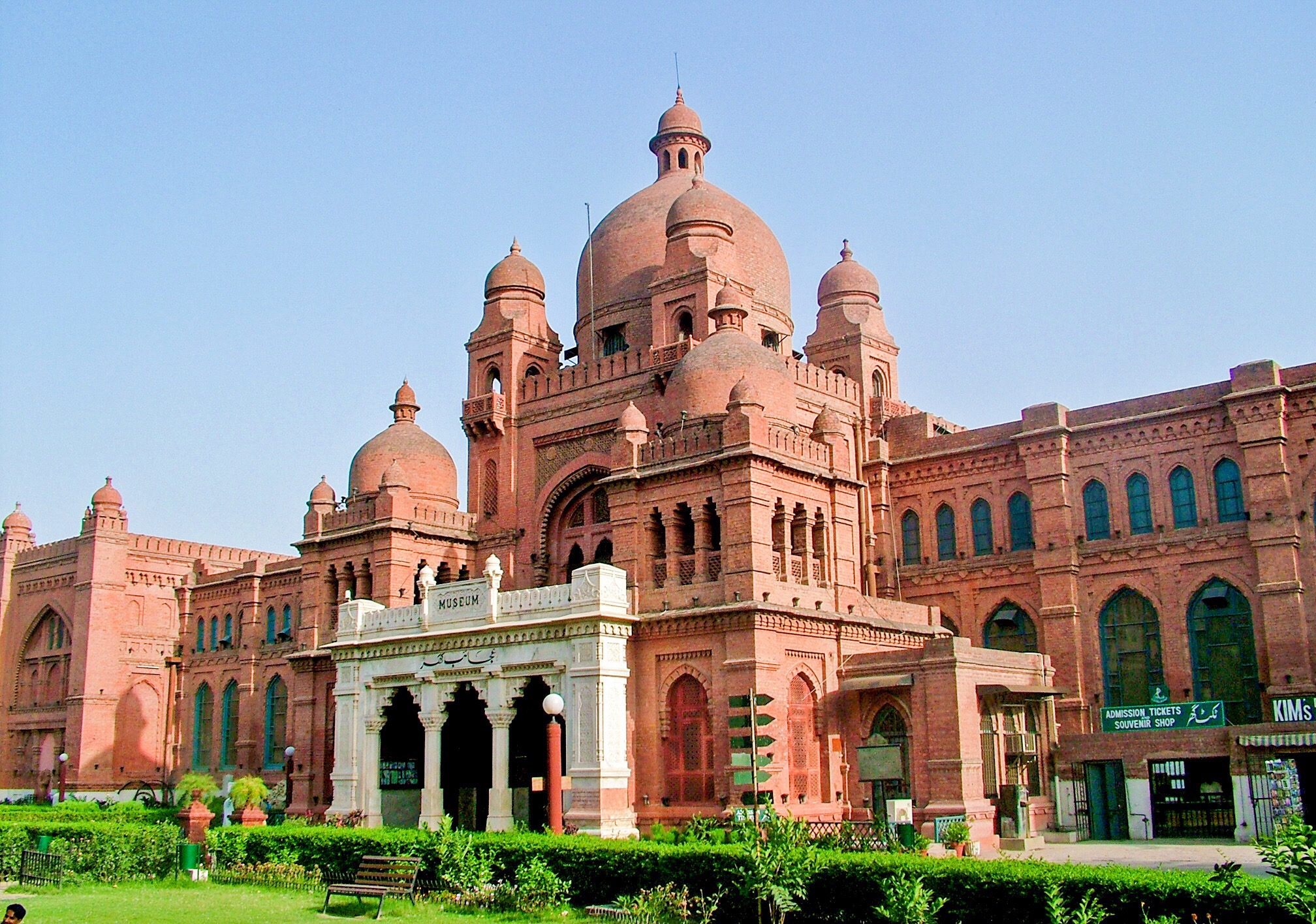
Lahore Museum

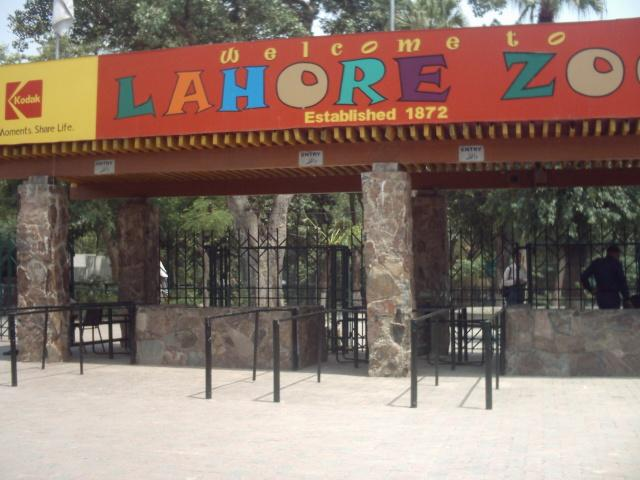
Lahore Zoo

== Burials ==
=== Mausolea and shrines ===
Buildings speak for themselves because architecture is a visual art:

- Tomb of Data Ali Hajvri
- Tomb of Hazrat Mian Mir
- Tomb of Ghazi Ilm-ud-din Shaheed
- Tomb Of Ganj e Inayat Sarkar
- Tomb of Madho Lal Hussain
- Bibi Pak Daman
- Tomb of Asif Khan
- Tomb of Jahangir
- Tomb of Muhammad Iqbal
- Tomb of Nur Jahan
- Tomb of Qutubuddin Aibak
- Tomb of Malik Ayaz
- Ahmed Ali Lahori
- Samadhi of Ranjit Singh

=== Cemeteries ===
- Gora Qabristan
- Miani Sahib Graveyard

== Religious Places ==
=== Mosques ===
- Badshahi Mosque
- Wazir Khan Mosque
- Neevin Mosque
- Darbar Ganj e Inayat Sarkar
- Suneri Mosque
- Moti Mosque
- Grand Jamia Mosque

=== Temples ===
- Krishna Temple
- Lava Temple

=== Churches ===
- St. Anthony's Church, The Mall
- St. Joseph's Church
- St. Mary's Church
- Cathedral Church of Resurrection
- St. Andrew's Church
- St. Anthony's Church, The Mall
- St. Joseph's Church
- St. Mary's Church

=== Gurdwaras ===
- Gurdwara Dera Sahib

== Galleries and museums ==
- Fakir Khana Art Gallery
- Lahore Museum
- Lahore Art Council (also called Alhamra Arts Council)

== Havelis ==
There are many havelis inside the Walled City of Lahore, some in good condition while others need urgent attention. Many of these havelis are fine examples of Mughal and Sikh Architecture. Some of the havelis inside the Walled City include:

- Mubarak Begum Haveli, Bhati Gate, Lahore
- Chuna Mandi Havelis
- Haveli of Nau Nihal Singh
- Nisar Haveli
- Haveli Barood Khana
- Salman Sirhindi ki Haveli
- Dina Nath Ki Haveli
- Mubarak Haveli – Chowk Nawab Sahib, Mochi Gate/Akbari Gate
- Lal Haveli beside Mochi Bagh
- Mughal Haveli (residence of Maharaja Ranjeet Singh)
- Haveli Sir Wajid Ali Shah (near Nisar Haveli)
- Haveli Mian Khan (Rang Mahal)
- Haveli Shergharian (near Lal Khou)

== Hospitals ==
- Jinnah Hospital
- Mayo Hospital
- Shaikh Zayed Hospital
- Shaukat Khanum Memorial Hospital
- Sir Ganga Ram Hospital
- Lady Willingdon Hospital

== Libraries ==
- Model Town Library
- Dyal Singh Trust Library
- The Ewing Memorial Library
- Punjab Public Library
- Quaid-e-Azam Library

== Markets ==
- Liberty Market
- Ali Da Malang (Lahore) or Naveed Nagar
- Fortress Stadium (Lahore)
- Abid Market
- Moon Market, Lahore
- Kareem Market
- Barkat Market, Garden Town, Lahore
- Anarkali bazaar

== Bazars ==
Old Lahore is a hub of commercial activity:

- Anarkali Bazaar
- Gawalmandi
- M. M. Alam road
- Pak Tea House
- The Mall
- Ramghar Bazar
- Shalimar Bazar
- Baghbanpura Bazar
- Dharampura Bazar Lahore
- Sadar Bazar, Lahore
- Ichhra Bazar
- Main Bazar Chungi Ammar Sidhu
- Qanchi Bazar Qanchi

== Trade centers ==
- Ali Trade Center
- Mall Of Defence
- Hafeez Trade Center
- Lahore Stock Exchange
- Siddique Trade Center
- Hall Road
- Vogue Towers
- Haji Plaza

== Monuments ==
- Aiwan-e-Iqbal
- Akbari Sarai
- Bab-e-Pakistan
- Bibi Pak Daman
- Chauburji
- Data Durbar Complex
- Lahore Fort
- Minar-e-Pakistan
- Samadhi of Ranjit Singh
- Sheesh Mahal
- Aiwan-e-Quaid-e-Azam at Nazaria-i-Pakistan Trust

== Parks and gardens ==
- Shalamar Gardens (Shalimar Bagh) – 17th-century Mughal garden complex and UNESCO World Heritage Site
- Bagh-e-Jinnah (formerly Lawrence Gardens) – historical botanical garden on The Mall
- Hazuri Bagh – Mughal- and Sikh-era garden bounded by the Lahore Fort and Badshahi Mosque
- Greater Iqbal Park (formerly Minto Park) – urban park housing the Minar-e-Pakistan
- Jilani Park (Racecourse Park)
- Jallo Park
- Lahore Organic Village – agri-tourism, organic market, and cultural village space on DHA Main Boulevard

== See also ==
- List of places in Faisalabad
- List of places in Multan
