= Religion in Lahore =

Religious makeup of Lahore, Pakistan

It is estimated that the city of Lahore, Pakistan, has a Muslim majority with 94.7% and a Christian minority constitutes 5.1% of the population whilst Sikhs and Hindus constitute the remaining 0.2%. There is also a small but longstanding Zoroastrian community.

Religion in Lahore City 2017
| Religion | Percent |
| Islam | 94.7% |
| Christianity | 5.14% |
| Hinduism | 0.02% |
| Sikhism | 0.02% |
| Others | 0.1% |

== Before Partition ==
Religion in Lahore District (1941)
| Religion | Percent |
| Islam | 60.62% |
| Sikhism | 18.32% |
| Hinduism | 16.79% |
| Christianity | 4.14% |
| Others | 0.14% |

Prior to the partition of India in 1947, a third of Lahore district's population was Hindu and Sikh. Hindus and Sikhs used to reside in 'distinct enclaves'. The city's Hindu and Sikh population left en masse during the partition and shifted to East Punjab and Delhi in India. In the process, Lahore lost its entire Hindu and Sikh population. The emigrants were replaced by Muslim refugees from India. Muslim refugees and locals competed for ownership over abandoned Hindu and Sikh property.

=== Lahore District ===
Religious groups in Lahore District (British Punjab province era)
| Religious group | 1901 | | 1911 | | 1921 | | 1931 | | 1941 | |
| Religious group | Pop. | % | Pop. | % | Pop. | % | Pop. | % | Pop. | % |
|---|---|---|---|---|---|---|---|---|---|---|
| Islam | 717,519 | 61.74% | 626,271 | 60.44% | 647,640 | 57.25% | 815,820 | 59.18% | 1,027,772 | 60.62% |
| Hinduism (Note: 1931-1941: Including Ad-Dharmis) | 276,375 | 23.78% | 217,609 | 21% | 255,690 | 22.6% | 259,725 | 18.84% | 284,689 | 16.79% |
| Sikhism | 159,701 | 13.74% | 169,008 | 16.31% | 179,975 | 15.91% | 244,304 | 17.72% | 310,646 | 18.32% |
| Christianity | 7,296 | 0.63% | 21,781 | 2.1% | 46,454 | 4.11% | 57,097 | 4.14% | 70,147 | 4.14% |
| Jainism | 1,047 | 0.09% | 1,139 | 0.11% | 1,209 | 0.11% | 1,450 | 0.11% | 1,951 | 0.12% |
| Zoroastrianism | 171 | 0.01% | 209 | 0.02% | 179 | 0.02% | 159 | 0.01% | 136 | 0.01% |
| Buddhism | 0 | 0% | 128 | 0.01% | 170 | 0.02% | 14 | 0% | 32 | 0% |
| Judaism | 0 | 0% | 13 | 0% | 13 | 0% | 1 | 0% | 2 | 0% |
| Others | 0 | 0% | 0 | 0% | 6 | 0% | 0 | 0% | 0 | 0% |
| Total population | 1,162,109 | 100% | 1,036,158 | 100% | 1,131,336 | 100% | 1,378,570 | 100% | 1,695,375 | 100% |
Note: British Punjab province era district borders are not an exact match in the present-day due to various bifurcations to district borders — which since created new districts — throughout the historic Punjab Province region during the post-independence era that have taken into account population increases.

Religion in the Tehsils of Lahore District (1921)
| Tehsil | Islam | | Hinduism | | Sikhism | | Christianity | | Jainism | | Others (Note: Including Buddhism, Zoroastrianism, Judaism, Tribals, others, or not stated) | | Total | |
| Tehsil | Pop. | % | Pop. | % | Pop. | % | Pop. | % | Pop. | % | Pop. | % | Pop. | % |
|---|---|---|---|---|---|---|---|---|---|---|---|---|---|---|
| Lahore Tehsil | 290,325 | 56.31% | 139,215 | 27% | 57,337 | 11.12% | 27,898 | 5.41% | 478 | 0.09% | 360 | 0.07% | 515,613 | 100% |
| Chunian Tehsil | 179,399 | 60.71% | 61,475 | 20.8% | 49,151 | 16.63% | 5,408 | 1.83% | 76 | 0.03% | 0 | 0% | 295,509 | 100% |
| Kasur Tehsil | 177,916 | 55.56% | 55,000 | 17.18% | 73,487 | 22.95% | 13,154 | 4.11% | 655 | 0.2% | 2 | 0% | 320,214 | 100% |
Note: British Punjab province era tehsil borders are not an exact match in the present-day due to various bifurcations to tehsil borders — which since created new tehsils — throughout the historic Punjab Province region during the post-independence era that have taken into account population increases.

Religion in the Tehsils of Lahore District (1941)
| Tehsil | Hinduism | | Islam | | Sikhism | | Christianity | | Jainism | | Others (Note: Including Anglo-Indian Christians, British Christians, Buddhism, Zoroastrianism, Judaism, Tribals, others, or not stated) | | Total | |
| Tehsil | Pop. | % | Pop. | % | Pop. | % | Pop. | % | Pop. | % | Pop. | % | Pop. | % |
|---|---|---|---|---|---|---|---|---|---|---|---|---|---|---|
| Lahore Tehsil | 193,714 | 21.77% | 552,907 | 62.12% | 103,312 | 11.61% | 37,442 | 4.21% | 1,095 | 0.12% | 2,458 | 0.28% | 890,024 | 100% |
| Chunian Tehsil | 56,293 | 14.4% | 237,829 | 60.85% | 83,888 | 21.46% | 11,730 | 3% | 47 | 0.01% | 165 | 0.04% | 390,852 | 100% |
| Kasur Tehsil | 34,682 | 8.37% | 237,036 | 57.19% | 123,446 | 29.78% | 18,514 | 4.47% | 809 | 0.2% | 8 | 0% | 414,499 | 100% |
Note1: British Punjab province era tehsil borders are not an exact match in the present-day due to various bifurcations to tehsil borders — which since created new tehsils — throughout the historic Punjab Province region during the post-independence era that have taken into account population increases. Note2: Tehsil religious breakdown figures for Christianity only includes local Christians, labeled as "Indian Christians" on census. Does not include Anglo-Indian Christians or British Christians, who were classified under "Other" category.

=== Lahore City ===
Religion in Lahore City (1941)
| Religion | Percent |
| Islam | 64.49% |
| Hinduism | 26.71% |
| Sikhism | 5.07% |
| Christianity | 3.20% |

Religious groups in Lahore City (1881−1941)
| Religious group | 1881 | | 1891 | | 1901 | | 1911 | | 1921 | | 1931 | | 1941 | |
| Religious group | Pop. | % | Pop. | % | Pop. | % | Pop. | % | Pop. | % | Pop. | % | Pop. | % |
|---|---|---|---|---|---|---|---|---|---|---|---|---|---|---|
| Islam | 86,413 | 57.85% | 102,280 | 57.83% | 119,601 | 58.93% | 129,801 | 56.76% | 149,044 | 52.89% | 249,315 | 58.01% | 433,170 | 64.49% |
| Hinduism | 53,641 | 35.91% | 62,077 | 35.1% | 70,196 | 34.59% | 77,267 | 33.79% | 107,783 | 38.25% | 139,125 | 32.37% | 179,422 | 26.71% |
| Sikhism | 4,627 | 3.1% | 7,306 | 4.13% | 7,023 | 3.46% | 12,877 | 5.63% | 12,833 | 4.55% | 23,477 | 5.46% | 34,021 | 5.07% |
| Christianity | 529 (Note: Only includes protestant population.) | 0.35% | 4,697 | 2.66% | 5,558 | 2.74% | 8,436 | 3.69% | 11,287 | 4.01% | 16,875 | 3.93% | 21,495 | 3.2% |
| Jainism | 227 | 0.15% | 339 | 0.19% | 420 | 0.21% | 467 | 0.2% | 474 | 0.17% | 791 | 0.18% | 1,094 | 0.16% |
| Zoroastrianism | —N/a | —N/a | 132 | 0.07% | 166 | 0.08% | 198 | 0.09% | 177 | 0.06% | 150 | 0.03% | —N/a | —N/a |
| Judaism | —N/a | —N/a | 14 | 0.01% | —N/a | —N/a | 13 | 0.01% | 13 | 0% | 0 | 0% | —N/a | —N/a |
| Buddhism | —N/a | —N/a | 0 | 0% | 0 | 0% | 128 | 0.06% | 170 | 0.06% | 14 | 0% | —N/a | —N/a |
| Others | 3,932 | 2.63% | 9 | 0.01% | 0 | 0% | 0 | 0% | 0 | 0% | 0 | 0% | 2,457 | 0.37% |
| Total population | 149,369 | 100% | 176,854 | 100% | 202,964 | 100% | 228,687 | 100% | 281,781 | 100% | 429,747 | 100% | 671,659 | 100% |
Note: 1881-1941: Data for the entirety of the town of Lahore, which included Lahore Municipality and Lahore Cantonment.

== Religious heritage ==
Hindu legends mention Lahore was once named Lavapura, after Lava, son of Lord Rama, Hindu God from Ramayana as one of etymological theory of Lahore. A vacant temple, the Lava Temple, dedicated to this figure is contained inside the Lahore Fort.

The first Persian text on Sufism was written, by Hazrat Data Ganj Bakhsh Shaykh Abul Hasan 'Ali Hujwiri R.A. in Lahore which became a major source for early Sufi thought and practice. Hazrat e Hujwiri R.A's tomb in Lahore is one of the major Sufi shrines in the subcontinent. Several other leading Sufi saints are buried in Lahore. These Sufi shrines have contributed to making Lahore an important place of pilgrimage. During the Mughal era, several impressive buildings including mosques were constructed, contributing to the city's rich Mughal heritage.

The city is also of importance to Sikhs as some Sikh sites such as the Samadhi of Ranjit Singh are situated inside Lahore.

== Gallery ==
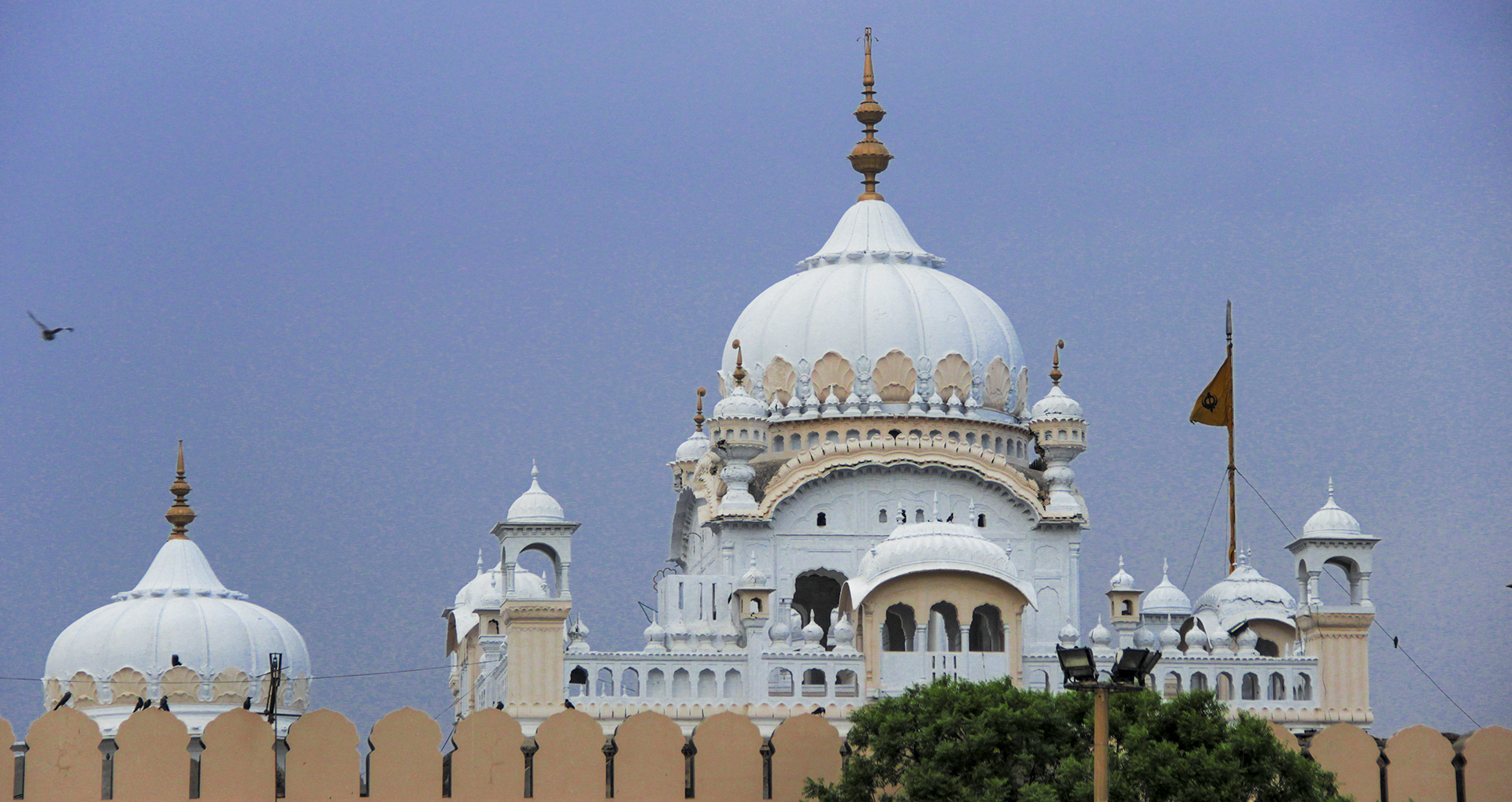
Samadhi of Ranjit Singh

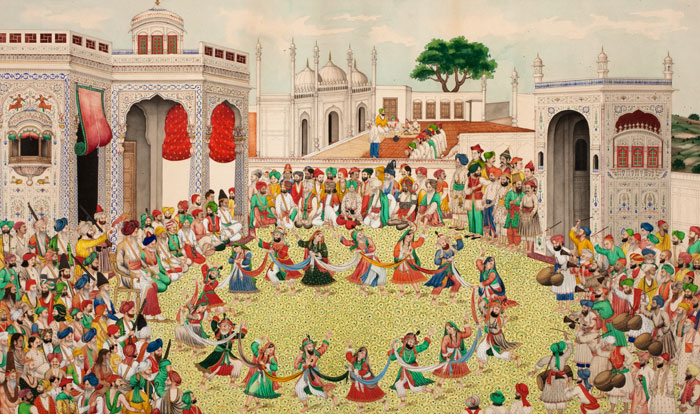
Sher Singh in Lahore

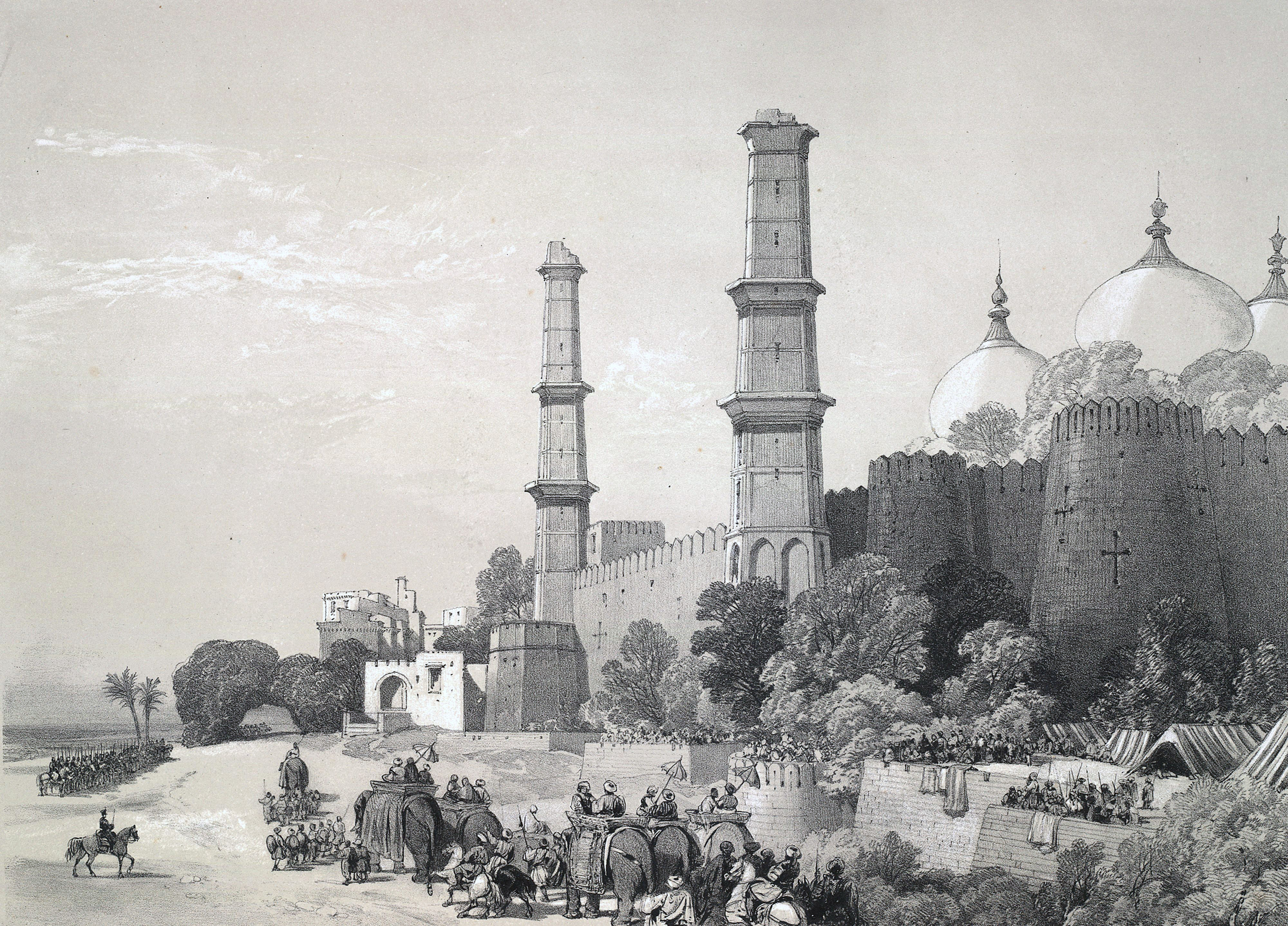
Maharajah Duleep Singh, entering his palace in Lahore.
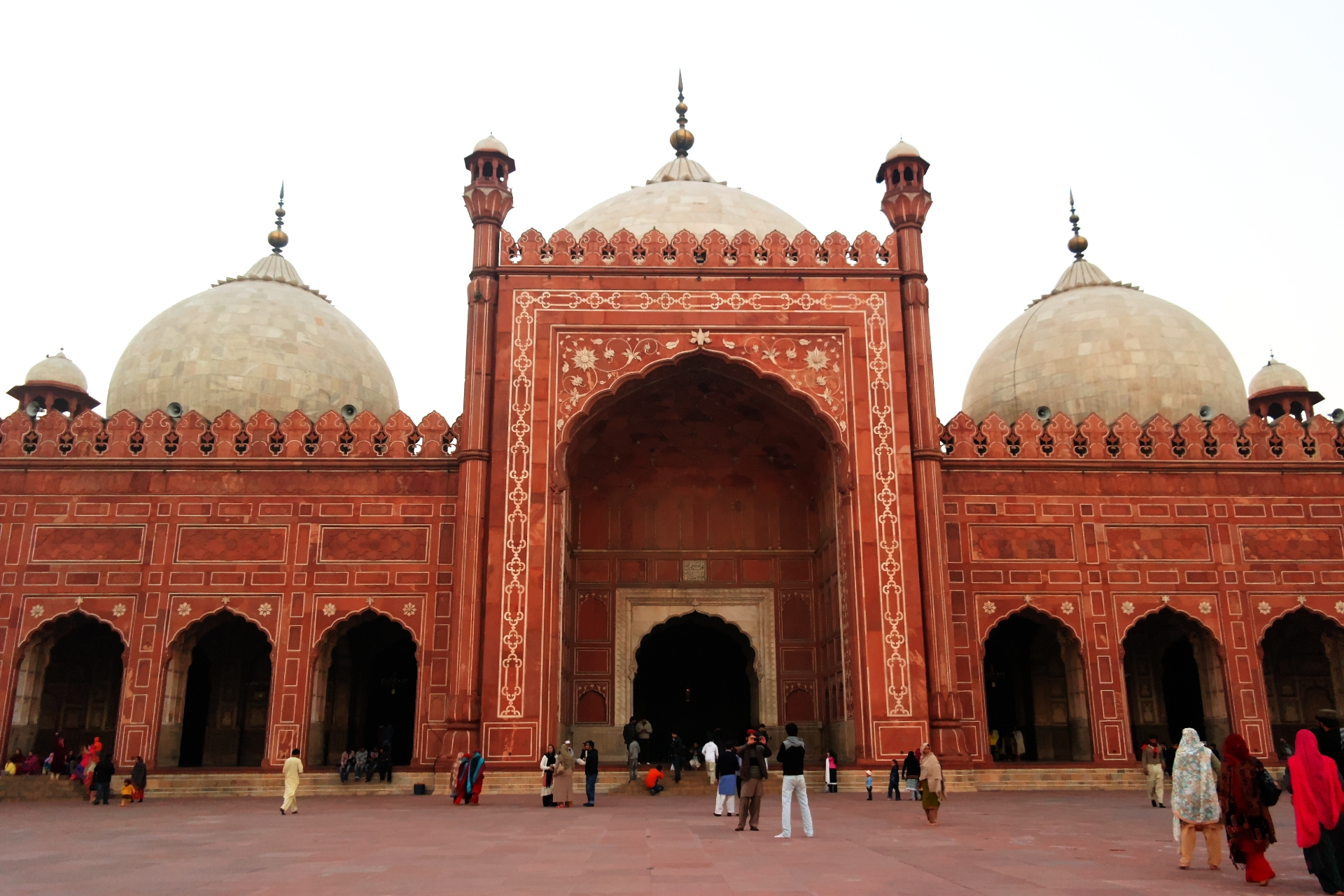
Badshahi Mosque

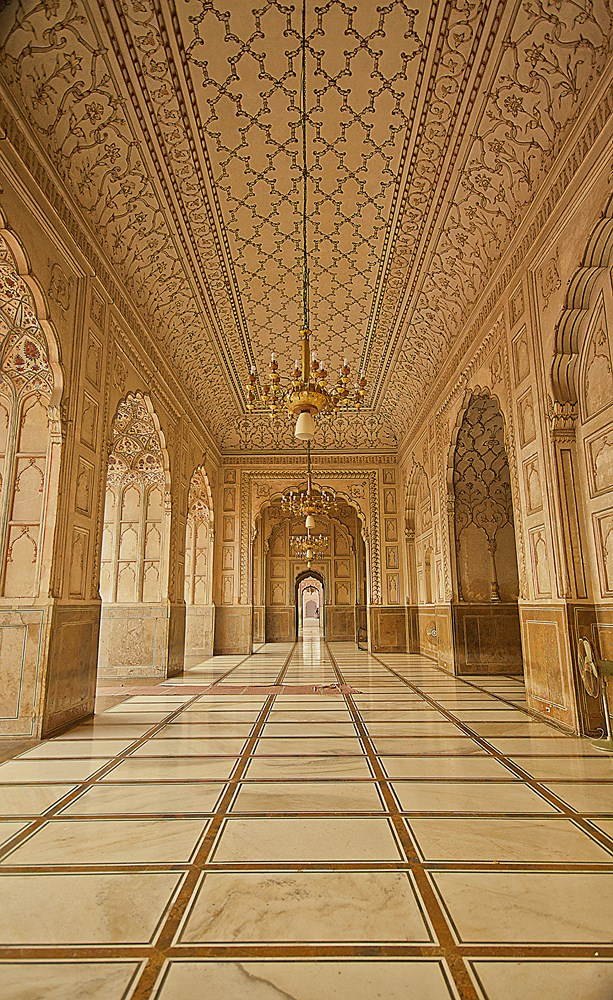
Inside the Badshahi Mosque

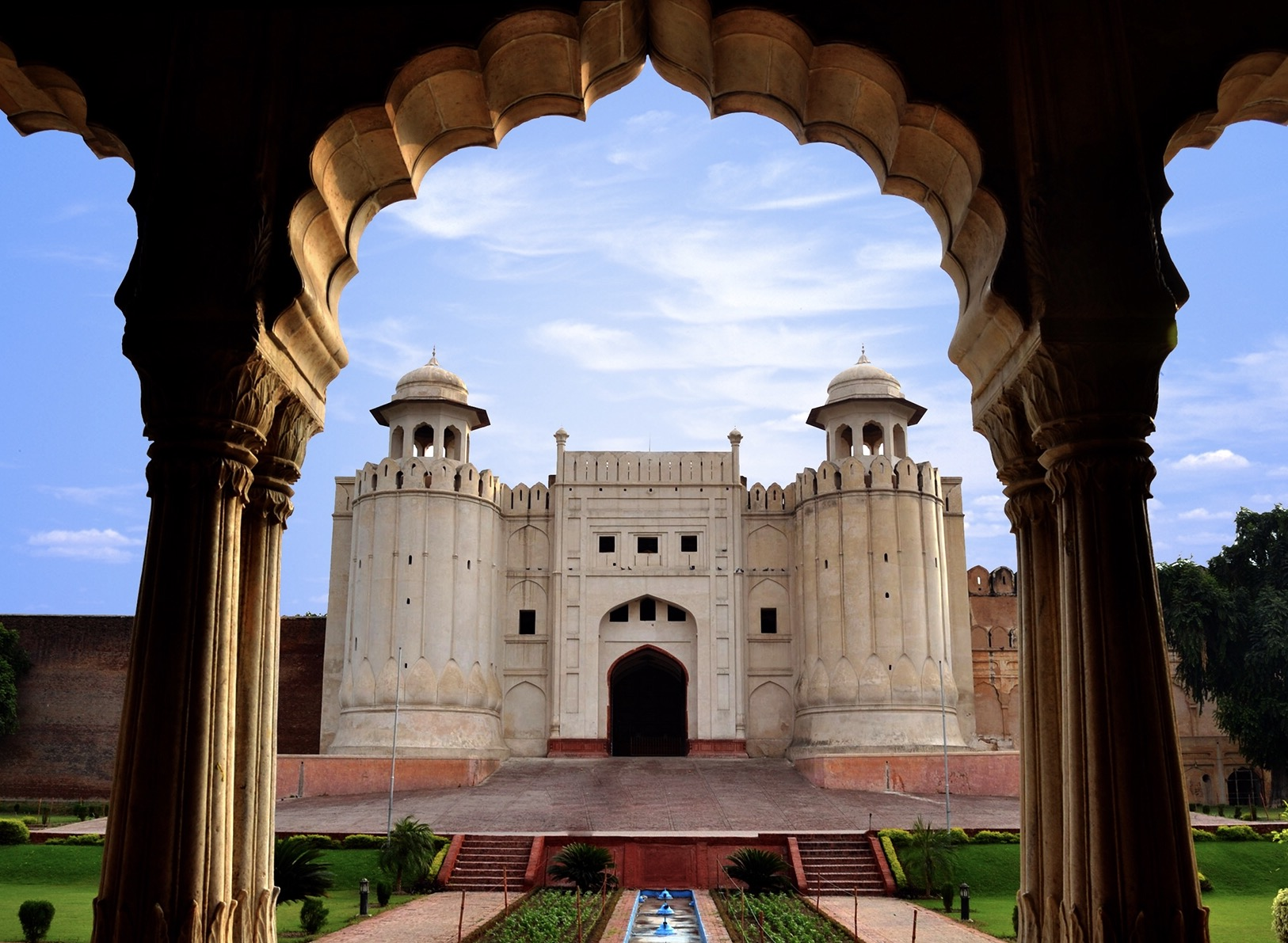
Lahore Fort

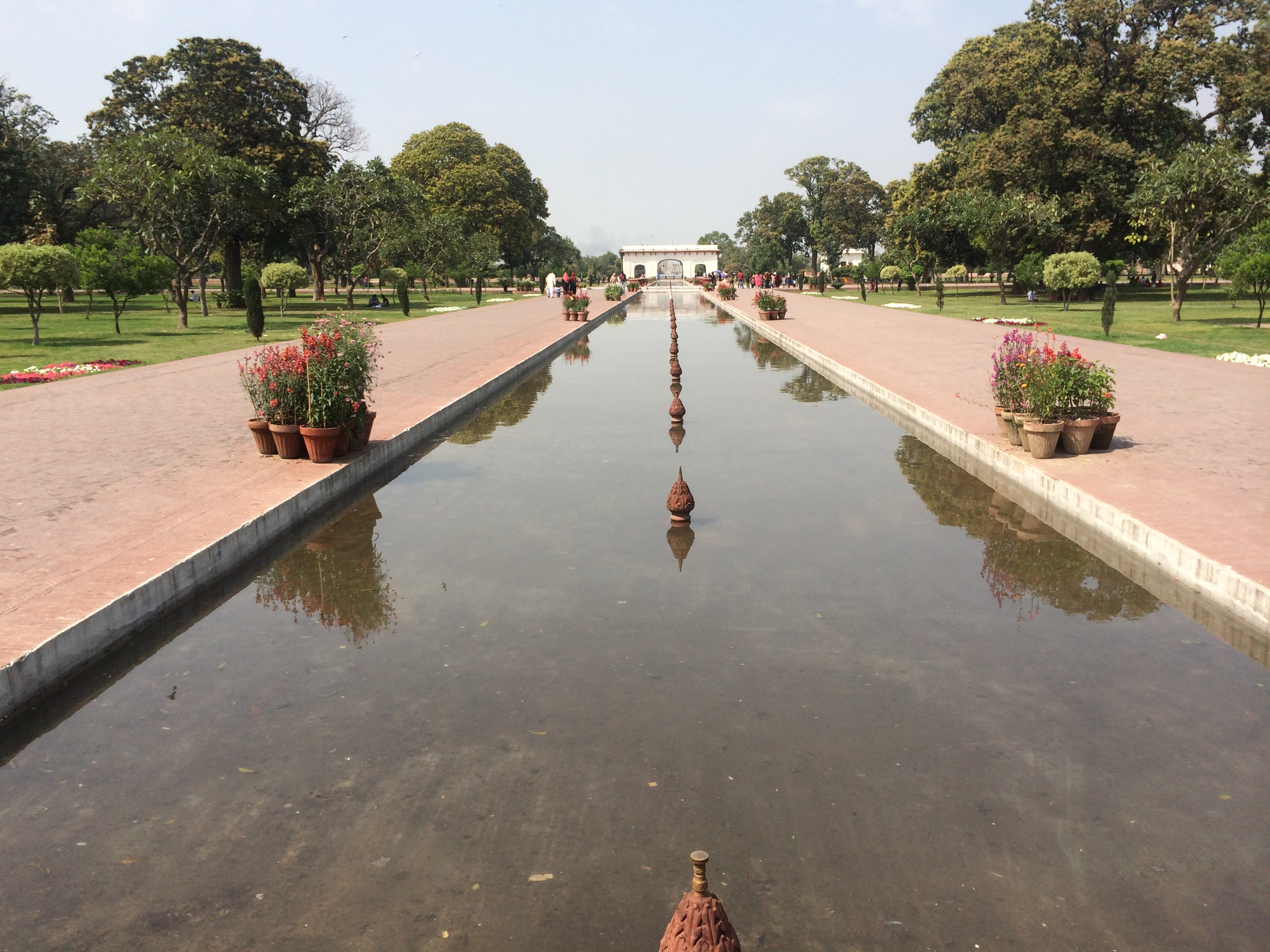
Shalimar Gardens, Lahore
