= Etymology of Lahore =

Origin of the place-name Lahore

The origin of Lahore's name is unclear. The city is first mentioned as Al-Ahwar in Futuh al-Buldan by Al-Baladhuri, written in 894 CE. However, the first document that explicitly mentions the city by name is the Hudud al-'Alam ("The Regions of the World"), written in 982 CE.

== Variant transcriptions ==
Lahore's name had been recorded by early Muslim historians as Al-Ahwar, A'lahwur, Luhawar, Lūhār, and Rahwar. The Iranian Polymath and Geographer, Abu Rayhan Al-Biruni, referred to the city as Luhāwar in his 11th century work, Qanun, while the poet Amir Khusrow, who lived during the Delhi Sultanate, recorded the city's name as Lāhanūr. Yaqut al-Hamawi records the city's name as Lawhūr, mentioning that it's famously known as Lahāwar. Al Idrisi in his 12th century work the Nuzhatulmushtak-fi-Iftikharul Afak, also writes of a city named Lohawar.

== Etymological theories ==
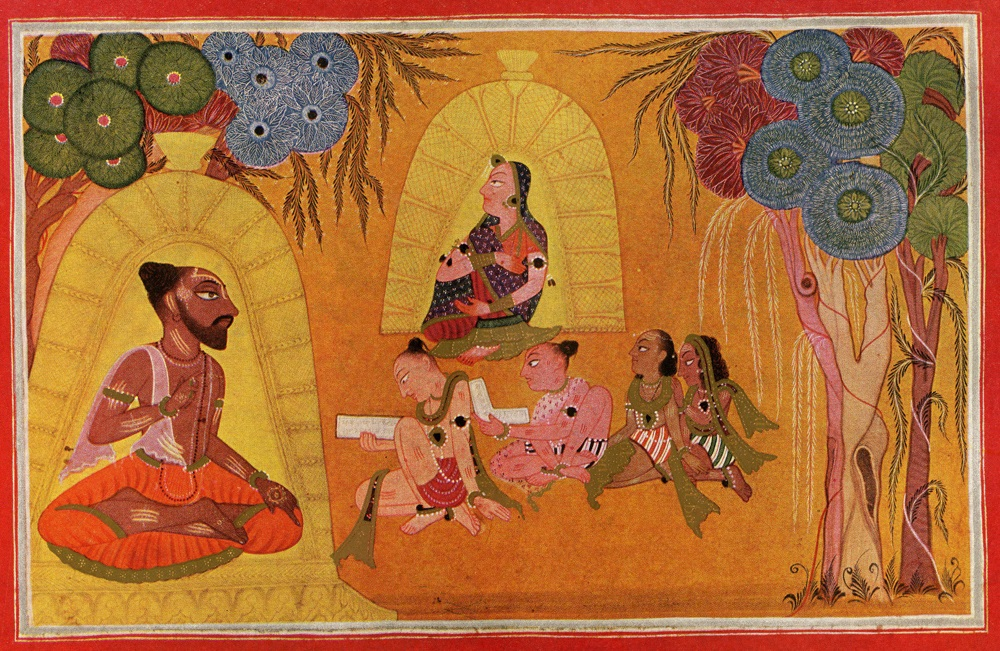
Sita, Lava, and Kusha in the hermitage of Valmiki

One theory suggests that Lahore's name is a corruption of the word Ravāwar, as R to L shifts are common in languages derived from Sanskrit. Ravāwar is the simplified pronunciation of the name Iravatyāwar - a name possibly derived from the Ravi River, known as the Iravati in the Vedas. The suffix"awar" is a corruption of the Sanskrit word "awarna", meaning fort, and is affixed to many place names in the Indian subcontinent, such as Peshawar, Sanawar, Bijawar.

Another theory suggests the city's name may derive from the word Lohar, meaning "blacksmith."

According to Hindu legend, Lahore's name derives from Lavpur or Lavapuri ("City of Lava"), and is said to have been founded by Prince Lava, the son of Sita and Rama. The same account attributes the founding of nearby Kasur, which was actually founded by Afghans in the Mughal period, to his twin brother Kusha. In the Deshwa Bhaga, Lahore is called Lavpor, which at once points to its origin from Lava. An empty Lava temple is located inside the Lahore Fort, but it was built during the Sikh era in the 19th-century. In the later annals of Rajputana the name is given as Lohkot and Lavkot, meaning "the fort of Loh" which also references its mythical founder.
