= Gurdwara Rori Sahib =

Historic Sikh gurdwara

Coordinates: 31°21′21″N 74°32′03″E

Gurdwara Rori Sahib Patshahi Pehli
- Photographed in 2015 prior to its collapse

Religion
- Affiliation: Sikhism
- Festival: Vaisakhi (historical)
- Status: Defunct (abandoned in 1947; collapsed in July 2023)

Location
- Location: Jahman village, Lahore district, Punjab, Pakistan
- Interactive map of Gurdwara Rori Sahib Patshahi Pehli

Architecture
- Style: Sikh architecture
- Creator: Bhai Wadhawa Singh
- Completed: c. 1799–1839

Gurdwara Rori Sahib (official name Gurdwara Rori Sahib Patshahi Pehla) was a historic Sikh gurdwara located half a kilometre east of Jahman village in Lahore District, Punjab, Pakistan. The edifice marked a spot on a mound where Guru Nanak and Bhai Mardana sat and sung songs together. Existing as a temple on a raised mound, the shrine was located only a few kilometres from the India-Pakistan border, with houses from the Indian side of the border being viewable from the roof of the shrine.

The gurdwara was located on a historical route that connected several historical Sikh shrines together based out of villages in the general vicinity, such as Jahman, Bedian, Heir, and Chahal villages. Bedian was founded by Nanak's descendants, Heir was associated with the Mina sect, and Chahal was the ancestral village of Nanak's maternal family. The gurdwara is in poor condition and dangerous to explore due to its unstable nature. The gurdwara is located at the coordinates 31°21'20.6"N 74°32'02.5"E.

== Etymology ==
The word rori (meaning "shards" in Punjabi) is derived from the potsherds excavated at the mound the shrine was built-on. Thus, the site acquired the name Rori Sahib.

== History ==
=== Religious significance ===
The village of Jahman, located 1.5 km from the international border, was purportedly founded in the 13th century as per British land survey reports. Jhaman village was a stopping place for Guru Nanak, who journeyed to his ancestral maternal village of Chahal (located near Jahman) to visit his maternal grandparents, travelling with his companion Bhai Mardana. (Note: The name of Jahman village is alternatively spelt as 'Jhaman'.) The site the gurdwara was built on is said to have been a spot near the bank of a big pond that Nanak and Mardana are believed to taken rest at and sung spiritual hymns whilst seated atop of the mound.

It is believed Guru Nanak visited the site three times during his life. During one such visit prior to his divine revelation, Guru Nanak is said to have found some pottery shards from ruins located on the mound. Afterwards, Guru Nanak disembarked from Jahman for Sultanpur Lodhi. On one of these visits, it is believed that Nanak used wood from a tree at Jahman village to use for the construction of a sarangi instrument for Bhai Mardana.

=== Operation as a gurdwara ===
Afterwards, the pond was expanded and converted into a temple tank (sarovar) by a devotee of the area named Naria and the gurdwara was constructed, most likely during the reign of Maharaja Ranjit Singh, at the location to mark its significance. The raising of the darbar-style gurdwara is attributed to Bhai Wadhawa Singh. Festivals were held at the shrine's location on Vaisakhi and the 20th day of the month of Jeth. There exists a land-grant of 100 bigha in the name of the gurdwara.

The gurdwara became affiliated to the Shiromani Gurdwara Parbandhak Committee. During the colonial-period, the Naujawan Bharat Sabha was based in nearby Jahman village. As a result, some martyrs of the Indian independence movement also hailed from the local village. The bhog ceremony of Bhagat Singh, Sukhdev Thapar, and Shivaram Rajguru attracted five-to-seven thousand attendees to the village.

After the partition of Punjab in 1947, the gurdwara was abandoned by Sikhs. Pre-partition, the nearby village of Jahman had a Sikh-majority population, with a Muslim minority belonging to landless artisans and scheduled castes. After 1947, land formerly owned by Sikhs surrounding the gurdwara was illegally-occupied, which amounted to 100 bigha (around 500 kanal).

The Pakistan Rangers took possession of the former gurdwara and used it as a border outpost to survey the boundary with India. Civilians were not allowed to visit the former gurdwara or take photos of it while it was occupied by the Pakistani military. According to Yudhvir Rana of The Times of India, the Khalistani militant Wadhawa Singh Babbar of Babbar Khalsa International was housed in the gurdwara during the Punjab insurgency. Visiting the site in 1994, Iqbal Qaiser later wrote in a book titled Historical Sikh Shrines in Pakistan (1998) that the pond associated with the shrine had shrunk and the dome of the building needed repairs, warning of future collapse if not availed. In 1995, the Pakistan Rangers stopped using the shrine as a border post due to safety concerns as the building started forming cracks and also due to privacy complaints by local villagers. In circa 2008, the shrine was still in a relatively complete state but started decaying fast shortly thereafter. An outhouse was placed outside of the gurdwara by a local landlord. The quick decline of the site after the clearance of the Pakistan Rangers has been attributed to land-grabbers seizing land around the gurdwara.

=== Present condition ===
Prior to its collapse, the gurdwara was in a poor-condition. There existed frescoes depicting the ten Sikh gurus on the underside of the gurdwara's dome. The frescoes depicted the Sikh gurus engaged in warfare and also children of the gurus. However, the faces of the figuratives in the frescoes have been deliberately chipped-off by an iconoclastic vandal. The abandoned gurdwara was believed to be haunted, with an episode of a Pakistani paranormal investigation show being filmed at it.

Its associated temple tank has become dirty. Treasure-hunters dug-up the floor in the room where the Guru Granth Sahib was formerly recited within the temple. The walls of the edifice have been vandalized by Islamic graffiti.

After the successful opening of the Kartarpur Corridor, Haroon Khalid has proposed the feasibility of opening the gurdwara up for visits by Indian Sikh pilgrims via a corridor connecting to the Indian border. Haroon Khalid has identified a total of five Sikh gurdwaras (excluding Gurdwara Kartarpur Sahib) associated with a Sikh guru very near to the Indian border in Pakistan.

==== Collapse ====
In July 2023, much of the gurdwara collapsed due to flooding and decades-long neglect. According to Balwinder Singh of INTACH, the immediate cause of the collapse was water from the flooded pond located adjacent to the site seeping into the foundation of the shrine. After the collapse, only the backwall and a small portion of a sidewall remains whilst the dome, central part of the building, and the whole front of the building totally collapsed. The remaining remnants of wall post-collapse are three to four feet in-height.

The Indian National Trust for Art and Cultural Heritage (INTACH) has requested Sikh and government bodies on both sides of the border to make efforts to preserve whatever remained of the site after its collapse. The Pakistani authorities and Pakistan Sikh Gurdwara Prabandhak Committee have not made any attempts at conserving the shrine till now.

== Architecture ==
The gurdwara was a two-storied structure constructed out of red nanakshahi bricks. A large, golden dome complimented the top of the building. At the front of the site laid a pond.

== Gallery ==
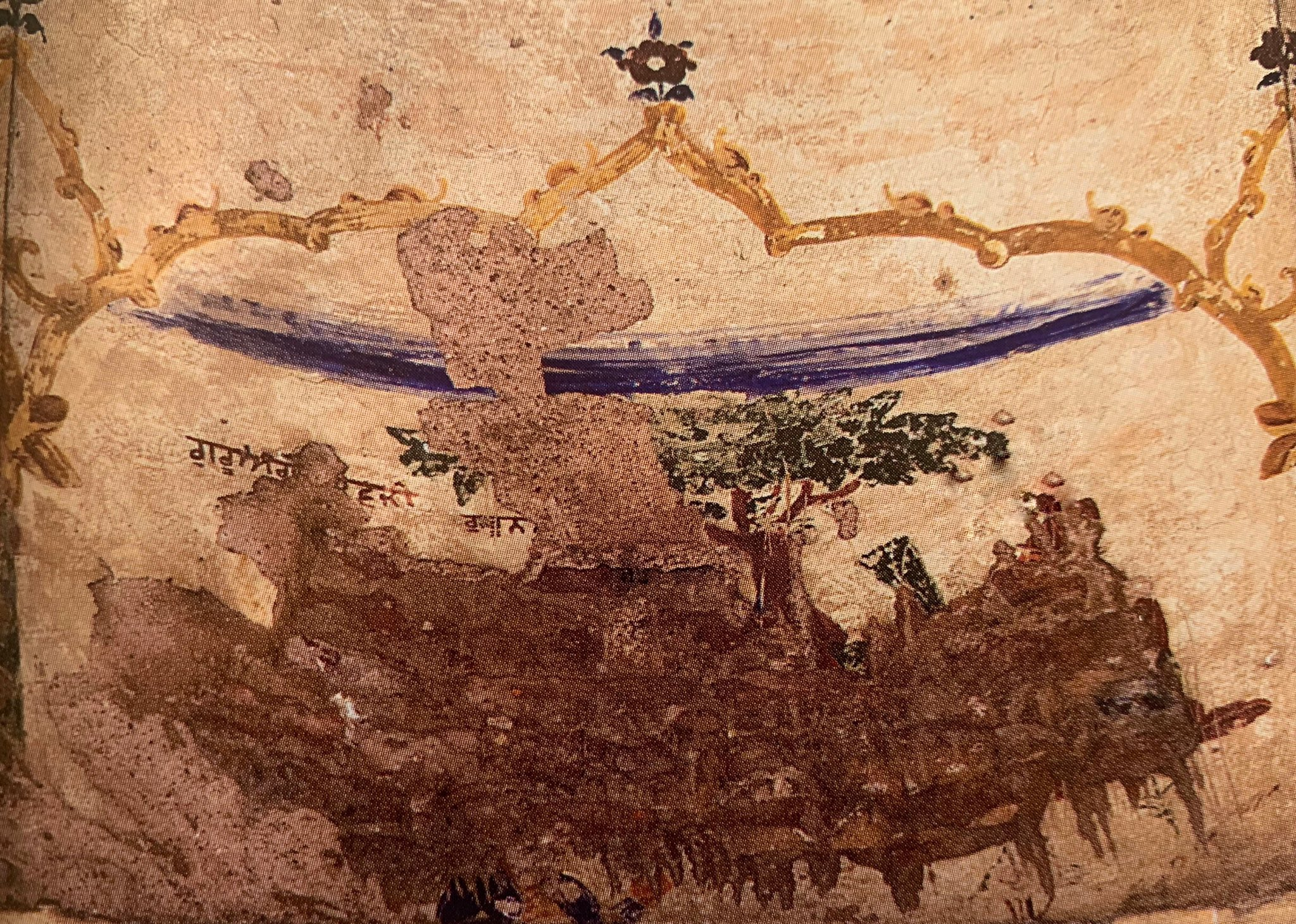
Fresco formerly depicting Guru Nanak with Guru Angad

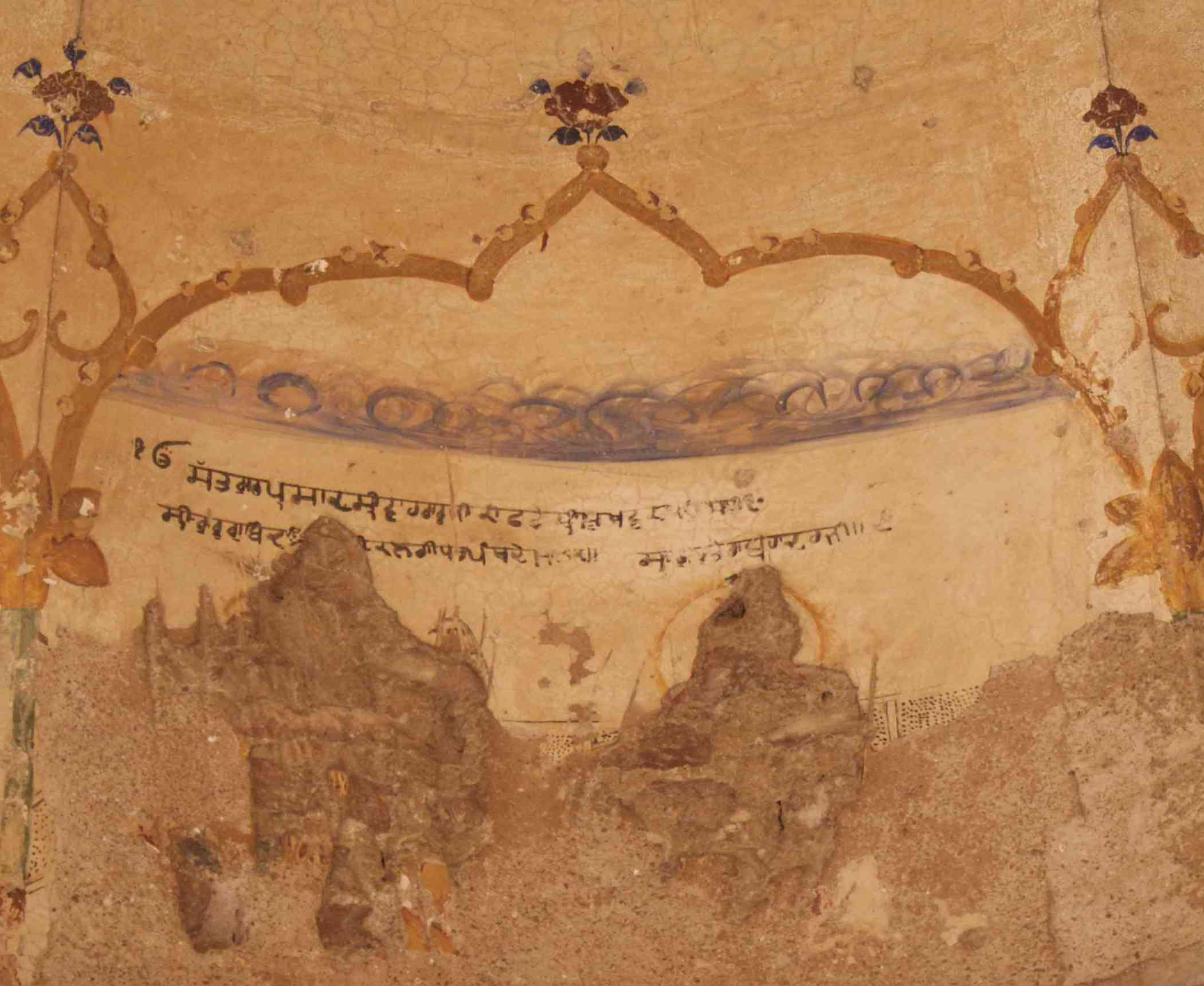
Fresco formerly depicting Guru Gobind Singh
