= Gurdwara Patshahi Chhevin (Hadiara) =

Sikh temple in Hadiara, Pakistan

Religion
- Affiliation: Sikhism
- Status: Defunct

Location
- Location: Hadiara, Lahore district, Punjab, Pakistan

Gurdwara Patshahi Chhevin is a Sikh gurdwara located in Hadiara, Lahore district, Punjab, Pakistan. The gurdwara is dedicated to the sixth Sikh guru, Guru Hargobind, who is believed to have visited the area from Gurdwara Jhallian PatshahiChhevin and stayed overnight here. Before the partition of Punjab in 1947, a huge fair used to be held at the gurdwara every Maghi. During the Sikh Empire, 100 acres of land was associated with the gurdwara. Before 1947, it was managed by the Shiromani Gurdwara Parbandhak Committee. After the partition of India in 1947, the gurdwara became abandoned and was occupied as a residence by westward migrants from India. During the 1965 Indo-Pakistani war, soldiers from the Sikh Regiment of the Indian military captured the site. The Indian soldiers repaired the dome of the gurdwara which had been damaged by shelling and installed a Nishan Sahib flag at the top of the structure. The gurdwara contains many frescoes albeit in poor condition.

== Location ==
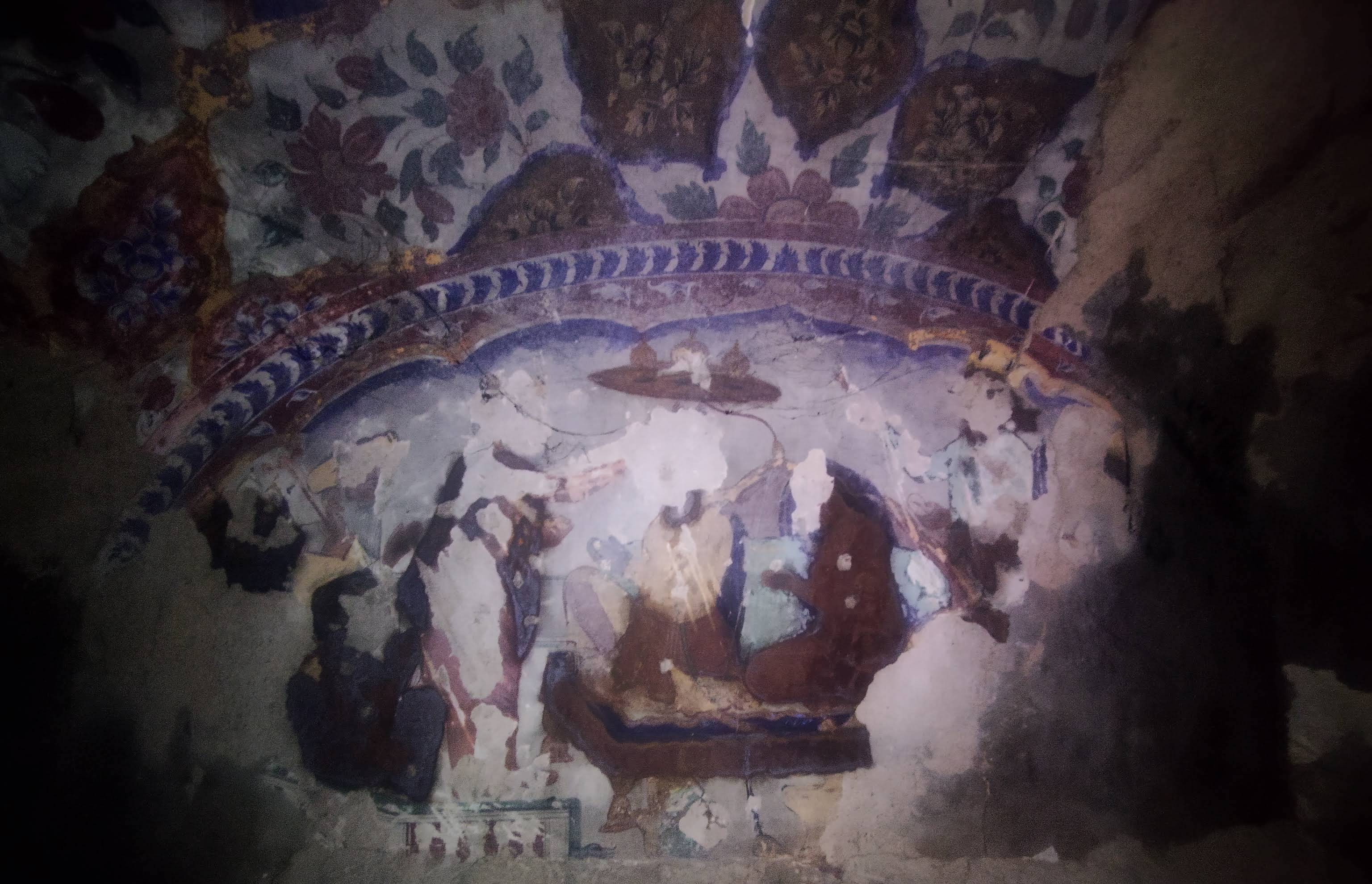
Fresco depicting a courtly scene of figuratives from Gurdwara Patshahi Chhevin, Hadiara

The gurdwara is located less than 4 km away from the Radcliffe Line, marking the international border between India and Pakistan. The gurdwara is visible from Nushehra Dhala village in India. The gurdwara has been documented on Gurudwarapedia via geo-tagging. The gurdwara is located at the coordinates 31°26'40.9"N, 74°33'57.7"E.
