= Shah Alami =

Market in Lahore, Pakistan

Shah Alam Market (or Shahalmi Market or Shah Alami) is one of the largest markets in Lahore, Pakistan.

The "Shah-Almi Gate" is named after Mughal emperor Shah Alam I, son of Aurangzeb. Prior to his death, the gate was called the "Bherwala Gate". During the 1947 partition riots, the gate was burned. Today only the name survives. Shah Alam Market is one of Lahore's biggest commercial markets. More commonly called "Shah Almi Market" or Shahalmi, it is located near the site of the gate. This is used to be one of the 13 doors of the Walled City of Lahore. Its location can be traced at the sidelines of Shah Almi Market, Lahore.

== Bazaars in Shah Alam Market ==
There are more than 25 bazaars in Shah Alam Market. The famous one includes Pappar Mandi, Rang Mahal, Bottle Bazzar, and Sarafa Bazaar.

== Partition ==
Before the partition of India, Shah Alami was mostly a Hindu populated area with businesses owned by Hindus. During the 1947 partition, most of the Hindus were forced to migrate to India.

== Location ==
Shahalmi market is near Mayo Chowk opposite shop, Lahore. Mayo Chowk is next to the Mayo Hospital gate. After arriving at Mayo Chowk a one-way traffic road leads toward the entrance of Shahalmi Market. The place is very populated and has a small road.
