= Krishna Mandir, Lahore =

Hindu temple in Pakistan

- کرشنا مندر، لاہور
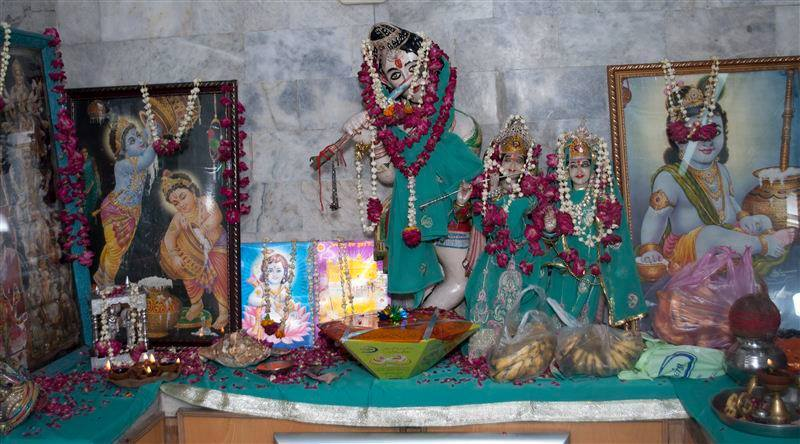
- Interior view of temple.

- Location within Pakistan

Religion
- Affiliation: Hinduism
- District: Lahore
- Deity: Krishna
- Governing body: Pakistan Hindu Council

Location
- Location: Lahore, Punjab
- Country: Pakistan
- Coordinates: 31°32′59″N 74°20′37″E

Architecture
- Type: Hindu temple
- Temple: 1

Website
- Pakistan Hindu Council

The Krishna Mandir is a Hindu temple (mandir) dedicated to the Hindu deity Krishna located in Ravi Road, opposite of Timber Market in Lahore, Punjab, Pakistan. In 2006, the temple became a centre of controversy due to media reports on its demolition which later turned out incorrect. In the contemporary era, it is one of two functional Hindu temples in Lahore, the other being Valmiki Mandir.

== 2006 reported demolition ==
Ravi Road is the main Entrance of Lahore from Shahdra, Sheikhupura, Gujranwala & Lahore Ring Road by Niazi Chowk (Batti Chowk), This temple is managed and maintained by the Evacuee Trust Property Board (EPTB).

The Evacuee Trust Property Board had previously allocated a sum of Rs 1.2 million in January 2005 for the renovation and extension of Krishna Mandir. The temple had been badly damaged in clashes that took place after the demolition of the Babri Mosque in the city of Ayodhya, in the state of Uttar Pradesh, in India on 6 December 1992. The website of the Minorities Affairs Division of the Pakistan government states that the tender for the renovation and extension of the temple was awarded on 31 March 2005, and over half of the work had been completed by 30 June 2005. The temple was to be entirely restored by June 2006.

On 28 May 2006, Pakistani newspaper Dawn reported that the temple was destroyed to pave the way for construction of a multi-storied commercial building. When Dawn reporters attempted to take photographs of the alleged site, they were asked to leave by representatives of the developer, who denied claims of a Hindu temple having existed at the site. EPTB officials reportedly concealed the fact that the structure had been a temple from the chairman to obtain his approval to allow the developer to demolish the structure.

Mumbai-based Daily News & Analysis released reports claiming that the priest of the demolished temple, Kashi Ram, many opposition members of the National Assembly belonging to the Pakistan Peoples Party and Pakistan Muslim League, had attempted to block the demolition by moving a motion in Parliament. However, influential members of the ruling party considered close to the builders, in cooperation with EPTB chairman, Lt Gen Zulfiqar Ali Khan, blocked the efforts and got the temple demolished.

Several political parties in Pakistan were reported to have objected to the alleged demolition, such as the Pakistan People's party and the Pakistani Muslim League-N. They reportedly moved a motion against the destruction, saying such an act could have a bearing on Pakistan's relations with neighboring countries.

A firm of lawyers representing the Hindu minority approached the Lahore High Court seeking a directive to the builders to stop the construction of the commercial plaza and reconstruct the temple at the site. The petitioners maintained that the demolition violated section 295 of the Pakistan Penal Code prohibiting the destruction of places of worship.

News of the demolition also evoked strong condemnation from in India from minority bodies and political parties, including the Bharatiya Janata Party (BJP), the Congress, as well as Muslim advocacy political parties such as the All India Muslim Majlis-e-Mushawarat. Amid growing condemnation of the demolition of the only temple in Lahore, the Indian government said in June 2006 that it has 'taken up' the matter with the Pakistan High Commission.

=== Refutation and withdrawal of legal action ===
On 15 June 2006, the Foreign Office of Pakistan denied reports of the demolition as "incorrect and baseless", and confirmed that the temple is safe. It pointed out that the property that was demolished was several kilometers away from the temple. Ejazul Haq, Minister for Religious Affairs, said that the temple is in "perfect condition". He responded to remarks from BJP leader L.K. Advani that minorities in Pakistan do not have religious freedom, by inviting Advani to "visit Lahore and pray at the temple".

Om Prakash Narayan, secretary-general of the Pakistan Minority Welfare Council and a Hindu, had moved the Lahore High Court on 16 June to stop construction on the website, and the court issued a stay order and requested the Lahore Development Authority to provide information on the history of the site. By 30 June 2006, Narayan had withdrawn his writ, saying the temple was intact and he had filed the petition because of a misunderstanding. Narayan was reported as saying:

"…after visiting the place and being told by the locals that there was no temple where the plaza was being constructed, I decided to file an application in the court to withdraw my petition against the federal secretary of Religious Affairs and Evacuee Property Trust Board (ETPB) chairman."

Narayan criticized remarks by BJP leaders as misleading and accused them of attempting to damage India-Pakistan relations.

The Pakistan Hindu Council confirmed that no Krishna temple had been demolished in Lahore.

== See also ==
- Hinduism in Pakistan
- Evacuee Trust Property Board
- Lava temple, Lahore fort
- Valmiki Mandir, Lahore
- Temples in Lahore
- Hinglaj Mata
- Katasraj temple
- Multan Sun Temple
- Prahladpuri Temple, Multan
- Sadh Belo
- Shiv Mandir, Umerkot
- Shri Varun Dev Mandir
- Tilla Jogian
