= Lava Temple =

Lava Temple of Lahore
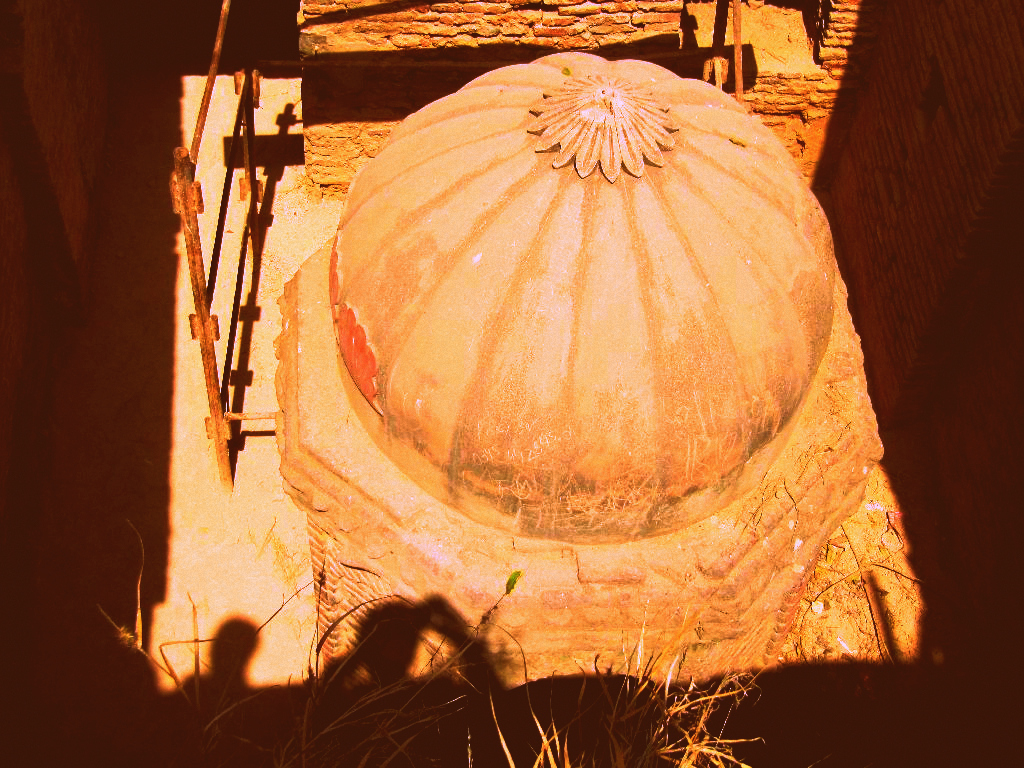
- A view of the temple’s dome from the walls of the Lahore Fort

- Location within Pakistan

Religion
- Affiliation: Hinduism
- Deity: Lava (Ramayana)
- Governing body: Pakistan Hindu Council

Location
- Location: Lahore, Punjab Pakistan
- Interactive map of Lava Temple of Lahore
- Coordinates: 31°35′18″N 74°18′46.4″E

Architecture
- Type: Hindu temple
- Temple: 1

Website
- Pakistan Hindu Council

Lava Temple (Urdu: لو مندر) is a Hindu place of worship dedicated to the Hindu deity Lava, the son of Rama. It is in Lahore Fort, Lahore, Pakistan, and dates to the Sikh period. According to a Hindu legend, Lahore is named after him.

== Etymology ==
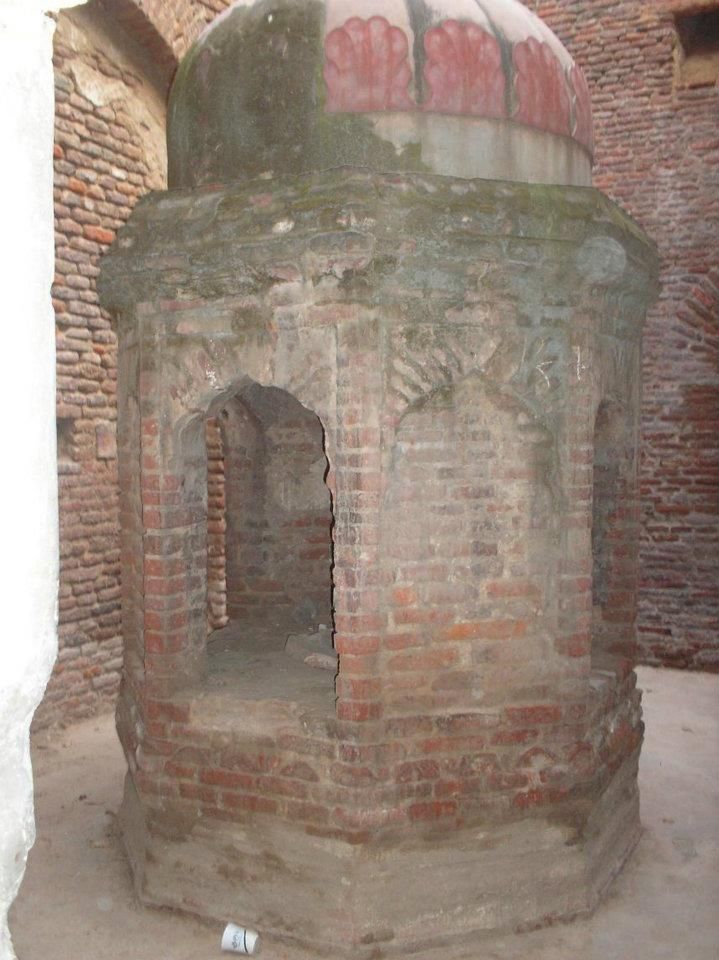
Temple of Loh in Lahore.

In the Deshwa Bhaga, Lahore is called 'Lavpor', which points to its origin from Lav, the son of Rama. In the ancient annals of Rajputana, the name given is 'Loh Kot', meaning “the fort of Loh” which, again, has reference to its founder, Rama's son.

== History ==
A legend based on oral traditions holds that 'Lahore', known in ancient times as 'Lavapuri' (City of Lava in Sanskrit), was founded by Prince Lava, the son of Sita and Rama. Kasur was founded by his twin brother Prince Kusha.

To this day, Lahore Fort has a vacant temple dedicated to Lava (also pronounced Loh, hence Loh-awar or "The Fort of Loh").

== Management ==
Currently this temple is under the control of Pakistan Government and is managed by the Pakistan Hindu Council.

== See also ==
- Hinduism in Pakistan
- Evacuee Trust Property Board
- Pakistan Hindu Council
- Krishna Mandir, Lahore
- Valmiki Mandir, Lahore
- Temples in Lahore
