= Valmiki Mandir =

Valmiki Mandir, Lahore والمیکی مندر
- Location within Punjab, Pakistan Location within Pakistan Location within Asia

Religion
- Affiliation: Hinduism
- District: Lahore
- Deity: Valmiki
- Governing body: Pakistan Hindu Council

Location
- Location: Neela Gumbad
- State: Punjab
- Country: Pakistan
- Interactive map of Valmiki Mandir, Lahore والمیکی مندر
- Coordinates: 31°34′07.0″N 74°18′40.9″E

Architecture
- Type: Hindu temple
- Temple: 1

Website
- Pakistan Hindu Council

Valmiki Temple (Urdu: والمیکی مندر), also called Nila Gumbad Valmiki temple is a Hindu temple dedicated to Hindu sage Valmiki located in the Bhim Street in the Neela Gumbad area of Anarkali Bazar in Lahore, Pakistan. The temple is managed and maintained by the Pakistan Hindu Council and Evacuee Trust Property Board. In the contemporary era, the Krishna Temple and the Valmiki Temple are the only two functional Hindu temples in Lahore. The temple is located in New Anarkali.

== History ==
The Valmiki Mandir in Lahore is regarded as one of the city’s oldest surviving Hindu places of worship, with origins traced by local heritage accounts to around 1,200 years ago.

In 1992, as a retaliation to the Babri Mosque incident in India, the temple was attacked. A violent mob carrying weapons entered into the temple and smashing the idols. They also looted the gold from the temple and set the temple on fire.

Following the Partition of India in 1947, the temple complex came under the control of a local family who claimed ownership of the site. Reports indicate that members of this christian family had converted to Hinduism while continuing to manage access to the shrine. Over time, disputes arose between the occupants and Hindu community members regarding access for worship and the upkeep of the premises.

In 2022, Pakistan’s Evacuee Trust Property Board (ETPB) — the federal body responsible for managing properties left behind by migrants after Partition — initiated a legal process to reclaim the temple. The ETPB argued that the site was evacuee trust property dedicated to religious use and therefore not subject to private ownership. After court proceedings, the occupants (a Christian family living there for around two decades) were evicted and the temple was taken back into public custodianship.

Following its recovery, the ETPB carried out basic repairs and reopened the temple to the Hindu community in August 2022.

== Festivals ==
The major celebrations are Diwali and Holi.

== See also ==
- Hinduism in Pakistan
- Hinduism in Punjab, Pakistan
