= Sikhism in Pakistan =

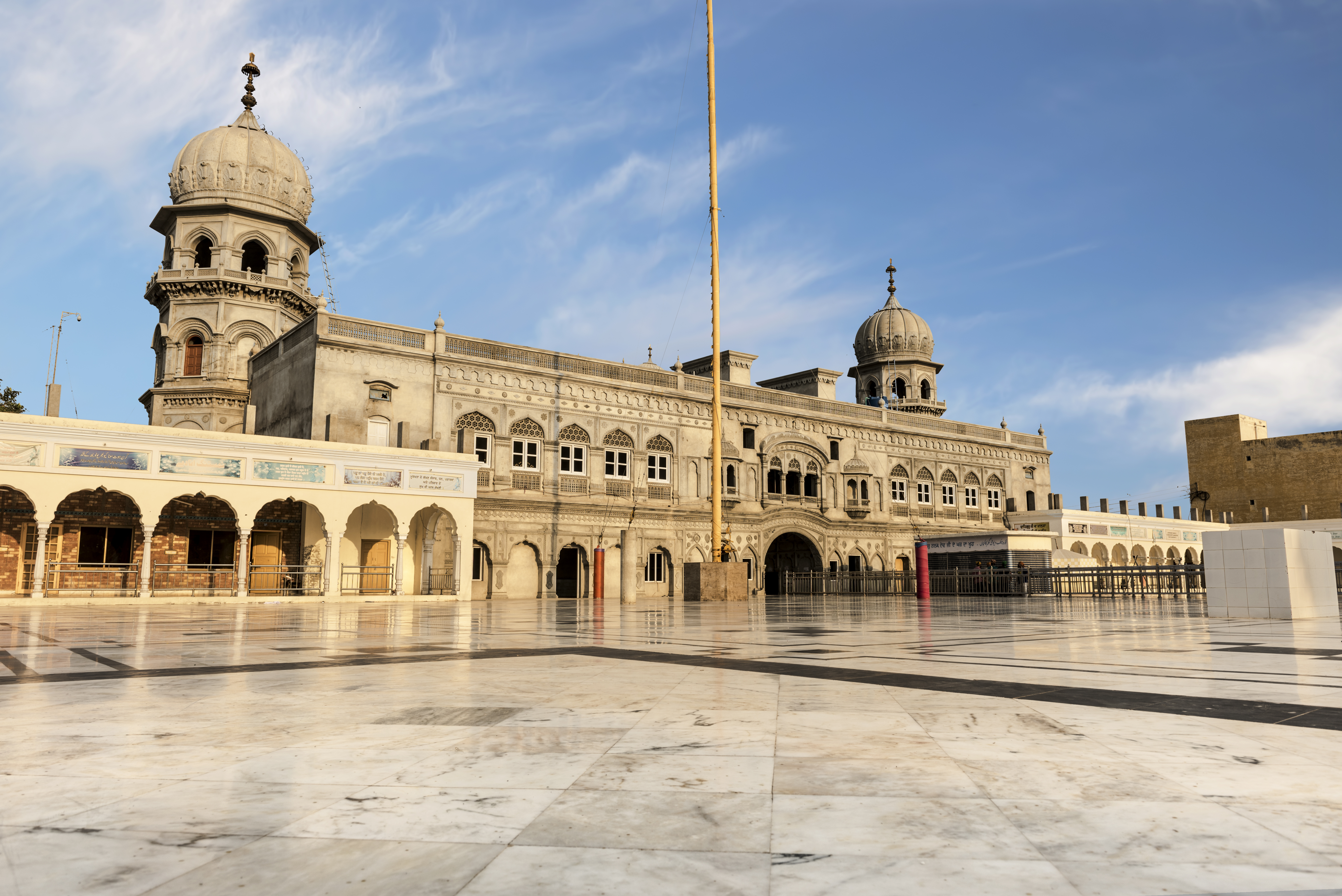
- Gurdwara Janam Asthan

Total population
- 15,998 ▲(2023 census)

Regions with significant populations
- Punjab: 5,649
- Sindh: 5,182
- Khyber Pakhtunkhwa: 4,050
- Balochistan: 1,057

Languages
- Punjabi • Urdu • Pashto • Sindhi • Balochi • Pakistani English

Sikhism is a minority religion in Pakistan with a population of around 16,000 Sikhs, accounting for 0.01% of the national population. Although Sikhs form a small community in Pakistan today, Sikhism has an extensive heritage and history in the country. Sikhism originated from what is now Punjab, Pakistan in the 15th century. By the 18th and 19th centuries, the Sikh community had become a major political power in Punjab, with Sikh leader maharaja Ranjit Singh founding the Sikh Empire which had its capital in Lahore, today the second-largest city in Pakistan. Nankana Sahib, the birthplace of Guru Nanak, the founder of Sikhism, is located in Pakistani Punjab; moreover, Kartarpur Sahib, the place where Guru Nanak died and was subsequently buried, is also located in the same province.

According to the 1941 census, the Sikh population comprised roughly 1.67 million persons or 6.1 percent of the total population in the region that would ultimately become Pakistan, (Note: 1941 figure taken from census data by combining the total population of all administrative divisions that compose the region of contemporary Pakistan, including Punjab, (Note: 1941 figure taken from census data by combining the total population of all districts (Lahore, Sialkot, Gujranwala, Sheikhupura, Gujrat, Shahpur, Jhelum, Rawalpindi, Attock, Mianwali, Montgomery, Lyallpur, Jhang, Multan, Muzaffargargh, Dera Ghazi Khan), one tehsil (Shakargarh – then part of Gurdaspur District), one princely state (Bahawalpur), and one tract (Biloch Trans–Frontier) in Punjab Province, British India that ultimately fell on the western side of the Radcliffe Line. See 1941 census data here: Immediately following the partition of India in 1947, these districts and tract would ultimately make up the subdivision of West Punjab, which also later included Bahawalpur. The state that makes up this region in the contemporary era is Punjab, Pakistan.) Sindh, (Note: 1941 figure taken from census data by combining the total population of all districts (Dadu, Hyderabad, Karachi, Larkana, Nawabshah, Sukkur, Tharparkar, Upper Sind Frontier), and one princely state (Khairpur), in Sindh Province, British India. See 1941 census data here:) Khyber Pakhtunkhwa, (Note: Religious data only collected in North West Frontier Province, and not in the Federally Administered Tribal Areas. Total responses to religion includes North West Frontier Province, and total population includes both North West Frontier Province and the Federally Administered Tribal Areas, both administrative divisions which later amalgamated to become Khyber Pakhtunkhwa.) Balochistan, Azad Jammu and Kashmir, (Note: 1941 figure taken from census data by combining the total population of two districts (Mirpur and Muzaffarabad) and one Jagir (Poonch) in the Princely State of Jammu and Kashmir that ultimately would be administered by Pakistan, in the contemporary self-administrative territory of Azad Jammu and Kashmir. See 1941 census data here:) and Gilgit–Baltistan. (Note: 1941 figure taken from census data by combining the total population of one district (Astore) and one agency (Gilgit) in the Princely State of Jammu and Kashmir that ultimately would be administered by Pakistan, in the contemporary administrative territory of Gilgit–Baltistan. See 1941 census data here:)) notably concentrated in West Punjab, within the contemporary province of Punjab, Pakistan, where the Sikh population stood at roughly 1.52 million persons or 8.8 percent of the total population. By 1947, it is estimated that the Sikh population had increased to over 2 million persons in the region which became Pakistan with significant populations existing in the largest cities in the Punjab such as Lahore, Rawalpindi and Faisalabad (then Lyallpur). With communal violence and religious cleansing accompanying the Partition of British India at the time, the vast majority departed the region en masse, primarily migrating eastward to the region of Punjab that would fall on the eastern side of the Radcliffe Line and Delhi, with corresponding mass migration of Muslims into Pakistan from India.

In the decades following Pakistan's formation in 1947, the Pakistani Sikh community began to reorganize, forming the Pakistan Sikh Gurdwara Prabandhak Committee (PSGPC) to represent the community and protect the holy sites and heritage of the Sikh religion in Pakistan. It is headquartered at Gurdwara Dera Sahib in Lahore. The Pakistani government has granted permission to Sikhs from India to make pilgrimages to Sikh places of worship in Pakistan and for Pakistani Sikhs to travel to India.

== History ==
=== Colonial era ===
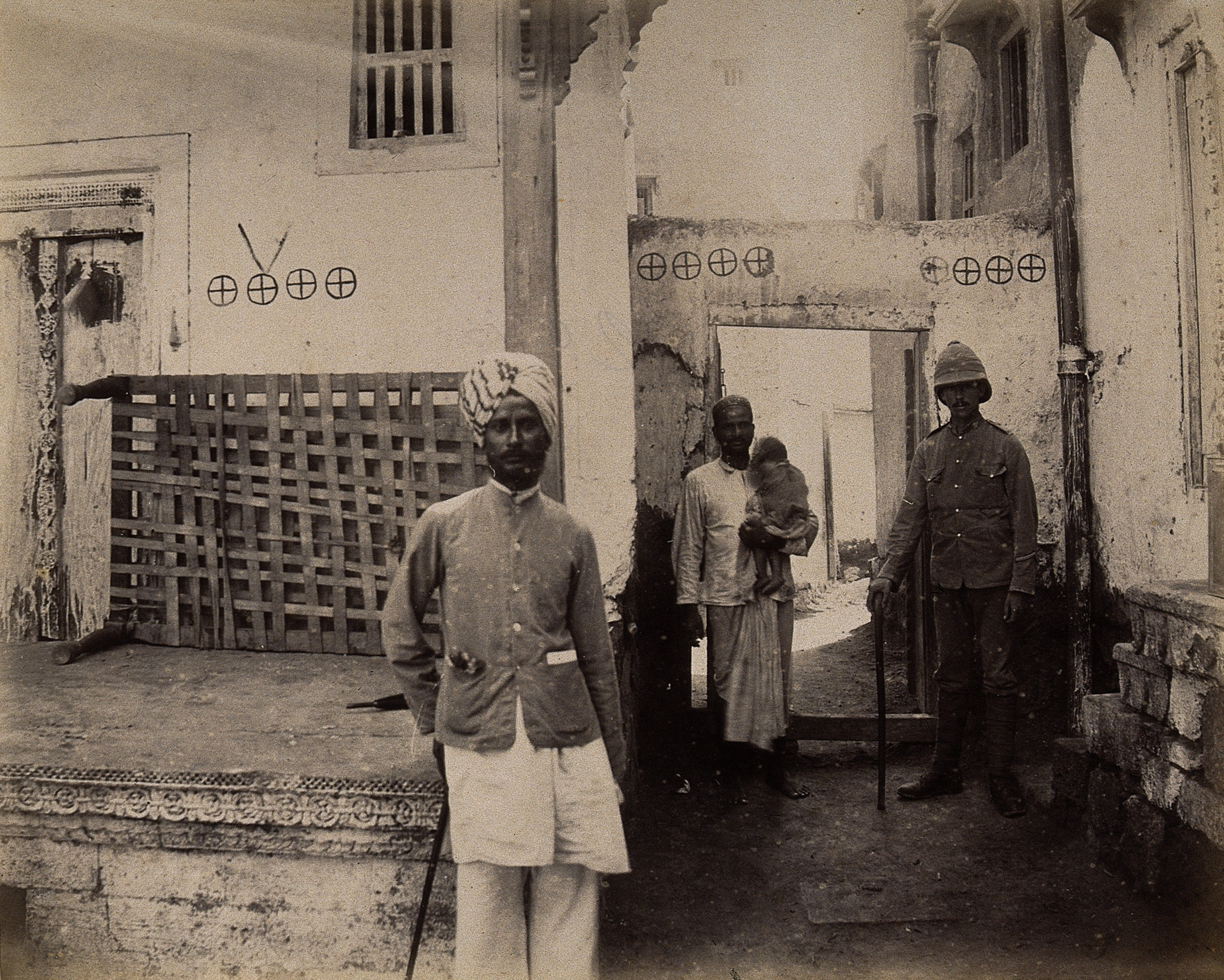
Photograph of a Sikh health worker of the Karachi Plague Committee in Old Town, Karachi, by R. Jalbhoy, 1897

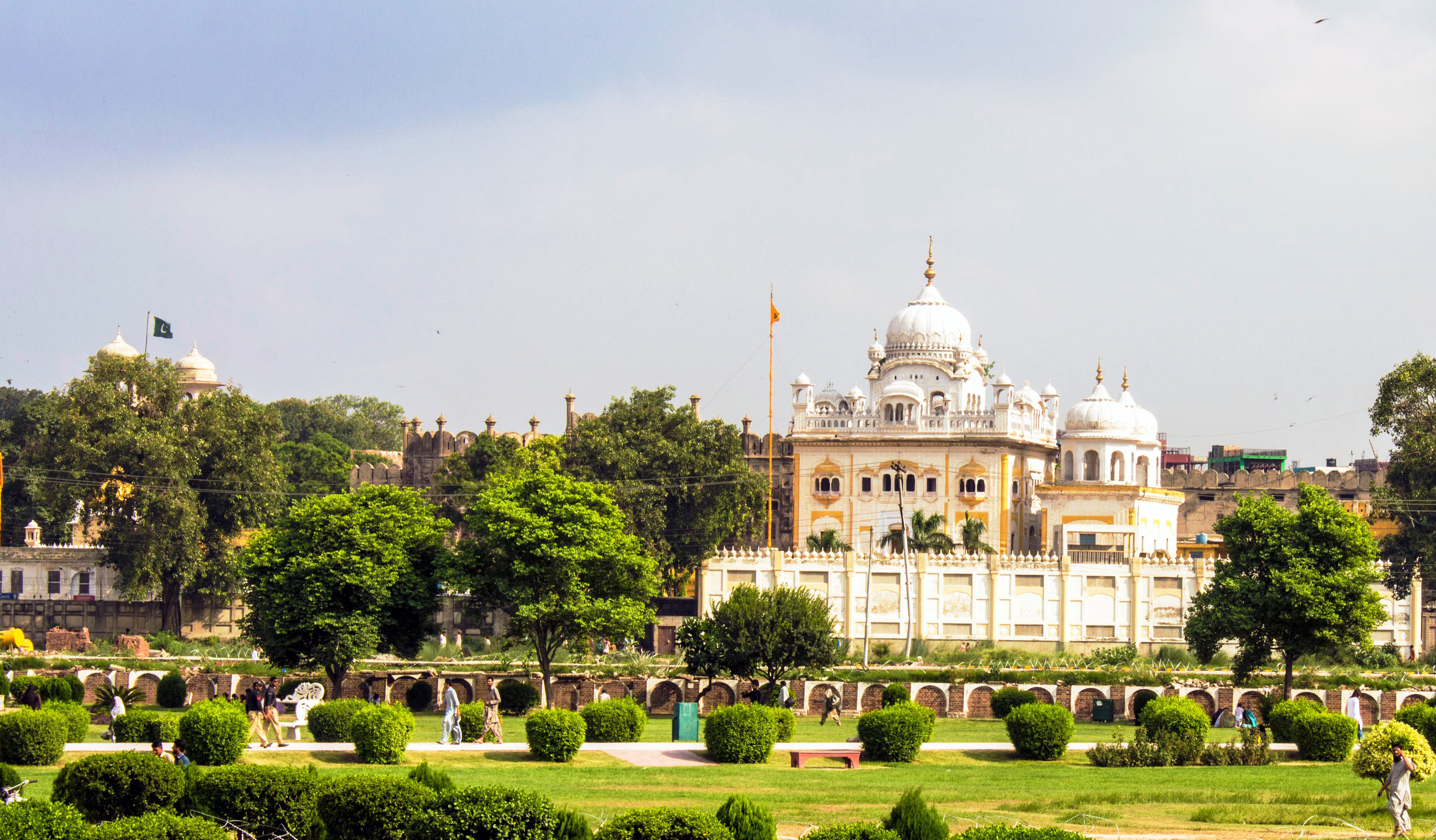
Gurdwara Dera Sahib, Lahore

Prior to independence in 1947, 2 million Sikhs resided in the present day Pakistan and were spread all across northern Pakistan, specifically the Punjab region and played an important role in its economy as farmers, businessmen, and traders. Significant populations of Sikhs inhabited the largest cities in the Punjab such as Lahore, Rawalpindi and Lyallpur. Lahore, the capital of Punjab, is the location of many important Sikh religious and historical sites, including the Samadhi of Maharaja Ranjit Singh.The nearby town of Nankana Sahib has nine gurdwaras, and is the birthplace of Sikhism's founder, Guru Nanak.

==== Partition of India (1947) ====
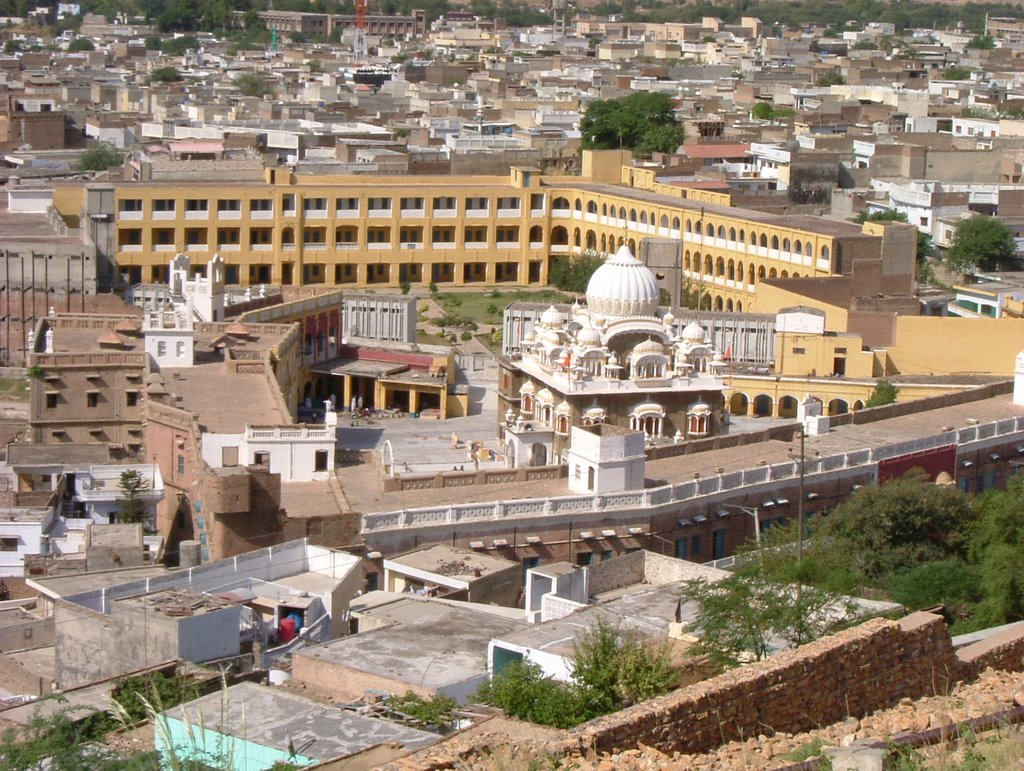
Exterior of Panja Sahib Gurdwara in Hasan Abdal

Sikh organizations, including the Chief Khalsa Dewan and Shiromani Akali Dal led by Master Tara Singh, reacted negatively to the Lahore Resolution and the Pakistan movement, viewing it as welcoming possible persecution; the Sikhs largely thus strongly opposed the partition of India. The majority of the Sikhs and Hindus of West Punjab and Sindh provinces of Pakistan migrated to India after the independence of Pakistan in 1947, with a small community of the Sikhs remaining. These Sikh and Hindu refugee communities have had a major influence in the culture and economics of Delhi. Today, segments of the populations of East Punjab and Haryana states and Delhi in India can trace their ancestry back to towns and villages now in Pakistan, including former Indian Prime Minister Manmohan Singh. According to Khushwant Singh, approximately 2.5 million Sikhs vacated Pakistan after the country's formation in 1947. According to the Military Evacuation Organization (E.M.O.) on 15 November 1947, around 3,680 non-Muslims (including Sikhs) remained in West Punjab immediately after partition that occurred three months prior on 15 August 1947.

=== Modern era ===
Sikhs have mainly kept a low profile within the monolithic Muslim population of Pakistan. Though Pakistan maintains the title of Islamic state, the articles twenty, twenty-one and twenty-two in chapter two of its constitution guarantees religious freedom to the non-Muslim residents.

From 1984 to 2002, Pakistan held a system of separate electorates for all its national legislative assemblies, with a handful of parliamentary seats reserved for minority members. Minorities were legally only permitted to vote for designated minority candidates in general elections.

The regime of former President General Pervez Musharraf had professed an agenda of equality for minorities and promotion and protection of minority rights, however, the implementation of corrective measures has been slow. Considerable amount of Sikhs are found in neighbourhood called Narayanpura of Karachi's Ranchore Lines.

The historical and holy sites of Sikhs are maintained by a Pakistani governmental body, the Pakistan Sikh Gurdwara Prabandhak Committee, which is responsible for their upkeep and preservation. The 2010s saw a renewed interest especially amongst scholars regarding Sikh heritage remaining in Pakistan.

==== The emergence of the Sikh community within Pakistan ====
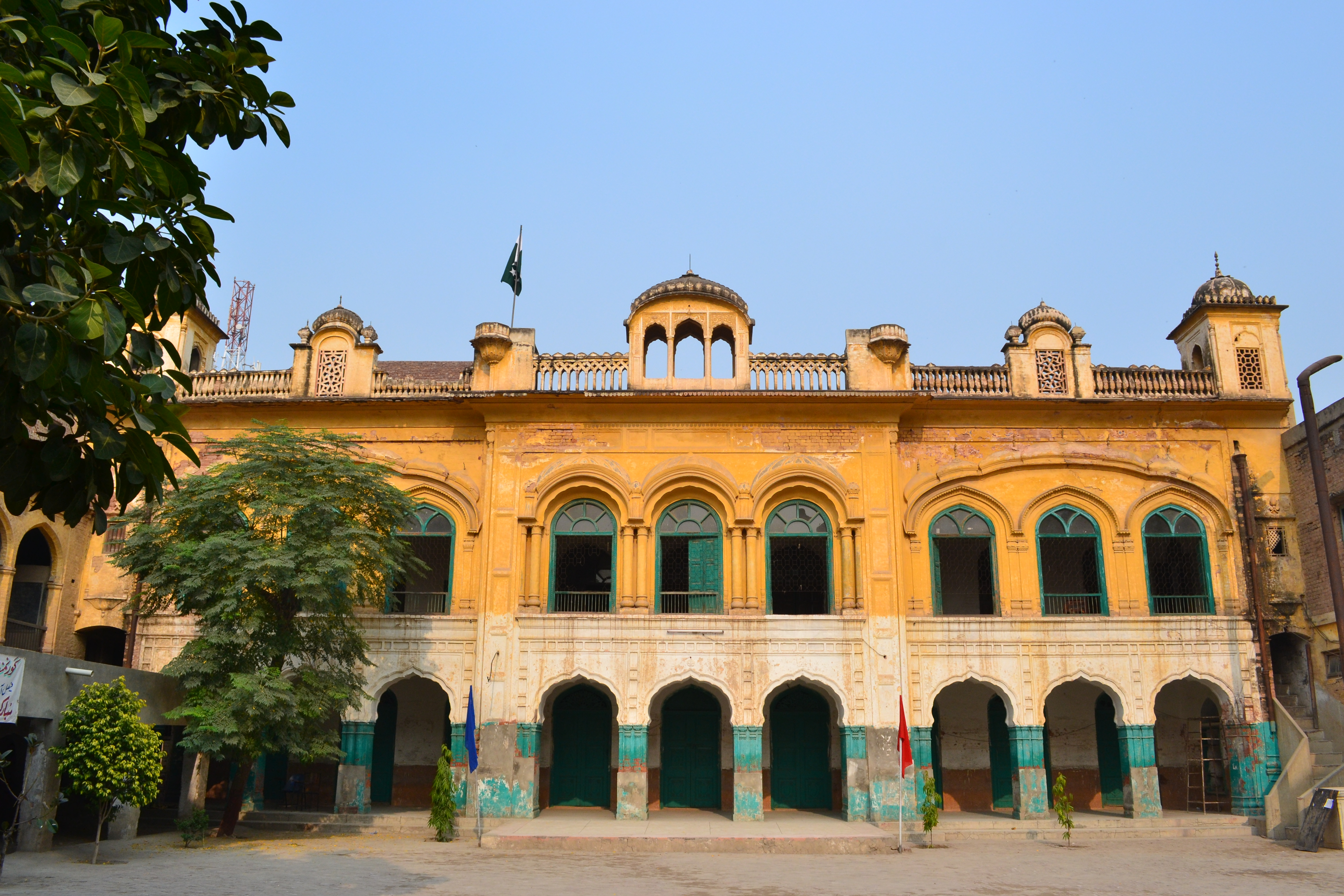
Gurdwara in Layallpur-Faisalabad

After the independence of Pakistan and the migration of nearly all Sikhs to India the Sikh community's rights were significantly diminished as their population decreased. Today, the largest urban Sikh population in Pakistan is found in Peshawar, in the Khyber-Pakhtunkhwa, where the Pashtun law of "nanawati" (protection) spared the scale of violence which had raged across the Indus River in Punjab. Despite the longstanding tensions between the Sikh and Muslim communities in South Asia, the Pashtuns were tolerant towards the religious minority of Sikhs. There are small pockets of Sikhs in Lahore and Nankana Sahib in Punjab.

There has been an influx of Sikh refugees from Afghanistan to Pakistan due to the turbulent civil war and conflicts that have ravaged neighboring Afghanistan, and many of these Sikhs have settled in Peshawar. Afghanistan, like Pakistan, has had small Sikh and Hindu populations. There has been a massive exodus of refugees from Afghanistan into Pakistan during the past 30 years of turmoil up to the reign of the Taliban and the subsequent US invasion of Afghanistan in late 2001. Due to Pakistan's porous borders with Afghanistan, large numbers of Afghanistan's minority communities, based mainly around the cities of Kabul, Kandahar, and Jalalabad have fled, and some Sikhs have joined their kinsmen in Peshawar and Lahore.

The Pakistani Constitution states that Sikhism is a monotheistic religion. Recently the Sikh community within Pakistan has been making every effort possible to progress in Pakistan. For example, Hercharn Singh became the first Sikh to join the Pakistan Army. For the first time in the 58-year history of Pakistan there has a Sikh been selected into Pakistan's army. Prior to Harcharan Singh's selection in the Pakistani army no individual person who was a member of the Hindu or the Sikh community were ever enrolled in the army, however; the Pakistani Christian community has prominently served in the Pakistan Armed Forces and some had even reached the ranks of Major Generals in the army, Air Vice Marshals in the Pakistan Air Force and rear Admiral in the Pakistan Navy. It has received various awards for gallantry and valor. Moreover, members of the tiny Parsi community have some representation in the Armed Forces. Other prominent Sikhs are Inspector Amarjeet Singh of Pakistan Rangers and Lance-naik Behram Singh of Pakistan Coast Guard.

In 2007, the Pakistan Government enacted the Sikh marriage act that allows Sikh marriages in Pakistan be registered. In 2017, the Punjab legislative assembly passed the Anand Karaj act thereby allowing the Sikh marriage in Punjab province be registered. In the Sindh province, the Sikh marriages are registered under the Sindh Hindu Marriage Act of 2016.

== Demographics ==
Sikh Population History in Pakistan:
Year	Pop.	±% p.a.
1901	529,910	—
1911	884,987	+5.26%
1921	931,489	+0.51%
1931	1,282,698	+3.25%
1941	1,672,753	+2.69%
1951	1,476	−50.50%
1981	2,146	+1.26%
1990	2,898	+3.39%
1993	3,374	+5.20%
2023	15,998	+5.32%
Source: (Note: 1901 figure taken from census data by combining the total population of all administrative divisions that compose the region of contemporary Pakistan, including Punjab, (Note: 1901 figure taken from census data by combining the total population of all districts (Lahore, Sialkot, Gujranwala, Gujrat, Shahpur, Jhelum, Rawalpindi, Mianwali, Montgomery, Lyallpur (inscribed as the Chenab Colony on the 1901 census), Jhang, Multan, Muzaffargargh, Dera Ghazi Khan), one tehsil (Shakargarh – then part of Gurdaspur District), one princely state (Bahawalpur), and one tract (Biloch Trans–Frontier) in Punjab Province, British India that ultimately fell on the western side of the Radcliffe Line. See 1901 census data here: Immediately following the partition of India in 1947, these districts and tract would ultimately make up the subdivision of West Punjab, which also later included Bahawalpur. The state that makes up this region in the contemporary era is Punjab, Pakistan.) Sindh, (Note: 1901 figure taken from census data by combining the total population of all districts (Karachi, Hyderabad, Shikarpur, Tharparkar, Upper Sind Frontier), and one princely state (Khairpur), in Sindh Province, British India. See 1901 census data here:) Khyber Pakhtunkhwa, Balochistan, Azad Jammu and Kashmir, (Note: 1901 figure taken from census data by combining the total population of two districts (Bhimber and Muzaffarabad) and one Jagir (Poonch) in the Princely State of Jammu and Kashmir that ultimately would be administered by Pakistan, in the contemporary self-administrative territory of Azad Jammu and Kashmir. See 1901 census data here:) and Gilgit–Baltistan. (Note: 1901 figure taken from census data using the total population of Gilgit District in the Princely State of Jammu and Kashmir that ultimately would be administered by Pakistan, in the contemporary administrative territory of Gilgit–Baltistan. See 1901 census data here:)) (Note: 1911 figure taken from census data by combining the total population of all administrative divisions that compose the region of contemporary Pakistan, including Punjab, (Note: 1911 figure taken from census data by combining the total population of all districts (Lahore, Sialkot, Gujranwala, Gujrat, Shahpur, Jhelum, Rawalpindi, Attock, Mianwali, Montgomery, Lyallpur, Jhang, Multan, Muzaffargargh, Dera Ghazi Khan), one tehsil (Shakargarh – then part of Gurdaspur District), one princely state (Bahawalpur), and one tract (Biloch Trans–Frontier) in Punjab Province, British India that ultimately fell on the western side of the Radcliffe Line. See 1911 census data here: Immediately following the partition of India in 1947, these districts and tract would ultimately make up the subdivision of West Punjab, which also later included Bahawalpur. The state that makes up this region in the contemporary era is Punjab, Pakistan.) Sindh, (Note: 1911 figure taken from census data by combining the total population of all districts (Hyderabad, Karachi, Larkana, Sukkur, Tharparkar, Upper Sind Frontier), and one princely state (Khairpur), in Sindh Province, British India. See 1911 census data here:) Khyber Pakhtunkhwa, Balochistan, Azad Jammu and Kashmir, (Note: 1911 figure taken from census data by combining the total population of two districts (Mirpur and Muzaffarabad) and one Jagir (Poonch) in the Princely State of Jammu and Kashmir that ultimately would be administered by Pakistan, in the contemporary self-administrative territory of Azad Jammu and Kashmir. See 1911 census data here:) and Gilgit–Baltistan. (Note: 1911 figure taken from census data by combining the total population of Gilgit District and the Frontier Ilaqas in the Princely State of Jammu and Kashmir that ultimately would be administered by Pakistan, in the contemporary administrative territory of Gilgit–Baltistan. See 1911 census data here:)) (Note: 1921 figure taken from census data by combining the total population of all administrative divisions that compose the region of contemporary Pakistan, including Punjab, (Note: 1921 figure taken from census data by combining the total population of all districts (Lahore, Sialkot, Gujranwala, Sheikhupura, Gujrat, Shahpur, Jhelum, Rawalpindi, Attock, Mianwali, Montgomery, Lyallpur, Jhang, Multan, Muzaffargargh, Dera Ghazi Khan), one tehsil (Shakargarh – then part of Gurdaspur District), one princely state (Bahawalpur), and one tract (Biloch Trans–Frontier) in Punjab Province, British India that ultimately fell on the western side of the Radcliffe Line. See 1921 census data here: Immediately following the partition of India in 1947, these districts and tract would ultimately make up the subdivision of West Punjab, which also later included Bahawalpur. The state that makes up this region in the contemporary era is Punjab, Pakistan.) Sindh, (Note: 1921 figure taken from census data by combining the total population of all districts (Hyderabad, Karachi, Larkana, Nawabshah, Sukkur, Tharparkar, Upper Sind Frontier), and one princely state (Khairpur), in Sindh Province, British India. See 1921 census data here:) Khyber Pakhtunkhwa, Balochistan, Azad Jammu and Kashmir, (Note: 1921 figure taken from census data by combining the total population of two districts (Mirpur and Muzaffarabad) and one Jagir (Poonch) in the Princely State of Jammu and Kashmir that ultimately would be administered by Pakistan, in the contemporary self-administrative territory of Azad Jammu and Kashmir. See 1921 census data here:) and Gilgit–Baltistan. (Note: 1921 figure taken from census data by combining the total population of Gilgit District and the Frontier Ilaqas in the Princely State of Jammu and Kashmir that ultimately would be administered by Pakistan, in the contemporary administrative territory of Gilgit–Baltistan. See 1921 census data here:)) (Note: 1931 figure taken from census data by combining the total population of all administrative divisions that compose the region of contemporary Pakistan, including Punjab, (Note: 1931 figure taken from census data by combining the total population of all districts (Lahore, Sialkot, Gujranwala, Sheikhupura, Gujrat, Shahpur, Jhelum, Rawalpindi, Attock, Mianwali, Montgomery, Lyallpur, Jhang, Multan, Muzaffargargh, Dera Ghazi Khan), one tehsil (Shakargarh – then part of Gurdaspur District), one princely state (Bahawalpur), and one tract (Biloch Trans–Frontier) in Punjab Province, British India that ultimately fell on the western side of the Radcliffe Line. See 1931 census data here: Immediately following the partition of India in 1947, these districts and tract would ultimately make up the subdivision of West Punjab, which also later included Bahawalpur. The state that makes up this region in the contemporary era is Punjab, Pakistan.) Sindh, (Note: 1931 figure taken from census data by combining the total population of all districts (Hyderabad, Karachi, Larkana, Nawabshah, Sukkur, Tharparkar, Upper Sind Frontier), and one princely state (Khairpur), in Sindh Province, British India. See 1931 census data here:) Khyber Pakhtunkhwa, Balochistan, Azad Jammu and Kashmir, and Gilgit–Baltistan. (Note: 1931 figure taken from census data by combining the total population of Gilgit District and the Frontier Ilaqas in the Princely State of Jammu and Kashmir that ultimately would be administered by Pakistan, in the contemporary administrative territory of Gilgit–Baltistan. See 1931 census data here:)) (Note: 1951 figure taken from census data by combining the total "Other" religious population of all administrative divisions that compose the region of contemporary Pakistan, including Punjab, Sindh, Khyber Pakhtunkhwa, and Balochistan.); Census of India, Census of Pakistan

Decadal censuses taken in British India revealed the religious composition of all administrative divisions that would ultimately compose regions situated in contemporary Pakistan. The 1901 Census in British India taken in administrative divisions that would ultimately compose regions situated in contemporary Pakistan indicated that Sikhs numbered approximately 529,910 persons and comprised roughly 3.0 percent of the total population, followed by an increase to around 884,987 persons or to 4.7 percent in 1911. The Sikh population would rise to approximately 931,489 persons in 1921 with the share of the total population rising to 4.8 percent, further increasing to 5.7 percent in 1931, with total Sikh population growing to roughly 1,282,698 persons.

According to the Government of Pakistan's National Database and Registration Authority, there were 6,146 Sikhs registered in Pakistan in 2012. A 2010 survey by the Sikh Resource and Study Centre reported 50,000 Sikhs living in Pakistan. Most are settled in Khyber Pakhtunkhwa followed by Sindh and Punjab. Other sources, including the US Department of State, claim the Sikh population in Pakistan to be as high as 20,000. In a news article published in December 2022, there was an estimated 30,000–35,000 Sikhs in Pakistan according to Gurpal Singh and Sikhs will be included as a separate category and enumerated on the 2023 Census of Pakistan. The results of the 2023 census will be a milestone in the first official inclusion of Sikhs since the formation of Pakistan as a sovereign nation. The National Database and Registration Authority (NADRA) has provided the numbers of eligible voters belonging to minority religions (registered in electoral rolls):

- 2013: 5,934 Sikh Voters
- 2018: 8,852 Sikh Voters

=== 1901 census ===
According to the 1901 census, the Sikh population in Pakistan comprised roughly 529,910 persons or 3.0 percent of the total population. With the exception of the Federally Administered Tribal Areas, all administrative divisions in the region that composes contemporary Pakistan collected religious data, with a combined population of 17,633,258, for an overall response rate of 99.6 percent out of the total population of 17,708,014, as detailed in the table below.

Sikhism in Pakistan by administrative division
Administrative division	1901 census			
Administrative division	Sikh Population	Sikh Percentage	Total Responses	Total Population
Punjab	483,999	4.64%	10,427,765	10,427,765
Khyber Pakhtunkhwa	25,733	1.25%	2,050,724	2,125,480
AJK	17,132	1.96%	872,915	872,915
Balochistan	2,972	0.37%	810,746	810,746
Gilgit–Baltistan	74	0.12%	60,885	60,885
Sindh	—N/a	—N/a	3,410,223	3,410,223
Pakistan	529,910	3.01%	17,633,258	17,708,014

=== 1911 census ===
According to the 1911 census, the Sikh population in Pakistan comprised roughly 884,987 persons or 4.7 percent of the total population. With the exception of the Federally Administered Tribal Areas, all administrative divisions in the region that composes contemporary Pakistan collected religious data, with a combined population of 18,806,379, for an overall response rate of 92.1 percent out of the total population of 20,428,473, as detailed in the table below.

Sikhism in Pakistan by administrative division
Administrative division	1911 census			
Administrative division	Sikh Population	Sikh Percentage	Total Responses	Total Population
Punjab	813,441	7.33%	11,104,585	11,104,585
Khyber Pakhtunkhwa	30,345	1.38%	2,196,933	3,819,027
AJK	20,391	2.39%	854,531	854,531
Sindh	12,339	0.33%	3,737,223	3,737,223
Balochistan	8,390	1.01%	834,703	834,703
Gilgit–Baltistan	81	0.1%	78,404	78,404
Pakistan	884,987	4.71%	18,806,379	20,428,473

=== 1921 census ===
According to the 1921 census, the Sikh population in Pakistan comprised roughly 931,489 persons or 4.8 percent of the total population. With the exception of the Federally Administered Tribal Areas, all administrative divisions in the region that composes contemporary Pakistan collected religious data, with a combined population of 19,389,016, for an overall response rate of 87.3 percent out of the total population of 22,214,152, as detailed in the table below.

Sikhism in Pakistan by administrative division
Administrative division	1921 census			
Administrative division	Sikh Population	Sikh Percentage	Total Responses	Total Population
Punjab	863,091	7.26%	11,888,985	11,888,985
Khyber Pakhtunkhwa	28,040	1.25%	2,251,340	5,076,476
AJK	24,491	2.76%	886,861	886,861
Sindh	8,036	0.23%	3,472,508	3,472,508
Balochistan	7,741	0.97%	799,625	799,625
Gilgit–Baltistan	90	0.1%	89,697	89,697
Pakistan	931,489	4.8%	19,389,016	22,214,152

=== 1931 census ===
According to the 1931 census, the Sikh population in Pakistan comprised roughly 1.28 million persons or 5.7 percent of the total population. With the exception of the Federally Administered Tribal Areas, all administrative divisions in the region that composes contemporary Pakistan collected religious data, with a combined population of 22,514,768, for an overall response rate of 90.9 percent out of the total population of 24,774,056, as detailed in the table below.

Sikhism in Pakistan by administrative division
Administrative division	1931 census			
Administrative division	Sikh Population	Sikh Percentage	Total Responses	Total Population
Punjab	1,180,789	8.41%	14,040,798	14,040,798
Khyber Pakhtunkhwa	42,510	1.75%	2,425,076	4,684,364
AJK (Note: 1931 figure taken from census data by combining the total population of two districts (Mirpur and Muzaffarabad) and one Jagir (Poonch) in the Princely State of Jammu and Kashmir that ultimately would be administered by Pakistan, in the contemporary self-administrative territory of Azad Jammu and Kashmir. See 1931 census data here:)	31,709	3.27%	969,578	969,578
Sindh	19,172	0.47%	4,114,253	4,114,253
Balochistan	8,425	0.97%	868,617	868,617
Gilgit–Baltistan	93	0.1%	96,446	96,446
Pakistan	1,282,698	5.7%	22,514,768	24,774,056

=== 1941 census ===
According to the 1941 census, the Sikh population in Pakistan comprised roughly 1.67 million persons or 6.1 percent of the total population. With the exception of the Federally Administered Tribal Areas, all administrative divisions in the region that compose contemporary Pakistan collected religious data, with a combined population of 27,266,001, for an overall response rate of 92.0 percent out of the total population of 29,643,600, as detailed in the table below.

Sikhism in Pakistan by administrative division
Administrative division	1941 Census			
Administrative division	Sikh Population	Sikh Percentage	Total Responses	Total Population
Punjab	1,530,112 (Note: Note: 186 villages and 2 towns — Khemkaran and Patti — in Kasur Tehsil (Lahore District) fell on the eastern punjab (Indian) side of the Radcliffe Line, but their population numbers are still included here as detailed sub-tehsil religious data did not exist at the time. According to the 1941 census, Kasur Tehsil had a total of 322 villages and 3 towns, roughly half fell on the western punjab (Pakistani) side of the Radcliffe Line.[54])	8.82%	17,350,103	17,350,103
Khyber Pakhtunkhwa	57,939	1.91%	3,038,067	5,415,666
AJK	39,910	3.72%	1,073,154	1,073,154
Sindh	32,627	0.67%	4,840,795	4,840,795
Balochistan	12,044	1.4%	857,835	857,835
Gilgit–Baltistan	121	0.1%	116,047	116,047
Pakistan	1,672,753	6.13%	27,266,001	29,643,600
Note: 186 villages and 2 towns — Khemkaran and Patti of Kasur Tehsil (Lahore District) fell on the eastern Punjab (Indian) side with the Radcliffe Line, but their population numbers are still included here as detailed sub-tehsil religious data did not exist at the time. According to the 1941 census, Kasur Tehsil had a total of 322 villages and 3 towns, roughly half fell on the western Punjab (Pakistani) side of the Radcliffe Line.

=== 1951 census ===
According to the 1951 census, the Sikh population in Pakistan comprised roughly 1,476 persons or 0.004 percent of the total population.

Sikhism in Pakistan by administrative division
Administrative division	1951 census			
Administrative division	Sikh Population	Sikh Percentage	Total Citizens	Total Population
Karachi Federal Capital Territory	1,214	0.11%	1,122,406 (Note: Excluding 4,011 persons claiming Nationalities other than Pakistani.)	1,126,417
Khyber Pakhtunkhwa	215	0.004%	5,864,550 (Note: Excluding 35,355 persons claiming Nationalities other than Pakistani.)	5,899,905
Punjab	35	0.0002%	20,636,702 (Note: Excluding 14,438 persons claiming Nationalities other than Pakistani.)	20,651,140
Sindh	12	0%	4,925,342 (Note: Excluding 2,715 persons claiming Nationalities other than Pakistani.)	4,928,057
Balochistan	0	0%	1,154,167 (Note: Excluding 19,869 persons claiming Nationalities other than Pakistani.)	1,174,036
Pakistan	1,476	0.004%	33,703,167 (Note: Excluding 76,388 persons claiming Nationalities other than Pakistani.)	33,779,555
Figure taken from census data by combining the total "Other" religious population of all administrative divisions that compose the region of contemporary Pakistan, including Punjab, Sindh, Khyber Pakhtunkhwa, and Balochistan. As Sikhism was not enumerated in the census, the population figure may represent members of other religious communities who were also not enumerated, some or all of whom may have been Sikhs.

=== 2023 census ===
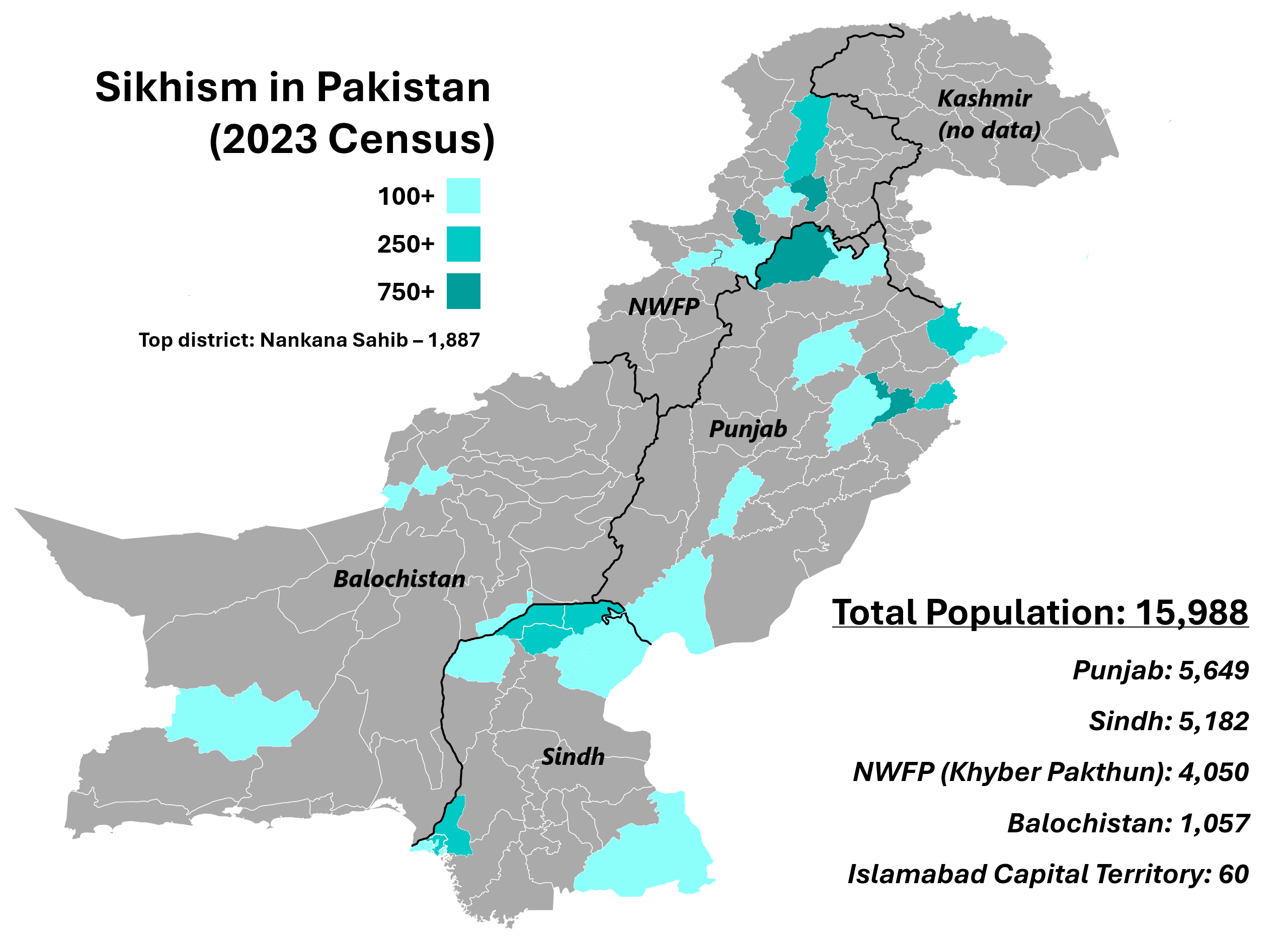
Geographical distribution - 2023

Pakistani Sikhs by Province - 2023 Census
Province	Total Population	Urban	Rural	Male	Female
Punjab	5,649	4,354	1,295	2,975	2,667
Sindh	5,182	3,540	1,642	2,782	2,382
Khyber Pakhtunkhwa	4,050	2,430	1,620	2,084	1,964
Balochistan	1,057	468	589	633	420
Islamabad	60	37	23	36	24
Pakistan	15,988	10,829	5,169	8,510	7,457

In Punjab, Sikhs are concentrated in the cities of Hasan Abdal and Nankana Sahib, where they form over 1% of population; and the districts of Lahore and Sialkot. In Khyber Pakhtunkhwa they number more than 1,000 each in the districts of Buner and Peshawar. In Sindh the largest Sikh population is found in Karachi.

== Geographical distribution ==
=== Punjab ===
Sikh Population History Punjab, Pakistan
Year	Pop.	±% p.a.
1881	272,908	—
1901	483,999	+2.91%
1911	813,441	+5.33%
1921	863,091	+0.59%
1931	1,180,789	+3.18%
1941	1,530,112	+2.63%
1951	35	−65.65%
1981	832	+11.14%
2023	5,649	+4.67%
Source: (Note: 1881 figure taken from census data by combining the total population of all districts (Lahore, Sialkot, Gujranwala, Gujrat, Shahpur, Jhelum, Rawalpindi, Montgomery, Jhang, Multan, Muzaffargargh, Dera Ghazi Khan), one tehsil (Shakargarh – then part of Gurdaspur District), and one princely state (Bahawalpur) in Punjab Province, British India that ultimately fell on the western side of the Radcliffe Line. See 1881 census data here: Immediately following the partition of India in 1947, these districts and tract would ultimately make up the subdivision of West Punjab, which also later included Bahawalpur. The state that makes up this region in the contemporary era is Punjab, Pakistan.); Census of India, Census of Pakistan

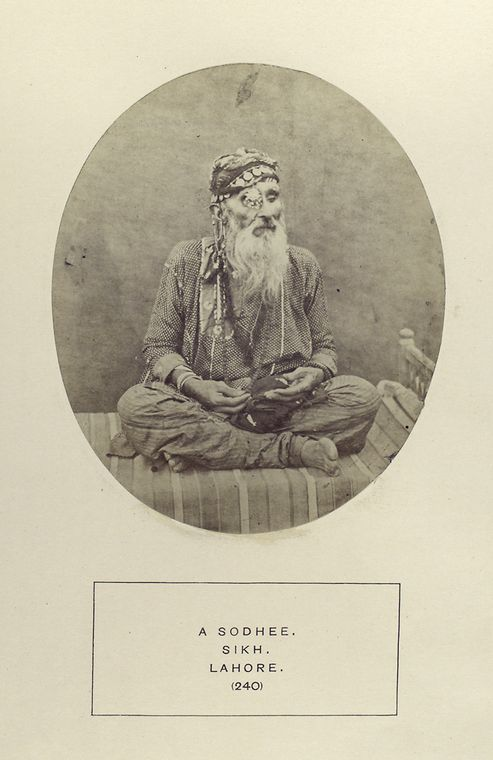
A Sodhi Sikh, Lahore, 1875.

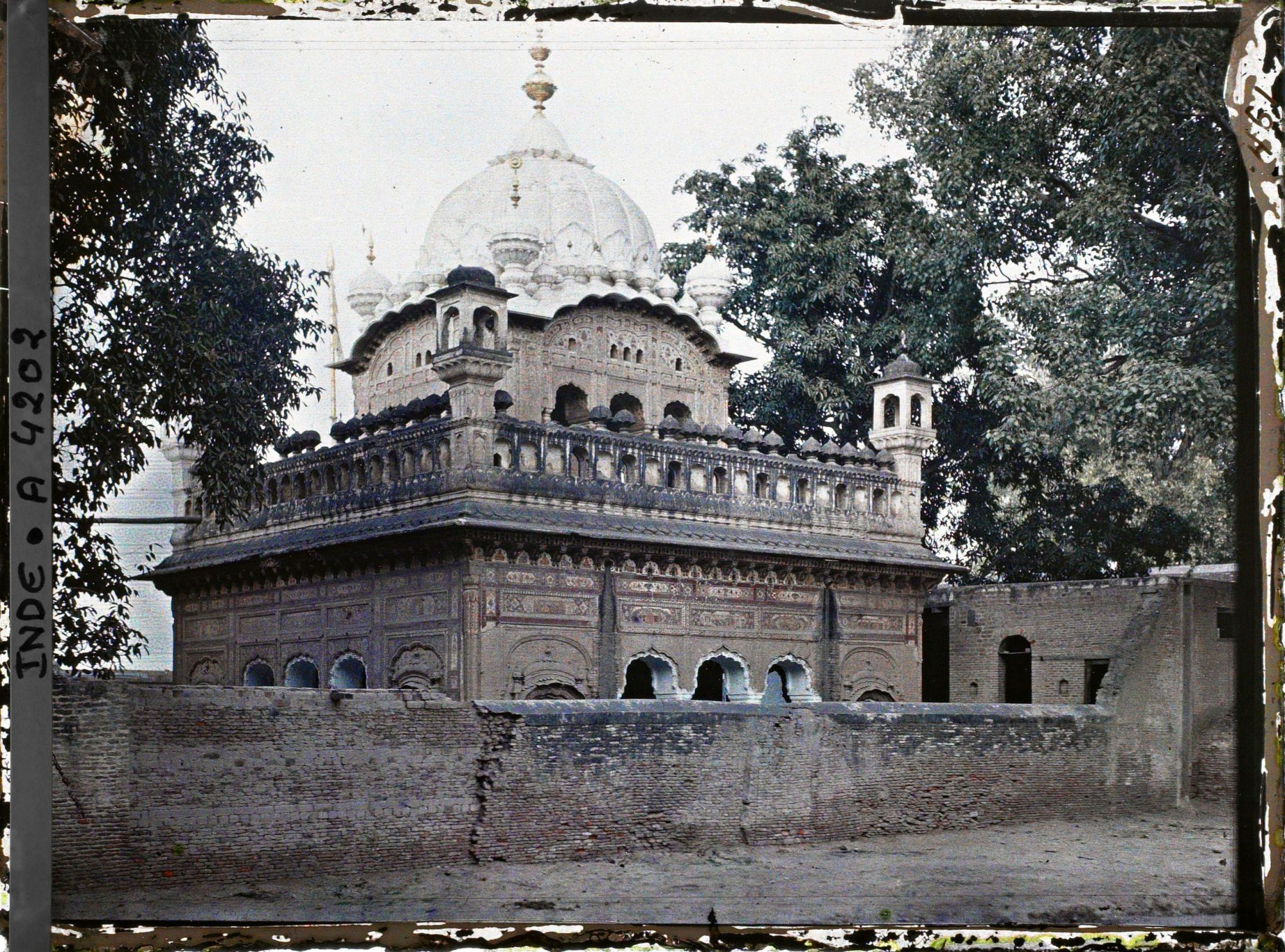
Gurdwara Dera Sahib in Lahore (1914).

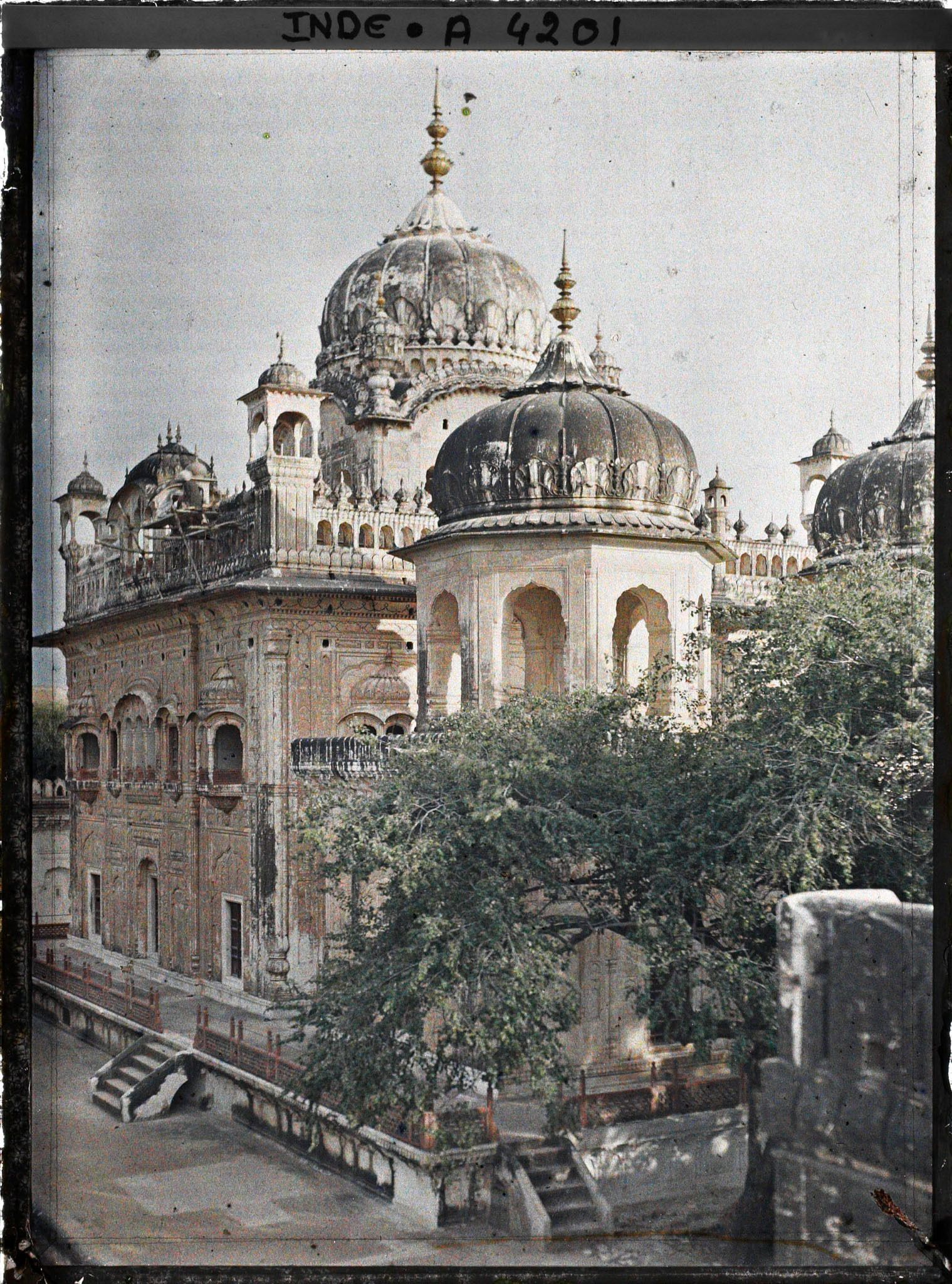
The Samadhi (mausoleum) of Ranjit Singh, Lahore, 1914.

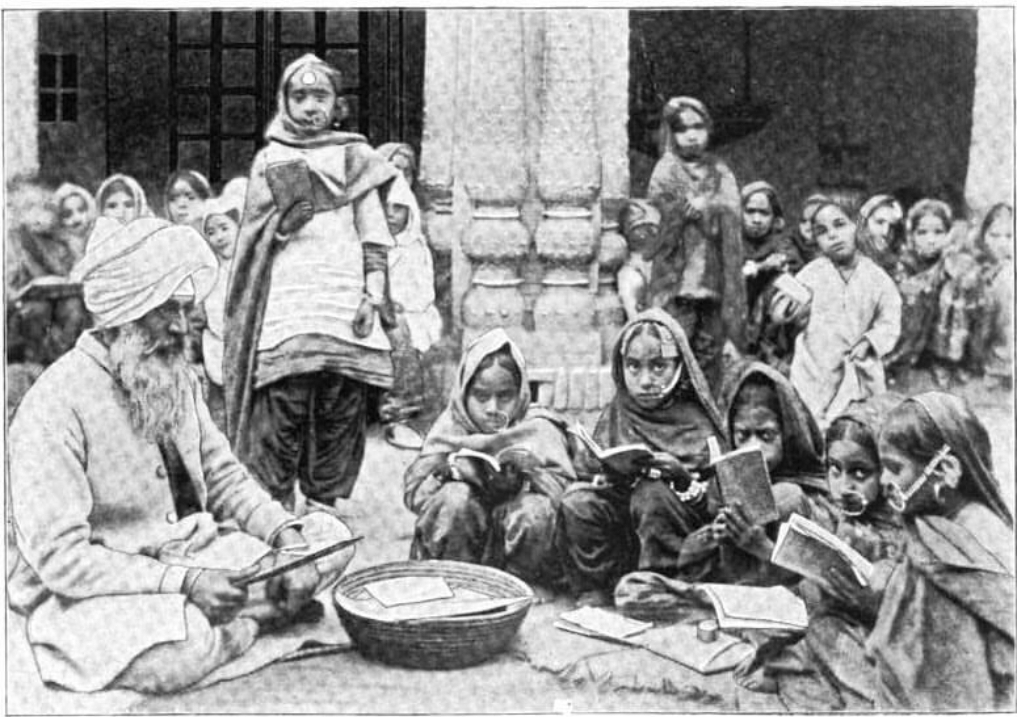
Sikh girls school in Rawalpindi, circa 1920s (estimate)

According to the 1941 census, the Sikh population in West Punjab (the region that composes contemporary Punjab, Pakistan) was approximately 1,520,112, or 8.77 percent of the total population. At the district level in the West Punjab region, the largest Sikh concentrations existed in Sheikhupura District (Sikhs formed 18.85 percent of the total population and numbered 160,706 persons), Lyallpur District (18.82 percent or 262,737 persons), Lahore District (18.32 percent or 310,646 persons), Montgomery District (13.17 percent or 175,064 persons), and Sialkot District (11.71 percent or 139,409 persons).

Sikhs in the administrative divisions that compose the contemporary Punjab, Pakistan region (1881–1941)
District or Princely State	1881		1901		1911		1921		1931		1941	
District or Princely State	Pop.	%	Pop.	%	Pop.	%	Pop.	%	Pop.	%	Pop.	%
Lahore District	125,591	13.59%	159,701	13.74%	169,008	16.31%	179,975	15.91%	244,304	17.72%	310,646	18.32%
Sialkot District	40,195	3.97%	50,982	4.7%	81,761	8.35%	74,939	7.99%	94,955	9.69%	139,409	11.71%
Gujranwala District	36,159	5.86%	51,607	6.82%	107,748	11.67%	50,802	8.15%	71,595	9.73%	99,139	10.87%
Rawalpindi District	17,780	2.17%	32,234	3.46%	31,839	5.81%	31,718	5.57%	41,265	6.51%	64,127	8.17%
Montgomery District	11,964	2.8%	19,092	4.12%	68,175	12.74%	95,520	13.38%	148,155	14.82%	175,064	13.17%
Jhelum District	11,188	1.9%	15,070	2.54%	24,436	4.78%	18,626	3.9%	22,030	4.07%	24,680	3.92%
Gujrat District	8,885	1.29%	24,893	3.32%	44,693	5.99%	49,456	6%	59,188	6.42%	70,233	6.36%
Shakargarh Tehsil (Note: Part of Gurdaspur District which was awarded to Pakistan as part of the Radcliffe Line.)	5,090	2.32%	6,557	2.8%	10,553	5.01%	12,303	5.78%	15,730	6.36%	20,573	7.06%
Shahpur District	4,702	1.12%	12,756	2.43%	33,456	4.87%	30,361	4.22%	40,074	4.88%	48,046	4.81%
Jhang District	3,477	0.88%	3,526	0.93%	19,427	3.77%	9,376	1.64%	8,476	1.27%	12,238	1.49%
Muzaffargarh District	2,788	0.82%	3,225	0.8%	6,322	1.11%	4,869	0.86%	5,287	0.89%	5,882	0.83%
Multan District	2,085	0.38%	4,662	0.66%	19,881	2.44%	18,562	2.08%	39,453	3.36%	61,628	4.15%
Bahawalpur State	1,678	0.29%	7,985	1.11%	16,630	2.13%	19,071	2.44%	34,896	3.54%	46,945	3.5%
Dera Ghazi Khan District	1,326	0.36%	1,027	0.22%	1,042	0.21%	932	0.2%	760	0.15%	1,072	0.18%
Lyallpur District (Note: District formerly inscribed as the Chenab Colony on the 1901 census, later renamed to Lyallpur District, created between Jhang District, Gujranwala District, Lahore District, Montgomery District, and Multan District to account for the large population increase in the region, primarily due to the Chenab Canal Colony.)	—N/a	—N/a	88,049	11.12%	146,670	17.1%	160,821	16.42%	211,391	18.36%	262,737	18.82%
Mianwali District	—N/a	—N/a	2,633	0.62%	4,881	1.43%	2,986	0.83%	4,231	1.03%	6,865	1.36%
Biloch Trans–Frontier Tract	—N/a	—N/a	0	0%	5	0.02%	0	0%	0	0%	2	0.005%
Attock District (Note: District created in 1904 by taking Talagang Tehsil from Jhelum District and Pindi Gheb, Fateh Jang and Attock Tehsils from Rawalpindi District.)	—N/a	—N/a	—N/a	—N/a	26,914	5.18%	19,809	3.87%	19,522	3.34%	20,120	2.98%
Sheikhupura District (Note: District created between Gujranwala District, Sialkot District, Amritsar District, Lahore District, Montgomery District, and Lyallpur District in 1920 to account for the large population increase in the region, primarily due to the Chenab Canal Colony.)	—N/a	—N/a	—N/a	—N/a	—N/a	—N/a	82,965	15.86%	119,477	17.15%	160,706	18.85%
Total Sikhs	272,908	3.44%	483,999	4.64%	813,441	7.33%	863,091	7.26%	1,180,789	8.41%	1,530,112	8.82%
Total Population	7,942,399	100%	10,427,765	100%	11,104,585	100%	11,888,985	100%	14,040,798	100%	17,350,103	100%
Note: 186 villages and 2 towns — Khemkaran and Patti of Kasur Tehsil (Lahore District) fell on the eastern Punjab (Indian) side with the Radcliffe Line, but their population numbers are still included here as detailed sub-tehsil religious data did not exist at the time. According to the 1941 census, Kasur Tehsil had a total of 322 villages and 3 towns, roughly half fell on the western Punjab (Pakistani) side of the Radcliffe Line.

=== Khyber Pakhtunkhwa ===
Sikh Population History Khyber Pakhtunkhwa
Year	Pop.	±% p.a.
1901	25,733	—
1911	30,345	+1.66%
1921	28,040	−0.79%
1931	42,510	+4.25%
1941	57,939	+3.14%
1951	215	−42.86%
1981	729	+4.15%
2023	4,050	+4.17%
Source: Census of India, Census of Pakistan

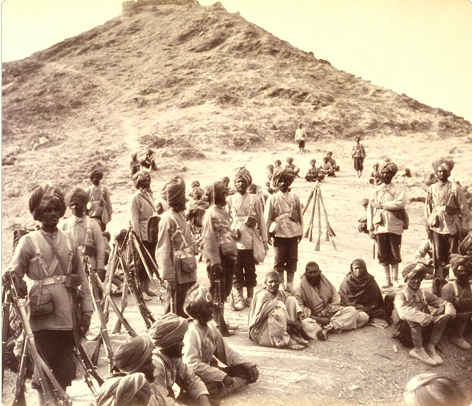
45th Sikh Regiment escorting Afghan prisoners through the Khyber Pass during the Second Anglo-Afghan War (1878)

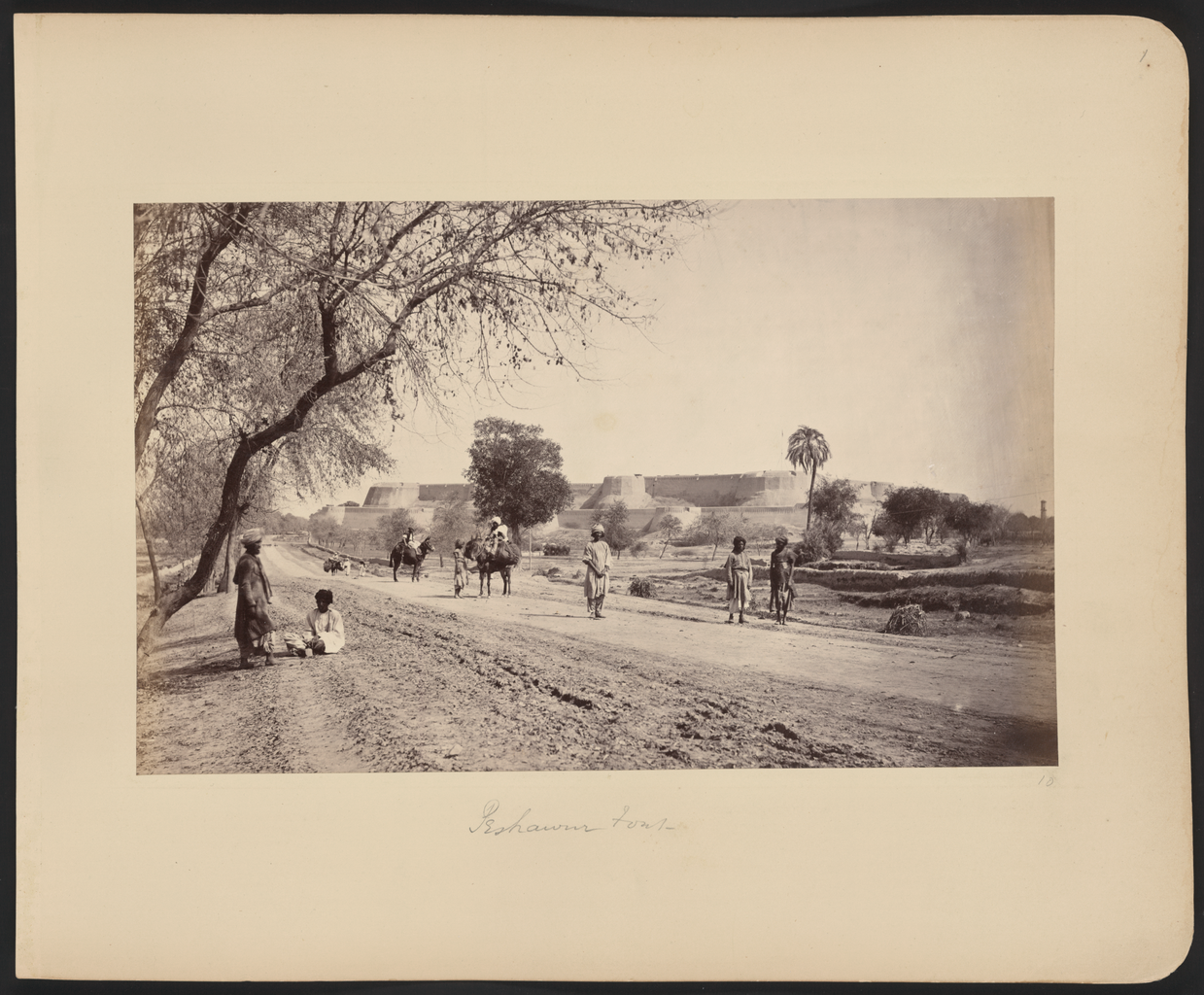
Sikhs at the Peshawar Fort (1879–1880)

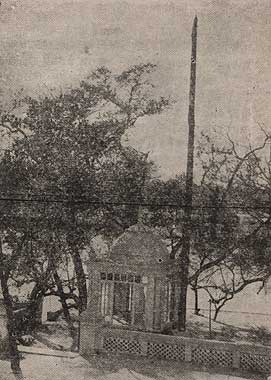
Akali Phula Singh Memorial in Nowshera (Late 19th or early 20th century)

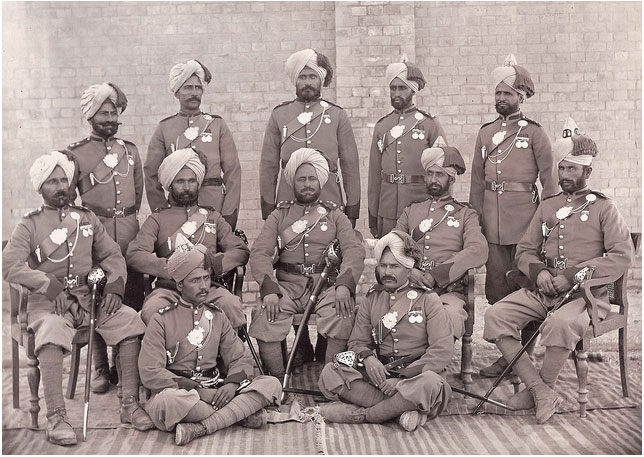
52nd Sikh Regiment in Kohat, North-West Frontier Province (1905)

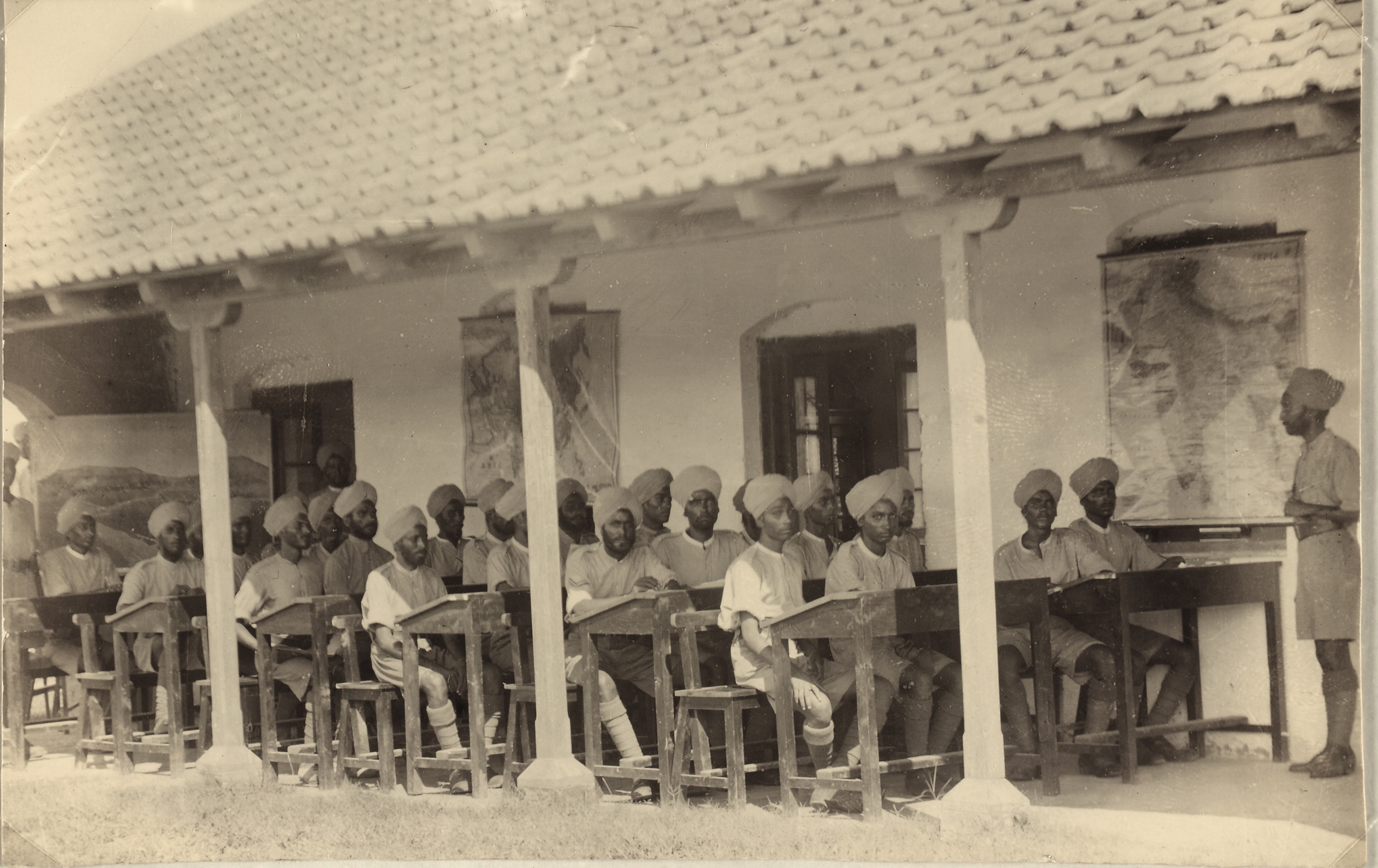
Sikh recruits at school in North-West Frontier Province (1933–1935)

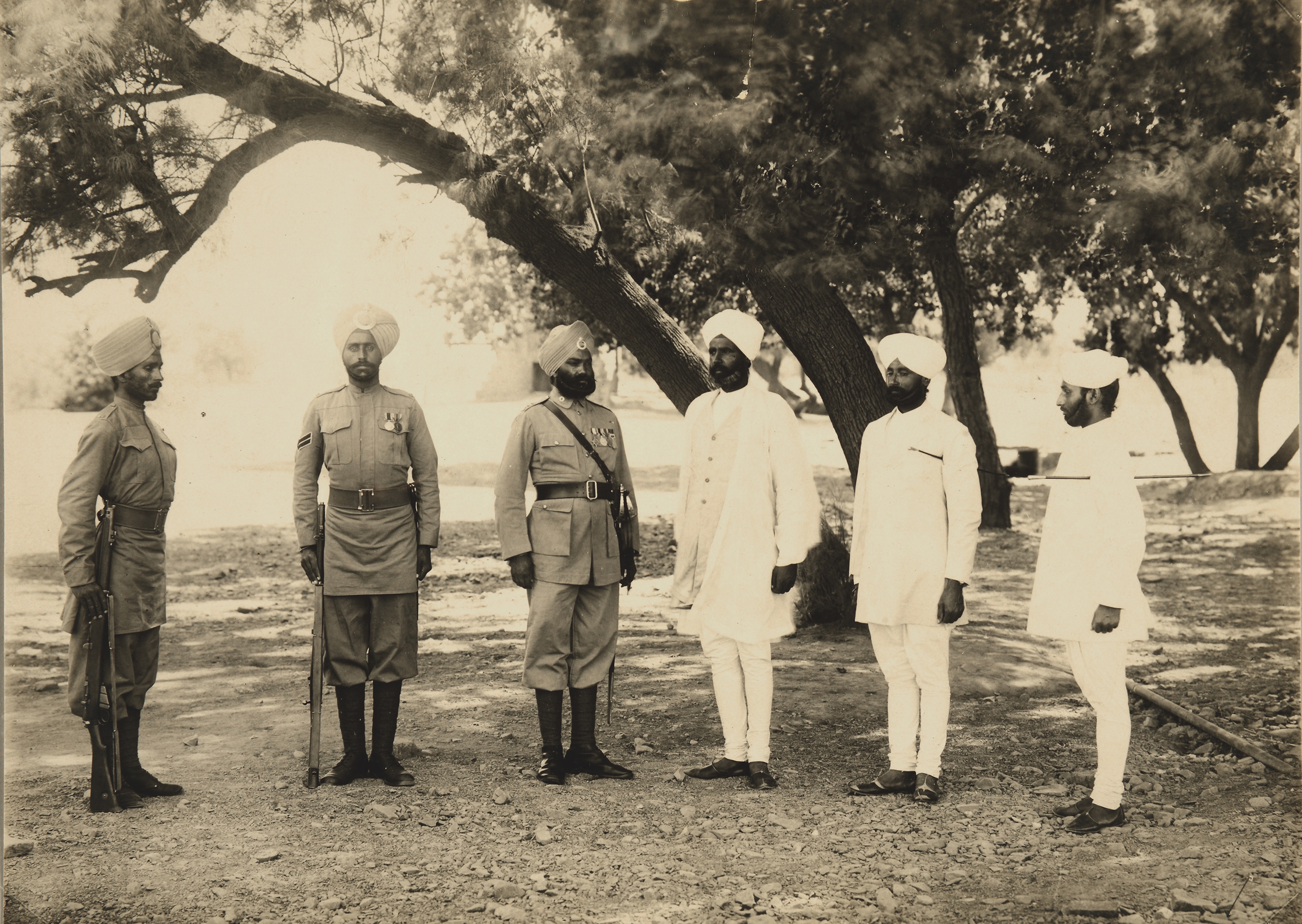
Sikh sepoys, non-commissioned and Indian Officers in uniform and mufti in North-West Frontier Province (1933–1935)

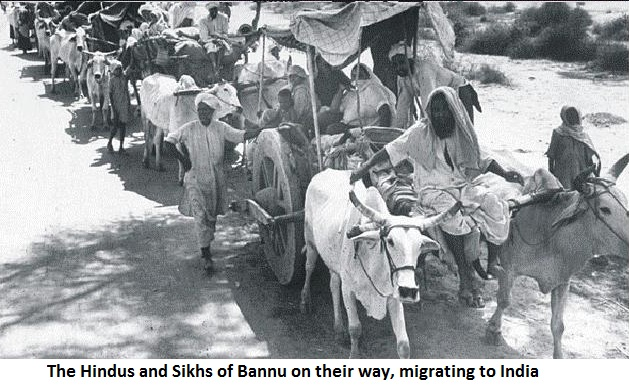
Sikhs and Hindus of Bannu migrating to India during the partition of 1947.

During the colonial era (British India), prior to the partition in 1947, decadal censuses enumerated religion in North-West Frontier Province, and not in the Federally Administered Tribal Areas. Both administrative divisions later amalgamated to become Khyber Pakhtunkhwa.

According to the 1941 census, the Sikh population in North-West Frontier Province (part of the region that composes contemporary Khyber Pakhtunkhwa) was approximately 57,939, or 1.9 percent of the total population. At the district level in North-West Frontier Province, the largest Sikh concentrations existed in Peshawar District (Sikhs formed 2.82 percent of the total population and numbered 24,030 persons), Mardan District (2.34 percent or 11,838 persons), and Bannu District (2.07 percent or 6,112 persons).

Sikhs in the districts of North–West Frontier Province (1921–1941)
District	1921		1931		1941	
District	Pop.	%	Pop.	%	Pop.	%
Peshawar District	15,326	1.69%	24,271	2.49%	24,030	2.82%
Hazara District	4,850	0.78%	7,630	1.14%	9,220	1.16%
Bannu District	3,286	1.33%	5,482	2.03%	6,112	2.07%
Kohat District	2,674	1.25%	3,249	1.38%	4,349	1.5%
Dera Ismail Khan District	1,904	0.73%	1,878	0.69%	2,390	0.8%
Mardan District	—N/a	—N/a	—N/a	—N/a	11,838	2.34%
Total Sikhs	28,040	1.25%	42,510	1.75%	57,939	1.91%
Total Population	2,251,340	100%	2,425,076	100%	3,038,067	100%

At the tehsil level in North-West Frontier Province, as per the 1941 census, the largest Sikh concentrations existed in Peshawar Tehsil (Sikhs formed 3.97 percent of the total population and numbered 15,454 persons), Kohat Tehsil (3.15 percent or 3,613 persons), Nowshera Tehsil (3.04 percent or 6,636 persons), Mardan Tehsil (3.04 percent or 9,091 persons), and Bannu Tehsil (2.82 percent or 5,285 persons).

Sikhs in the tehsils of North–West Frontier Province (1921–1941)
Tehsil	1921		1931		1941	
Tehsil	Pop.	%	Pop.	%	Pop.	%
Peshawar Tehsil	8,223	3.12%	9,736	3.49%	15,454	3.97%
Abbottabad Tehsil	3,344	1.44%	4,599	1.81%	6,035	1.96%
Mardan Tehsil	2,874	1.67%	5,174	2.61%	9,091	3.04%
Bannu Tehsil	2,777	1.95%	4,979	3.08%	5,285	2.82%
Nowshera Tehsil	2,380	1.6%	4,678	2.91%	6,636	3.04%
Kohat Tehsil	2,195	2.84%	2,184	2.47%	3,613	3.15%
Swabi Tehsil	1,062	0.67%	3,030	1.91%	2,747	1.33%
Haripur Tehsil	968	0.6%	2,019	1.19%	2,011	1.07%
Dera Ismail Khan Tehsil	884	0.57%	894	0.52%	1,740	0.93%
Tank Tehsil	811	1.36%	574	1.12%	401	0.72%
Charsadda Tehsil	787	0.48%	1,653	0.93%	1,940	0.79%
Marwat Tehsil	509	0.49%	503	0.46%	817	0.75%
Mansehra Tehsil	468	0.23%	966	0.46%	965	0.4%
Hangu Tehsil	434	0.97%	1,038	2.31%	650	1.05%
Kulachi Tehsil	209	0.46%	410	0.79%	249	0.45%
Amb Tehsil	70	0.32%	45	0.14%	195	0.41%
Teri Tehsil	45	0.05%	27	0.03%	86	0.08%
Phulra Tehsil	0	0%	1	0.02%	14	0.16%
Total Sikhs	28,040	1.25%	42,510	1.75%	57,929	1.91%
Total Population	2,251,340	100%	2,425,076	100%	3,038,067	100%

According to the 1941 census, the Sikh population in urban portions of North-West Frontier Province was approximately 41,399, or 7.5 percent of the total urban population. Cities/urban areas in North-West Frontier Province with the largest Sikh concentrations included Mardan (Sikhs formed 14.15 percent of the total population and numbered 6,014 persons), Bannu (12.71 percent or 4,894 persons), Risalpur (11.37 percent or 1,024 persons), Haripur (11.1 percent or 1,035 persons), and Abbottabad (9.77 percent or 2,680 persons).

Sikhs in the cities of North-West Frontier Province (1921–1941)
City/Urban Area	1921		1931		1941	
City/Urban Area	Pop.	%	Pop.	%	Pop.	%
Peshawar (Note: Includes total Municipality and Cantonment population.)	6,152	5.89%	8,630	7.08%	14,245	8.21%
Bannu	2,421	10.88%	3,947	12.92%	4,894	12.71%
Kohat	2,139	7.68%	2,152	6.26%	3,562	7.92%
Mardan	1,679	15.36%	2,927	11.14%	6,014	14.15%
Nowshera (Note: Includes total Cantonment and Notified area population.)	1,319	4.75%	3,042	10.5%	4,253	9.66%
Jamrud	1,254	20.46%	—N/a	—N/a	—N/a	—N/a
Abbottabad	879	6.45%	1,039	6.43%	2,680	9.77%
Dera Ismail Khan	724	1.84%	708	1.76%	1,412	2.75%
Risalpur	601	7.07%	314	3.92%	1,024	11.37%
Lakki (Note: Includes total Notified area population.)	470	6.29%	268	3.48%	548	5.4%
Haripur	346	5.88%	696	9.09%	1,035	11.1%
Tank	344	3.17%	240	3.74%	181	1.99%
Nawan Shehr	246	4.83%	363	7.08%	309	4.82%
Kulachi	84	1.06%	128	1.52%	138	1.56%
Baffa	39	0.51%	86	1.19%	81	1.01%
Charsadda	30	0.29%	287	2.49%	294	1.75%
Cherat	8	3.07%	74	8.78%	25	7.42%
Tangi	1	0.01%	7	0.08%	2	0.02%
Parang	1	0.01%	0	0%	0	0%
Mansehra	—N/a	—N/a	469	8.11%	375	3.67%
Utmanzai	—N/a	—N/a	—N/a	—N/a	171	1.69%
Kot Najibullah	—N/a	—N/a	—N/a	—N/a	156	2.94%
Total Urban Sikh Population	18,737	5.58%	25,377	6.57%	41,399	7.5%
Total Urban Population	335,849	100%	386,177	100%	552,193	100%

=== Balochistan ===
According to the 1941 census, the Sikh population in Baluchistan Agency (the region that composes contemporary Balochistan, Pakistan) was approximately 12,044, or 1.4 percent of the total population. At the district/princely state level in Baluchistan Agency, the largest Sikh concentrations existed in Quetta–Pishin District (Sikhs formed 5.62 percent of the total population and numbered 8,787 persons), Bolan District (3.06 percent or 184 persons), Zhob District (1.75 percent or 1,076 persons), Loralai District (1.34 percent or 1,124 persons), and Chaghai District (0.6 percent or 181 persons).

Sikhs in the districts and princely states of Baluchistan Agency (1941)
District/ Princely State	Sikhism	
District/ Princely State	Population	Percentage
Quetta–Pishin District	8,787	5.62%
Loralai District	1,124	1.34%
Zhob District	1,076	1.75%
Sibi District	566	0.34%
Bolan District	184	3.06%
Chaghai District	181	0.6%
Kalat State	79	0.03%
Las Bela State	47	0.07%
Kharan State	0	0%
Total Sikhs	12,044	1.4%
Total Population	857,835	100%

According to the 1941 census, the Sikh population in urban portions of Baluchistan Agency was approximately 11,041, or 9.7 percent of the total urban population. Cities/urban areas in Baluchistan Agency with the largest Sikh concentrations included Loralai (Sikhs formed 21.9 percent of the total population and numbered 1,116 persons), Quetta (11.42 percent or 7,364 persons), Fort Sandeman (10.73 percent or 1,004 persons), Chaman (10.48 percent or 697 persons), and Pishin (9.68 percent or 183 persons).

Sikhs in the cities of Baluchistan Agency (1941)
City/Urban Area	Sikhism	
City/Urban Area	Population	Percentage
Quetta (Note: Includes town and cantonment)	7,364	11.42%
Loralai	1,116	21.9%
Fort Sandeman	1,004	10.73%
Chaman	697	10.48%
Sibi	362	4.09%
Pishin	183	9.68%
Machh	121	5.45%
Usta	77	4%
Bela	47	1.2%
Kalat	33	1.34%
Mastung	28	0.89%
Panjgur	9	1.9%
Pasni	0	0%
Total Urban Sikh Population	11,041	9.68%
Total Urban population	114,060	100%

== Religious persecution ==
The Pakistani Taliban has assassinated and forcefully converted Sikhs in the tribal areas and Peshawar. Sikhs, and other non-Muslim Pakistanis, grapple with significant challenges of persecution and religious discrimination in Khyber Pakhtunkhwa. In response to alleged death threats by the Taliban, numerous Sikh families have sought refuge in other nations to secure their well-being.

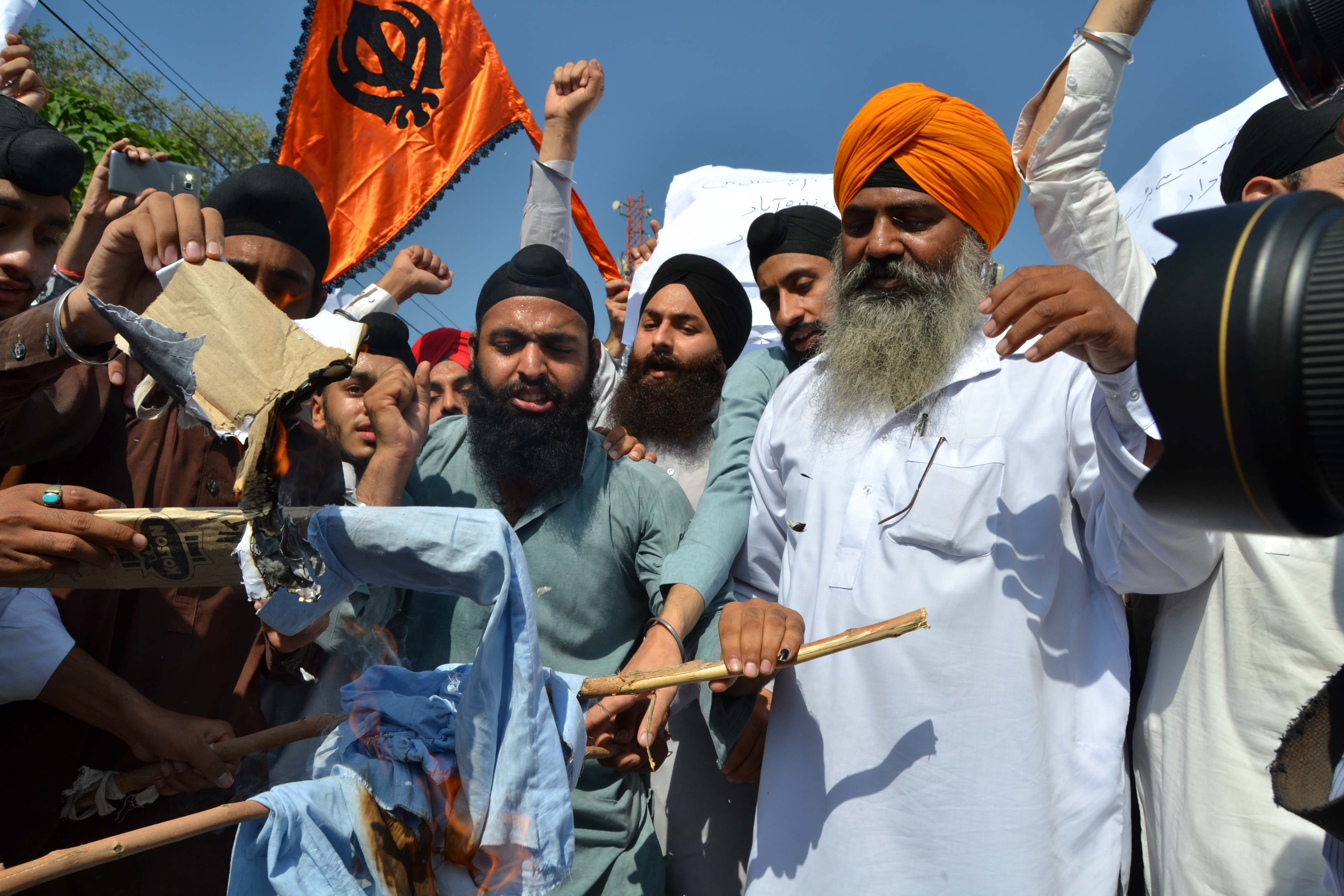
The Sikh community protested in Pakistan for their absence in census of 2017.

In 2009, the Lashkar-e-Islam, led by Mangal Bagh, demanded that Sikhs in the Aurakzai tribal region in Federally Administered Tribal Areas pay them the jizya (poll tax levied by Muslims on non-Muslim minorities). Initially demanding 50 million rupees as the jizya payment, the Taliban later settled for a 20 million rupee payment, which local Sikhs paid. After paying the jizya, the Taliban assured protection for Sikhs, causing some Sikhs who had fled to return. In 2010, the Taliban attacked many religious minorities including Sikhs.

On 22 February 2010, three Sikh men were beheaded by the Pakistani Taliban group demanded Rs. 30 million for the release of the abducted Sikhs; after their relatives failed to pay, two of the kidnapped were beheaded. Two Sikhs, Sukhjeet Singh and Gurvinder Singh, were later rescued by Pakistani security forces. The event may have affected scheduled talks between India and Pakistan.

On June 18, 2026, an elderly Sikh couple was fatally shot by unidentified assailants at a gurdwara in Babu Mohalla, Khyber Pakhtunkhwa. Jagannath, a 70-year-old, and his wife Wanti were the caretakers of the gurdwara. The incident drew sharp reactions from Akal Takht calling it a "grave act of oppression, and Bharatiya Janata Party who expressed concerns regarding safety of religious minorities in Pakistan and linked the incident to the Citizenship Amendment Act.

== Pakistani Sikh diaspora ==
Many Pakistani Sikhs have emigrated to countries like the United Kingdom (UK), Canada and Thailand. According to the UK's 2001 census, there were 346 Pakistani Sikhs in the UK. There is also a growing Pakistani Sikh expatriate community in the United Arab Emirates.

== Notable Pakistani Sikhs ==
- Soran Singh, former member of Khyber Pakhtunkhwa provincial assembly
- Ranjeet Singh, former member of Khyber Pakhtunkhwa provincial assembly
- Mahindar Pall Singh, former member of Punjab provincial assembly
- Gurdeep Singh, current Senator
- Ramesh Singh, current member of the Punjab provincial assembly
- Gurpal Singh, current member of Khyber Pakhtunkhwa provincial assembly
- Hercharn Singh, soldier
- Rup Magon, musician
- Jassi Lailpuria, singer
- Manmeet Kaur, journalist
- Mahindarpal Singh, cricketer

== Gurdwaras in Pakistan ==
After the partition of British India, gurdwaras fell into disuse as Sikhs fled to India, leaving their ancestral homelands. Later, cross-border agreements allowed for Indian Sikh yatri pilgrims to visit Pakistani gurdwaras during religious festivals. After insurgency erupted in the Indian state of Punjab, the Pakistani government became more lenient when allowing Sikh pilgrims into the country.

Mohammad Waliullah Khan in his 1962 book Sikh Shrines in West Pakistan recorded 130 historical shrines associated with Sikhism in West Pakistan, listing all of their names and location. In 1998, Iqbal Qaiser recorded nearly 200 historical Sikh shrines in Pakistan in his book Historical Sikh Shrines in Pakistan after five years of research. Amardeep Singh Ranghar had documented the Sikh sites in Pakistan in two volumes during the 2010s under the title of Lost Heritage: The Sikh Legacy in Pakistan. In his 2019 book The Sikh Heritage: Beyond Borders, Dalvir Singh Pannu documents around eight-four Sikh sites in the country. In a 2024 statement, Pakistani Sikh official Ramesh Singh Arora claimed there was over 200 Sikh sites in the country and over 100 Sikh gurdwaras were located in Nankana Saheb, Lahore, Kasur, and Narowal districts.I n 2025, Gurmail Singh wrote that there were 151 Sikh gurdwaras remaining in Pakistan, with 126 in Punjab, 10 in Sindh, 2 in Balochistan, 12 in Khyber Pakhtunkhwa, and 1 in Azad Jammu and Kashmir. In April 2025, the organization Jeevay Sanjha Punjab published a work documenting forty-two Sikh sites in Lahore district, with the organization claiming over 200 historical Sikh sites remain in Pakistan, mostly in Punjab. The website Gurudwarapedia.com has been documenting forgotten gurdwaras in Pakistan through the use of geo-tagging.

=== Operational gurdwaras ===
In 2012, 16 gurdwaras were open to Sikhs for worship out of around 175 gurdwaras in the country. That year in November, the gurdwaras Gurdwara Janamsthan Bebe Nanaki at Dera Chahal in Lahore, Gurdwara Babe Di Ber in Sialkot, Gurdwara Bhai Joga Singh and Gurdwara Bhai Biba Singh, both in Peshawar, were restored to their original function and began accepting Sikh pilgrims. In 2024, the Pakistan Sikh Gurdwara Parbandhak Committee listed twenty-one operational gurdwaras on its website. Many of the gurdwaras are located in Nankana Sahib. Operational gurdwaras are as follows:

- Gurdwara Darbar Sahib Kartarpur, Kartarpur
- Gurdwara Babe-di-Beri, Sialkot
- Gurdwara Panja Sahib, Hasan Abdal
- Gurdwara Rori Sahib, Eminabad, Eminabad
- Gurdwara Janam Asthan, Nankana Sahib
- Gurdwara Dera Sahib, Lahore
- Gurdwara Janam Asthan Guru Ram Das, Lahore
- Gurdwara Bhai Biba Singh, Peshawar
- Gurdwara Bhai Joga Singh, Peshawar
- Gurdwara Tambu Sahib, Nankana Sahib
- Gurdwara Patti Sahib, Nankana Sahib
- Gurdwara Bal Lila Sahib, Nankana Sahib
- Gurdwara Kiara Sahib, Nankana Sahib
- Gurdwara Panjvin, Nankana Sahib
- Gurdwara Chhevin Patshahi, Nankana Sahib
- Gurdwara Singh Sabha, Mingora
- Gurdwara Sach Khand Sahib, Shikarpur
- Gurdwara Ganj Singh, Lahore
- Gurdwara Babay Nanki, Dera Chahal
- Gurdwara Malji Sahib, Kasur District
- Gurdwara Sacha Sauda, Farooqabad
- Gurdwara Khara Sahib, Mattu Bhaike
- Gurdwara Shaheedganj Singh Singhania
- Gurdwara Hargobind Sahib
- Gurdwara Mula Khatri

=== Defunct and lost gurdwaras ===
Some sites that once existed as gurdwaras have since been abandoned, lost or destroyed. In August 2024, it was reported that the Jeevay Sanjha Punjab (JSP) rediscovered some historical Sikh gurdwaras, samadhs (cenotaphs), and janam-asthans (birthplace-locations) in Lahore, such as the birthplace of Bhai Daya Singh, the samadh of Maharani Jind Kaur, and Gurdwara Baoli Sahib constructed by Guru Arjan.

- Gurdwara Rori Sahib, Jahman
- Gurdwara Shaheed Bhai Taru Singh, Lahore
- Gurdwara Chowa Sahib, Jhelum
- Gurdwara Ratan Talao, Karachi
- Gurdwara Shahid Ganj Singh Singhania, Lahore
- Gurdwara Makhdoom Pur Pahoran, Makhdoom Pur Pahoran
- Gurdwara Baoli Sahib, Lahore
- Gurdwara Chhevin Patshahi, Hadiara
- Gurdwara Jhari Sahib, Tergay
- Gurdwara Kair Sahib, Jaisak

== Gallery ==
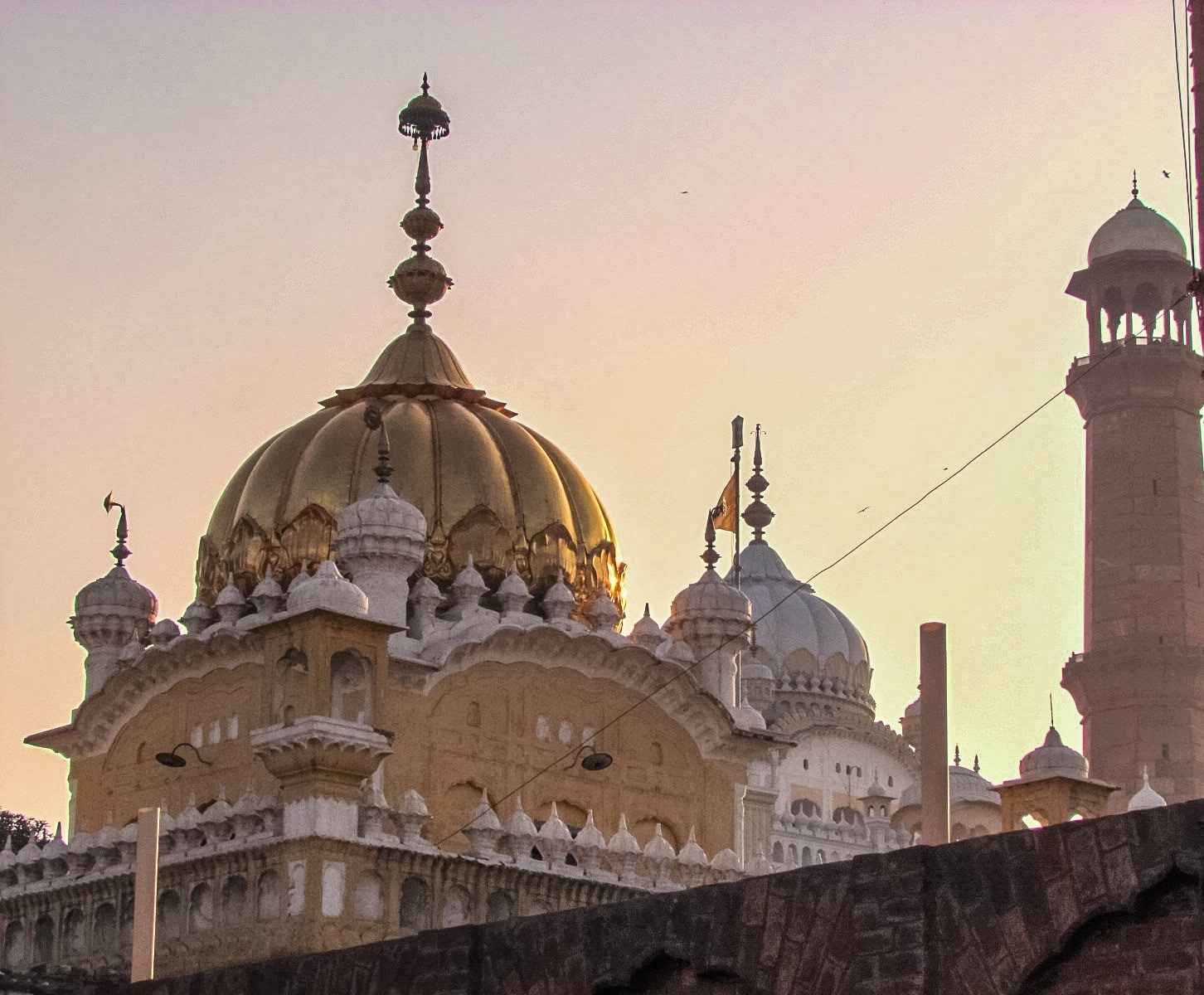
Golden dome of Gurdwara Dera Sahib in Lahore

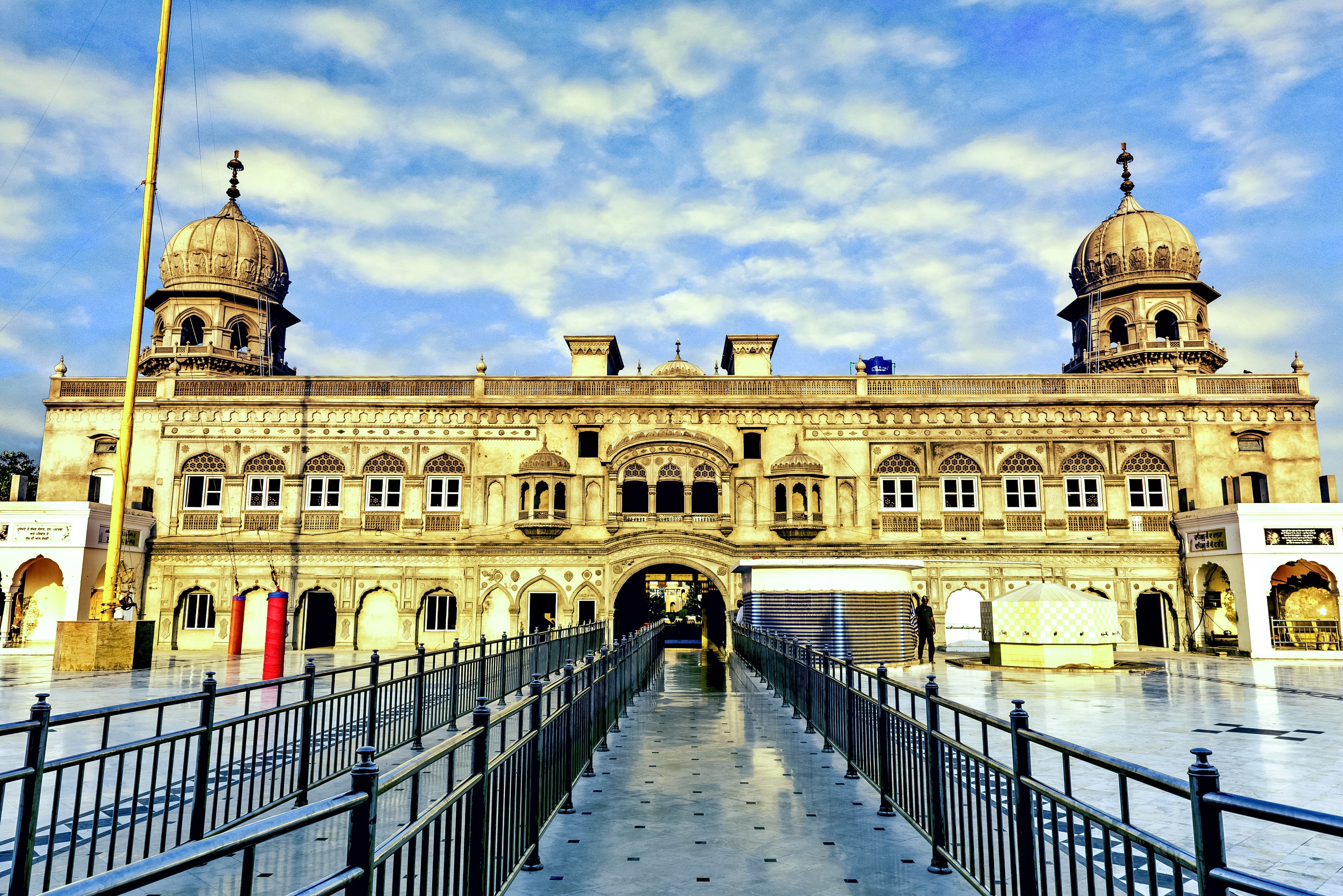
The Gurdwara Janam Asthan in Nankana Sahib, Pakistan, commemorates the site where Guru Nanak is believed to have been born. It was rebuilt by the Pakistani Government

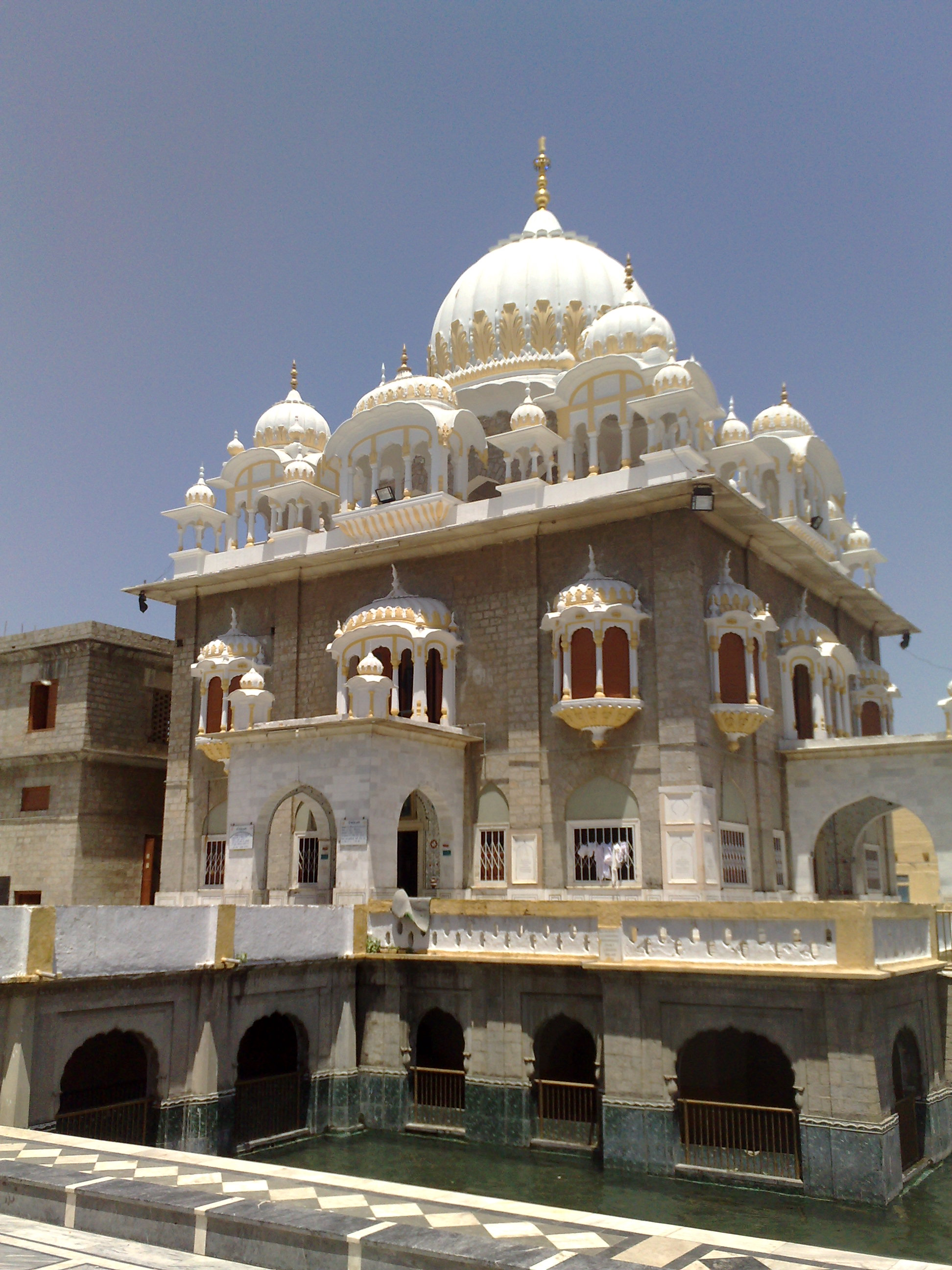
Gurdwara Panja Sahib in Punjab

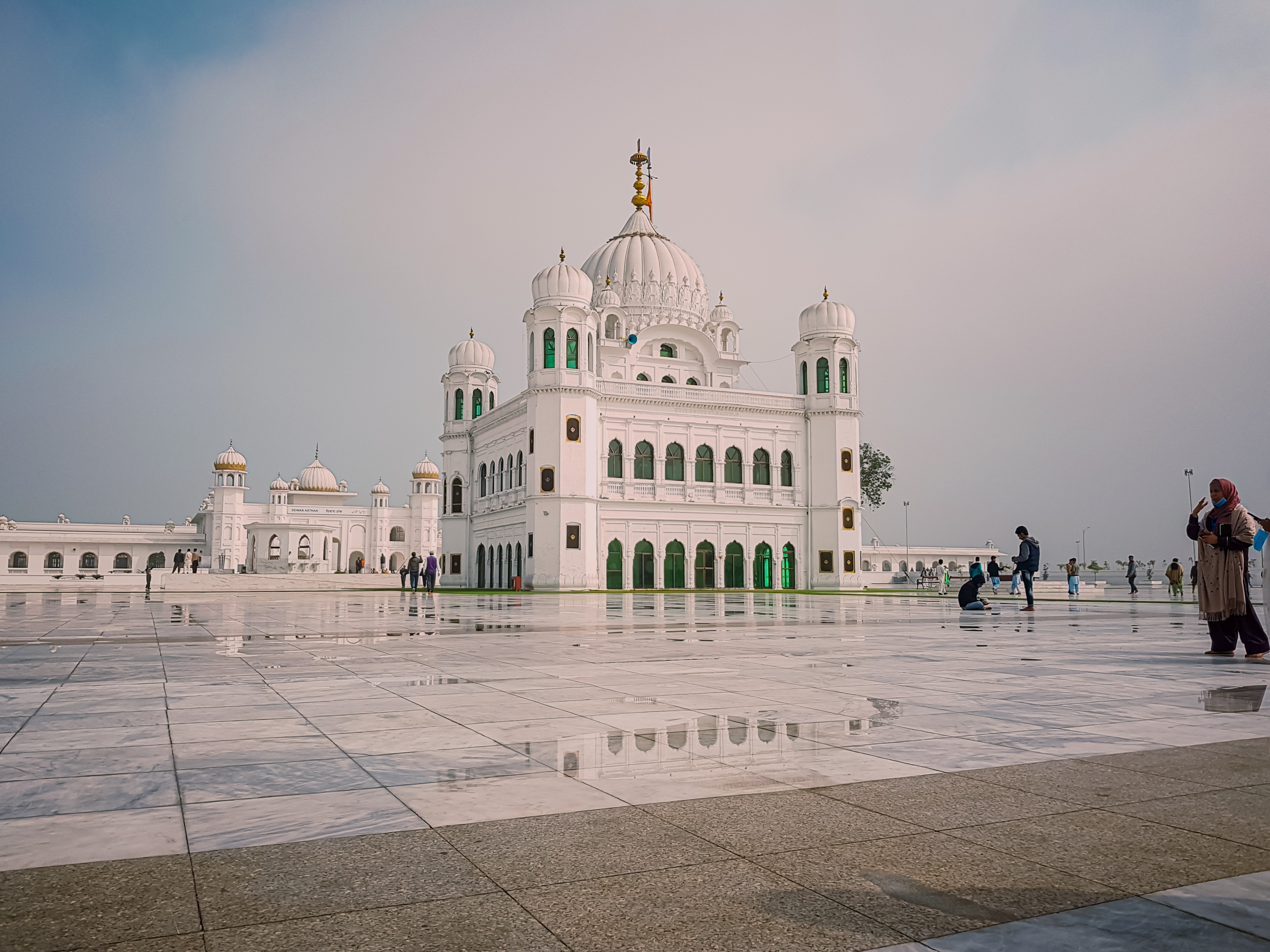
Darbar Sahib, gurdwara commemorating Guru Nanak, in Kartarpur, Pakistan

== See also ==
- Pakistan Sikh Council
- Pakistan Sikh Gurdwara Prabandhak Committee
- 2010 Sikh beheadings by the Taliban
- History of Sikhism
- Nanak Wara
