= Punjabi Sikh Sangat =

Pakistani Sikh organisation

- Headquarters: 25 Nisbaat Road, Lahore, Punjab, Pakistan
- Location: Pakistan
- Chairman: Gopal Singh Chawla
- Website: punjabisikhsangat.org

Punjabi Sikh Sangat (PSS) was a Pakistani Sikh organization that was formed to manage Sikh shrines in Punjab, Pakistan. The organization had three offices, in Lahore, Nankana Sahib, and Panja Sahib. It was headed by Gopal Singh Chawla as chairman or president. Its leader was an advocate of the Khalistan movement, was pro-Pakistan, and was an outspoken critic of India.

== History ==
In June 2014, the organization held a protest, attended by Sikhs from Nankana Sahib, Narowal, Peshawar, and Sindh, regarding the 1984 Operation Blue Star attack on the Golden Temple complex in Amritsar. In October 2018, its leader admitted to having knowledge of the killings of RSS leaders in Punjab, India. In 2019, Chawla was removed as secretary from the Pakistan Sikh Gurdwara Parbandhak Committee due to Indian pressure, but he remained on the board panel. In 2020, Chawla was honoured by the Pakistan Sikh Gurdwara Parbandhak Committee (PSGPC) and its parent body Evacuee Trust Property Board (ETPB). In 2021, Chawla blamed India's Research and Analysis Wing for a desecration occurring at the Sidhi Vinayak temple in Bhong city in Rahim Yar Khan district. He also blamed RAW for anti-Sikh killings and attacks in KPK and Nankana Sahib. Chawla was later removed due to allegations of corruption by illegally occupying land in Nankana Sahib. However, Chawla alleges that revenue official Asif Chadar colluded with officials of the Evacuee Trust Property Board to sell land belonging to Nankana Sahib illegally. Chawla uploaded a video criticizing authorities but later apologized for his statements. Chawla has been under house-arrest for three years as of December 2025 which the Pakistani authorities claim is for his safety due to threats from India. India claims Chawla was a Khalistani ISI asset who had ties with Hafiz Sayeed, Chawla had said that Sayeed was his "ideal person". As per Yudhvir Rana, Chawla was sidelined due to the opening of the Kartarpur corridor, where India requested that controversial elements be removed as a condition for the project to open.

== Board of directors ==
Its board of directors was as follows:

- Tariq Wazir Khan, Secretory Shrines ETPB, patron-in-chief
- Gopal Singh Chawala, chairman
- Partap Singh, administrator for Peshawar, Khyber Pakhtunkhwa
- Ramesh Singh Arora, ex. general secretary of the PSGPC
