= Baba Gurpal Singh =

Pakistani politician and activist

Baba Gurpal Singh (born 17 June 1993) is a Pakistani politician and social activist who has been serving as a member of the Khyber Pakhtunkhwa assembly since 20 July 2025. He is the first member of the Pakistani Sikh community to be elected to the provincial assembly of Khyber Pakhtunkhwa.

Gurpal Singh is the son of Baba Sujan Singh, and belongs to a Sikh family hailing from Bara, Khyber District, which was forced to relocate to mohalla Jugan Shah in Peshawar after the 2008–09 surge in militancy. He contested on the ticket of Jamiat Ulema-e-Islam (F) on the minority seat in the 2024 Pakistani general election and was elected unopposed. He is also the representative of the Sikh community belonging to the merged tribal areas.

== See also ==
- Ramesh Singh Arora
- Gurdeep Singh
