= Punjab Anand Karaj Bill, 2017 =

Bill legalising Sikh marriages in Punjab, Pakistan

Punjab Anand Karaj Bill 2017

Provincial Assembly of the Punjab
- Long title: An act to legalise the status of Sikh marriages in the Punjab province
- Citation: Bill 2017
- Enacted by: Provincial Assembly of the Punjab
- Introduced by: Ramesh Singh Arora
- Status: In force

The Punjab Anand Karaj Bill 2017 is a bill legalising the status of Sikh marriages in the Pakistani province. It was unanimously passed by the Provincial Assembly of the Punjab in 2018, and the act was approved by the government in 2024. The bill was introduced by Ramesh Singh Arora in 2017.

The act allows for Sikhs aged 18 to register their marriages and divorces with the government. Before the act was approved, Sikh marriages were registered with gurudwaras.

Pakistan declared that it would pass the Sikh Anand Marriage Act in 2007 and a draft was prepared.
