= Pakistan Sikh Council =

- ਪਾਕਿਸਤਾਨ ਸਿੱਖ ਕੌਂਸਲ پاکستان سکھ کونسل
- Abbreviation: PSC
- Type: Religious organization
- Region served: Pakistan
- Website: http://pakistansikhcouncil.org/

The Pakistan Sikh Council (PSC) (Gurmukhi: ਪਾਕਿਸਤਾਨ ਸਿੱਖ ਕੌਂਸਲ; Shahmukhi: پاکستان سکھ کونسل) is a Sikh organisation in Pakistan which works for rights of the Sikh community in Pakistan. In organisation Sardar Ramesh Singh Khalsa is Patron-in-Chief, Sardar Tara Singh is president, Arshad Jee Singh is vice president and Karan Singh Rai is General Secretary. It is based in Karachi.

== See also ==
- Sardar Ramesh Singh
- Sikhism in Pakistan
- Pakistan Sikh Gurdwara Prabandhak Committee
