= Iqbal Qaiser =

Iqbal Qaiser is Pakistani Punjabi writer, historian and cultural activist. He is founder of Punjabi Khoj Garh, Mustafa Abad, Kasur. He is a Punjabi nationalist and researcher of Sikh and Hindu heritage in Pakistan.
