= Gurdwara Khara Sahib =

Sikh temple in Mattoo Bhaie Key, Pakistan

Coordinates: 31°58′52″N 73°59′31″E

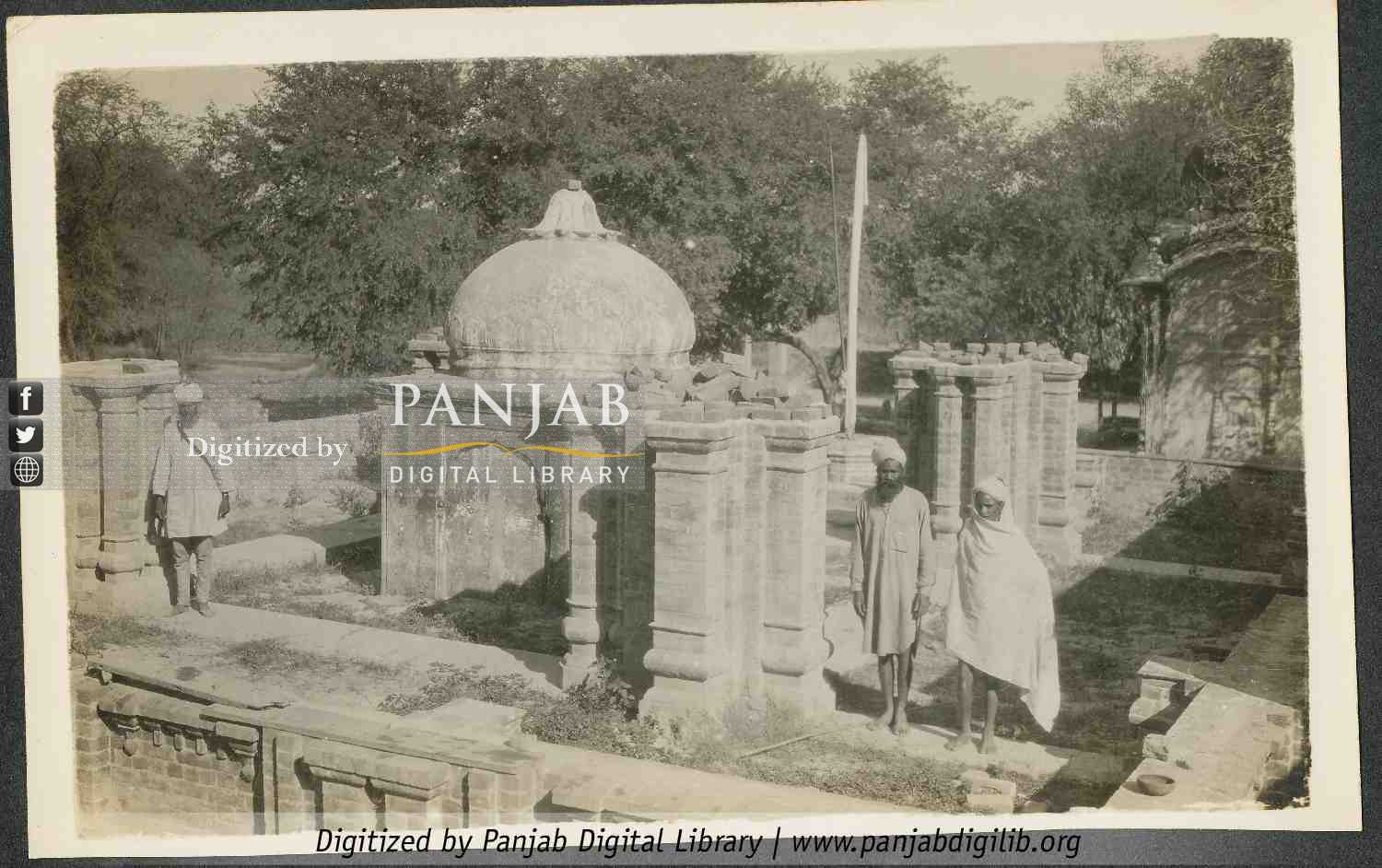
- Photograph of Gurdwara Khara Sahib by Dhanna Singh Chahal 'Patialvi', Mattu Bhaike, Gujranwala district, 20 October 1933

Religion
- Affiliation: Sikhism
- Ownership: Sikhs
- Governing body: Pakistan Sikh Gurdwara Prabandhak Committee
- Status: Restored

Location
- Location: Mattoo Bhaie Key, Nowshera Virkan tehsil, Gujranwala district, Punjab, Pakistan
- Interactive map of Gurdwara Khara Sahib

Architecture
- Style: Sikh (with classical Greek influences)
- Completed: c. 1933–1934

Gurdwara Khara Sahib, also known as Gurdwara Mattu Bhaike or Gurdwara Chhevin Patshahi, is a Sikh gurdwara located in Mattoo Bhaie Key in Gujranwala district, Punjab, Pakistan.

== History ==
The gurdwara commemorates the sixth Sikh guru, Guru Hargobind, who is believed to have visited the area when returning from Kashmir in 1620. While visiting the area, the guru is said to have conducted missionary work and have admonished tobacco. As per inscriptions, the main gurdwara was built by local Sikhs in 1990 Bk. (c. 1933–1934 CE), while other sources claim it was built between 1940 and 1945. A smaller structure beside the gurdwara is older and was originally constructed in the early 1900s, perhaps used as a Sukhasan room to house the Guru Granth Sahib.

A fair used to be held at its premises on the 7th of Saawan. The gurdwara was managed by the Shiromani Gurdwara Parbandhak Committee until partition. After partition in 1947, the local Sikh population left for the Republic of India. Sikh pilgrims began returning to visit the site in the 1960s. After the Babri Masjid incident in 1992, some people tried to destroy the gurdwara but the local villagers opposed their plans, so the building was spared. In July 2019, control over the gurdwara was handed over to the Sikh community. The temple began renovations under the purview of the Punjab Sikh Sangat (PSS) in 2019 and it was expected that the Guru Granth Sahib would be installed in it in November 2024. Renovations are being conducted by Sewa Sambhal.

== Architecture ==
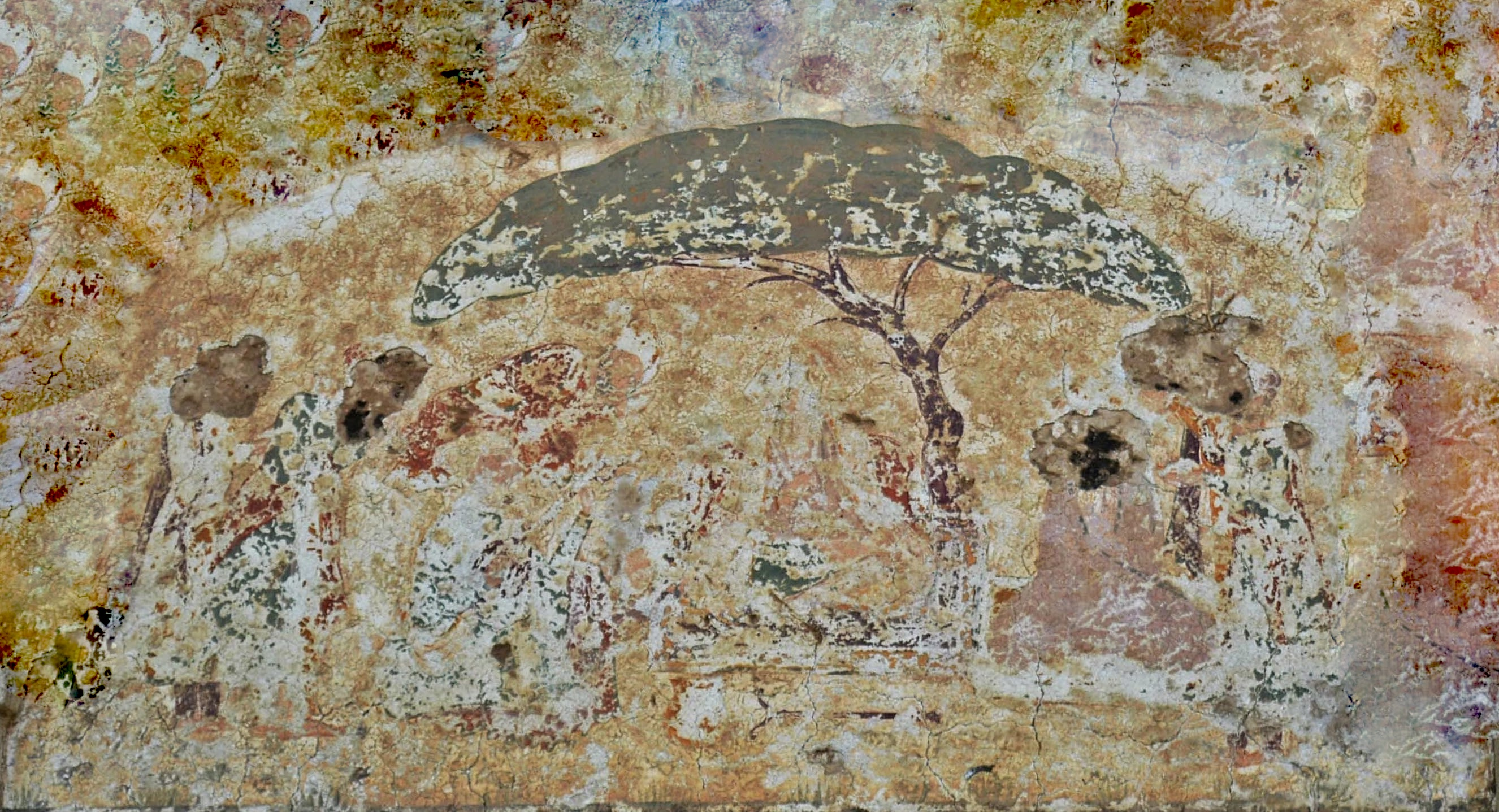
Faded and damaged fresco depicting Guru Nanak seated under the canopy of a tree, from a samadh near Gurdwara Khara Sahib, Mattu Bhaike, Punjab, Pakistan, circa early 1900's

Materials used to construct the complex includes marble, stone, glass, engraved wood, and stucco. The main gurdwara has classical Greek architectural influences, such as its Corinthian-style columns and cement-based decoratives adorning its façade. The edifice contains four entrances and eight windows. Fresco paintings depict stories (sakhis) from Guru Nanak's life. The gurdwara complex contains a samadh.
