= Hercharn Singh =

Pakistani army officer (born 1987)

- Punjabi (Gurmukhi): ਹਰਚਰਨ ਸਿੰਘ; (Shahmukhi): ہرچرن سنگھ
- Military career
- Allegiance: Pakistan
- Branch: Pakistan Army
- Rank: Lieutenant Colonel
- Units: Pakistan Army Ordnance Corps; 12 Baloch Regiment
- Conflicts: Insurgency in Balochistan

Hercharn Singh (Note: Punjabi (Gurmukhi): ਹਰਚਰਨ ਸਿੰਘ; (Shahmukhi): ہرچرن سنگھ) (born 1987) is the first Sikh officer to be commissioned in the Pakistan Army. He was born in Nankana Sahib, Pakistan, which is also the birthplace of the founder of Sikhism, Guru Nanak. He is currently serving as a lieutenant colonel.

== Early life ==
Hercharn passed his matriculation from Government Guru Nanak High School and passed his FSc (pre-engineering) in 2004 from Forman Christian College in Lahore. He then passed the ISSB examination in 2006 and joined the Pakistan Military Academy.

== Personal life ==
He is currently 36 years old and married his wife on 3 December 2017

== Graduation ==
Hercharn passed out from PMA from 116 L/C and was commissioned into the Pakistan Army on 27 October 2007.

Hercharn had told reporters:

"It is a matter of great privilege and an honour for me that today I am standing in front of you in the khaki uniform. I have been given a great responsibility."

== See also ==
- Ashok Kumar (soldier)
