= Mahindar Pal Singh =

Pakistani Cricketer

Personal information
- Born: 31 March 1996 (age 30); Nankana Sahib, Punjab, Pakistan
- Batting: Right handed
- Bowling: Right Arm Medium Fast

Mahindar Pal Singh (Punjabi, Urdu: مہندر پال سنگھ), is a Pakistani cricketer. He is predominantly a Right Arm Medium Fast bowler. He was the first Sikh cricketer from Pakistan.

In 2013, he signed up for the Abdul Qadir Academy. However, he was let go for being too inconsistent. Afterwards in 2016, he was picked for a fast bowlers camp in the NCA in Multan.

In 2021 Singh became the assistant manager of Peshawar Zalmi.
