= Gurdwara Ratan Talao =

Ratan Talao Gurdwara

Religion
- Affiliation: Sikhism

Location
- Location: Preddy Street, Karachi, Sindh, Pakistan
- Country: Pakistan
- Interactive map of Ratan Talao Gurdwara
- Coordinates: 24°51′39″N 67°1′24″E

Architecture
- Founder: Shiri Guru Sikh Sabha
- Established: before 1947

Ratan Talao Gurdwara is a gurdwara located on Preddy Street, Karachi, Pakistan.

== History ==
The gurdwara was founded in pre-partition India and was named after Shiri Guru Sikh Sabah. It holds significance for Sikhs as during the partition of India, in 1947, around 250 Sikhs were murdered at this place.

In 1958, a government college, named Government Ziauddin Memorial College Nabi Bagh, was started as a private school on the premises of gurdwara. It was nationalized in 1972.
