= Pakistan Sikh Gurdwara Parbandhak Committee =

Federal religious organization in Pakistan

- ਪਾਕਿਸਤਾਨ ਸਿੱਖ ਗੁਰਦੁਆਰਾ ਪ੍ਰਬੰਧਕ ਕਮੇਟੀ پاکستان سکھ گردوارہ پربندھک کمیٹی
- Abbreviation: PSGPC
- Formation: 11 April 1999
- Founder: Evacuee Trust Property Board
- Type: Constitutional Body
- Legal status: Active
- Purpose: Management of Sikh Gurdwaras in Pakistan
- Headquarters: Gurdwara Dera Sahib, Lahore, Punjab, Pakistan
- Region served: Pakistan
- Members: 10,000
- Official language: Punjabi; Urdu
- President: Ramesh Singh Arora
- Affiliations: Evacuee Trust Property Board
- Website: psgpc.pk
- Formerly called: Evacuee Trust Property Board

The Pakistan Sikh Gurdwara Parbandhak Committee (PSGPC) (Note: Urdu: پاکستان سکھ گردوارہ پربندھک کمیٹی) is a Pakistani Sikh religious organisation, established by the federal government of Pakistan. It is entrusted with the maintenance of Sikh religious institutions and places of worships in the country. The committee receives federal funding and is headquartered at the Gurdwara Dera Sahib in Lahore.

== History ==
Shiromani Gurdwara Parbandhak Committee (SGPC) was created in 1920s by struggle of Sikhs. After 1947 partition of Punjab, all religious properties of Sikhs came under Evacuee Trust Property Board. The Gurudwaras and associated properties in Pakistan were till managed by the Shiromani Gurudwara Parbandhak Committee in India till 1999. On 11 April 1999, Pakistan Sikh Gurudwara Parbandhak Committee was constituted under the ETPB chairmanship of ex-DG, ISI Lt. Gen. (Retd) Javed Nasir.

== Location ==
Its main organization is based in Lahore in the province of Punjab with Gurdwara Dera Sahib its headquarter.

== Powers ==
The PSGPC is opposed by the Shiromani Gurdwara Parbandhak Committee (SGPC), which regards itself as the sole guardian of Sikh institutions and religion worldwide. The right to sole guardian is given to SGPC every 4 years in a fair elections in which Sikhs from around the world participate. Unlike SGPC in India, PSGPC is not an Independent fully Sikh-owned body and is controlled by Evacuee Trust Property Board (ETPB) of Pakistan. Thirteen members are appointed by Government of Pakistan, and these then members elect the president and the secretary-general. The former head of the Committee Madan Singh resigned from the position due to the lack of autonomy. He accused that "PSGPC are cronies of the ETPB dominated by the Muslim community".

== Functions ==
This organization is entrusted with the maintenance of Sikh religious institutions, places of worships (gurdwara) and the well-being of the Pakistani Sikh community. It works to bring back sacred relics belonging to Sikhism at gurdwaras.

The body lists the following fourteen items as its functions:

1. Supervising and arranging langars (ingredients, cooking, and distribution) for each event;
2. Arranging and recording donations and deposits to and by the committee, managed by the convener and president of the committee;
3. Maintaining Sikh shrines and sites through preservation and restoration, as per Sikh religious principles. Arranging for the volunteers of Sikh tradespeople and labourers to achieve this;
4. Providing lodging and medical-aid to visiting Sikh yatris to ensure they have a safe and pleasant pilgrimage;
5. Setting-up the entering and leaving of Sikh yatri pilgrims into the country;
6. Arranging bhog and akhand path programs on religious occasions;
7. Appointing responsibilities to the sub-committees for greater efficiency and efficacy of the body;
8. Making arrangements for religious rites and observances at gurdwaras;
9. Arranging any publication and magazine;
10. Setting-up libraries and museums at gurdwaras;
11. Organizing the preparation and distribution of pinni parshad for the Sikh yatri pilgrims;
12. Keeping donation records and collecting/counting the donations from the golak (donation box) installed at all the gurdwaras;
13. Taking care of all the religious rituals during festivals;
14. Helping shrine branches on the matters related to Sikhs.

== Committee ==
The current president of the body is Ramesh Singh Arora and Satwant Kaur is the general-secretary.

PSGPC Committee
No.	Name	Designation
1	Ramesh Singh Arora	President
2	Satwant Kaur	General-Secretary
3	Tara Singh	Member
4	Gyan Singh	Member
5	Satwant Singh	Member
6	Hameet Singh	Member
7	Mahesh Singh	Member
8	Bagat Singh	Member
9	Sahib Singh	Member
10	Mimpal Singh	Member

== See also ==
- Akali movement
- Shiromani Gurdwara Parbandhak Committee
- Delhi Sikh Gurdwara Management Committee
- Haryana Sikh Gurdwara Parbandhak Committee
- Pakistan Sikh Council
- Sikhism in Pakistan
- Pakistan Hindu Mandir Management Committee
