= Gurdeep Singh (Pakistani politician) =

Pakistani politician

Member of the Senate of Pakistan
- Incumbent
- Assumed office March 2021
- Constituency: Khyber Pakhtunkhwa

Personal details
- Party: PTI (2021-present)

Gurdeep Singh is a Pakistani politician who is currently serving as a member of the Senate of Pakistan from Khyber Pakhtunkhwa since March 2021. He belongs to Pakistan Tehreek-e-Insaf. He is also the first Pakistani Sikh to be elected as a Senator in the Senate of Pakistan.
