= Ramesh Singh Arora =

Pakistani politician and social worker

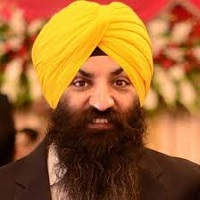

Minister of Human Rights and Minorities Punjab, Pakistan
- Incumbent
- Assumed office 7 March 2024
- Appointed by: Maryam Nawaz

Member of the Provincial Assembly of the Punjab
- Incumbent
- Assumed office 27 February 2024
- Constituency: NM‐368

President of the Pakistan Sikh Gurdwara Prabandhak Committee
- Incumbent
- Assumed office 1 March 2024
- Appointed by: Pakistan Sikh Gurdwara Prabandhak Committee

Personal details
- Born: Ramesh Singh Arora; 11 October 1974 (age 52) Nankana Sahib, Punjab, Pakistan
- Party: PMLN (2024–present)
- Spouse: Jaspreet Kaur Arora (m. 2005)
- Education: University of the Punjab
- Profession: Politician; Social worker

Ramesh Singh Arora (born 11 October 1974) is a Pakistani politician and social worker. He is an advocate for Sikh rights in Pakistan. He was appointed the Ambassador at large for the Kartarpur Sahib Corridor. He is first Sikh to hold office of provincial minister of the Punjab, Pakistan. He is currently the president of the Pakistan Sikh Gurdwara Prabandhak Committee.

== Biography ==
In 2013, he became the first Sikh in 63 years to be selected as a member of the Provincial Assembly of the Punjab. He served as a member of the National Commission for Minorities between 2011 and 2013, general secretary of the Pakistan Sikh Gurdwara Prabandhak Committee from 2009 to 2013 and chief executive of the Mojaz Foundation between 2008 and 2013. He served as chairman of the Standing Committee on Commerce & Investment, patron-in-chief of the Pakistan Sikh Council, and a member of the Pakistan Sikh Gurdwara Prabandhak Committee.

On 6 March 2024, he was inducted into the provincial cabinet of Chief Minister Punjab Maryam Nawaz and became the first Sikh in Pakistan's history to be appointed a minister in the Punjab government. He worked in the Pakistan Poverty Alleviation Fund (PPAF) during his early career and supported the most vulnerable communities across Pakistan through poverty alleviation and community empowerment programs.

On May 17, 2025, he and Kheal Das Kohistani represented Pakistan at the Papal inauguration of Pope Leo XIV.

== Personal life ==
Ramesh Singh Arora married Jaspreet Kaur Arora in 2005.
