= Nadhra Shahbaz Naeem Khan =

Pakistani scholar and historian

Nadhra Shahbaz Naeem Khan is an associate professor of art history and the director of the Gurmani Centre for Languages and Literature at the Lahore University of Management Sciences in Lahore, Pakistan.

== Biography ==
Nadhra's mother was a partition refugee from Ludhiana. For much of her life, Nadhra blamed the Sikhs for the partition violence but her views changed and she began objectively researching the Sikh history in Pakistan after visiting the Ath-Dara pavilion of the Lahore Fort for a research project and a spontaneous chance-visit to the Samadhi of Ranjit Singh in Winter 2004 after a security guard suggested it to her.

Much of her research focuses on Sikh architecture in Pakistan and she studies the art and architecture of Punjab from the 16th to the early 20th centuries during the Mughal, Sikh, and colonial periods. She attempts to challenge colonial-era misunderstandings of Sikh art and architecture that remains prevalent today and advocates for the preservation of Sikh sites. She graduated with a degree in graphic design from the Department of Fine Arts, University of the Punjab. She completed her PhD dissertation on the ornamental program of the Samadhi of Ranjit Singh in Lahore, with her rediscovering lost external murals decorating the edifice. She co-curated the exhibition Maharaja Ranjit Singh’s Toshakhāna: The Material Splendor of 19th Century Punjab at the Lahore University of Management Sciences from 12th–19 December 2025 along with Murtaza Taj. She helped establish a website dedicated to Sikh heritage in Pakistan, sikhvirsa.org.pk, which features the Sikh Gallery, Lahore Fort collection (including the Princess Bamba Collection). She works as a consultant historian for the Aga Khan Cultural Service–Pakistan in regards to the Lahore Fort. She has authored a number of research articles. Her research has been praised for overcoming national and religious boundaries. She also helped restore the Kuri Bagh (Daughter's Garden) in Lahore, for which she was awarded by the French embassy.

== Bibliography ==
- Khan, Nadhra Shahbaz Naeem (2 October 2018). Hegewald, Julia A. B. (ed.). The Samadhi of Maharaja Ranjit Singh in Lahore: A Summation of Sikh Architectural and Decorative Practices. EB-Verlag Dr. Brand. ISBN 9783868932713.

== Awards ==
- LUMS Research Award (2018–19)
- Times Higher Education (THE) Awards Asia (2023)
- Ordre des Palmes académiques (2025)
