= Samadhi of Ranjit Singh =

Building in Lahore, Pakistan

Coordinates: 31.5893°N 74.3113°E

- Raṇjīt Singh dī Samādhī (Punjabi)
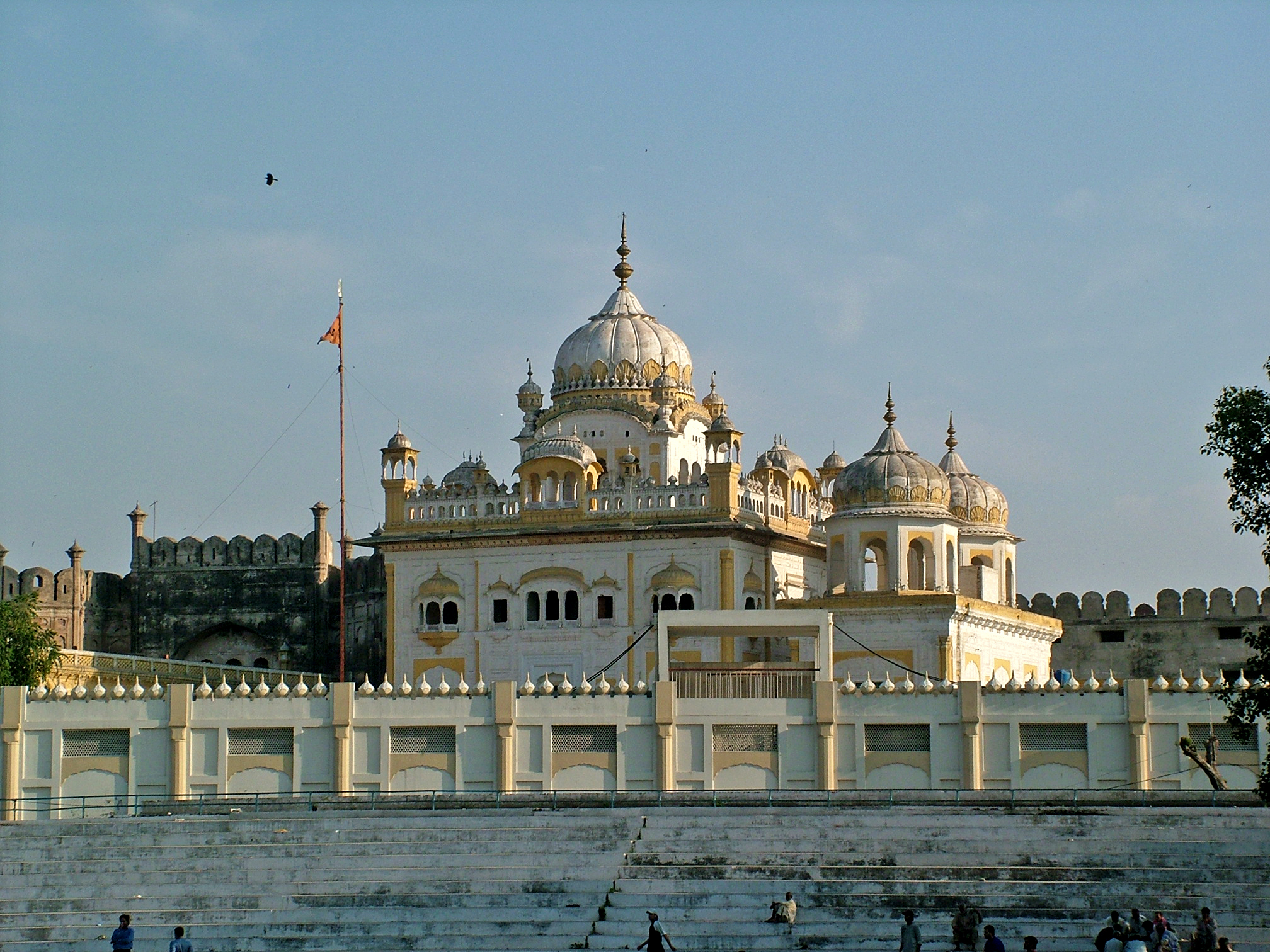
- The Samadhi was built next to Badshahi Mosque and Gurdwara Dera Sahib
- Interactive map of Samadhi of Ranjit Singh
- Location: Lahore, Punjab; Pakistan
- Type: Samadhi (shrine)
- Completion date: 1848

The Samadhi of Ranjit Singh (Note: Punjabi: رݨجیت سنگھ دی سمادھی (Shahmukhi), ਰਣਜੀਤ ਸਿੰਘ ਦੀ ਸਮਾਧੀ (Gurmukhi); Urdu: رنجیت سنگھ کی سمادھی), also known as the Marhi of Ranjit Singh, is a 19th-century building in Lahore, Punjab, Pakistan, that houses the funerary urn of the former Sikh Maharaja Ranjit Singh. It is located within the Walled City, adjacent to the Lahore Fort, Badshahi Mosque, and the Gurdwara Dera Sahib. Its construction was started by his son and successor Kharak Singh during his rule of around 100 days, after the Maharaja's death in 1839, and completed nine years later. The structure is the last major state-funded architectural project of independent Punjab before annexation by the British in 1849. It overlooks the Hazuri Bagh, built by Ranjit Singh, to its south.

== Names ==
The site is referred to as a samādh or marhī in the local Punjabi vernacular, with samādhi being the Sanskritized term.

== Admission ==
Visiting the site is only permitted to local or visiting Sikhs, with all others requiring special permission from the Evacuee Trust Property Board.

== History ==
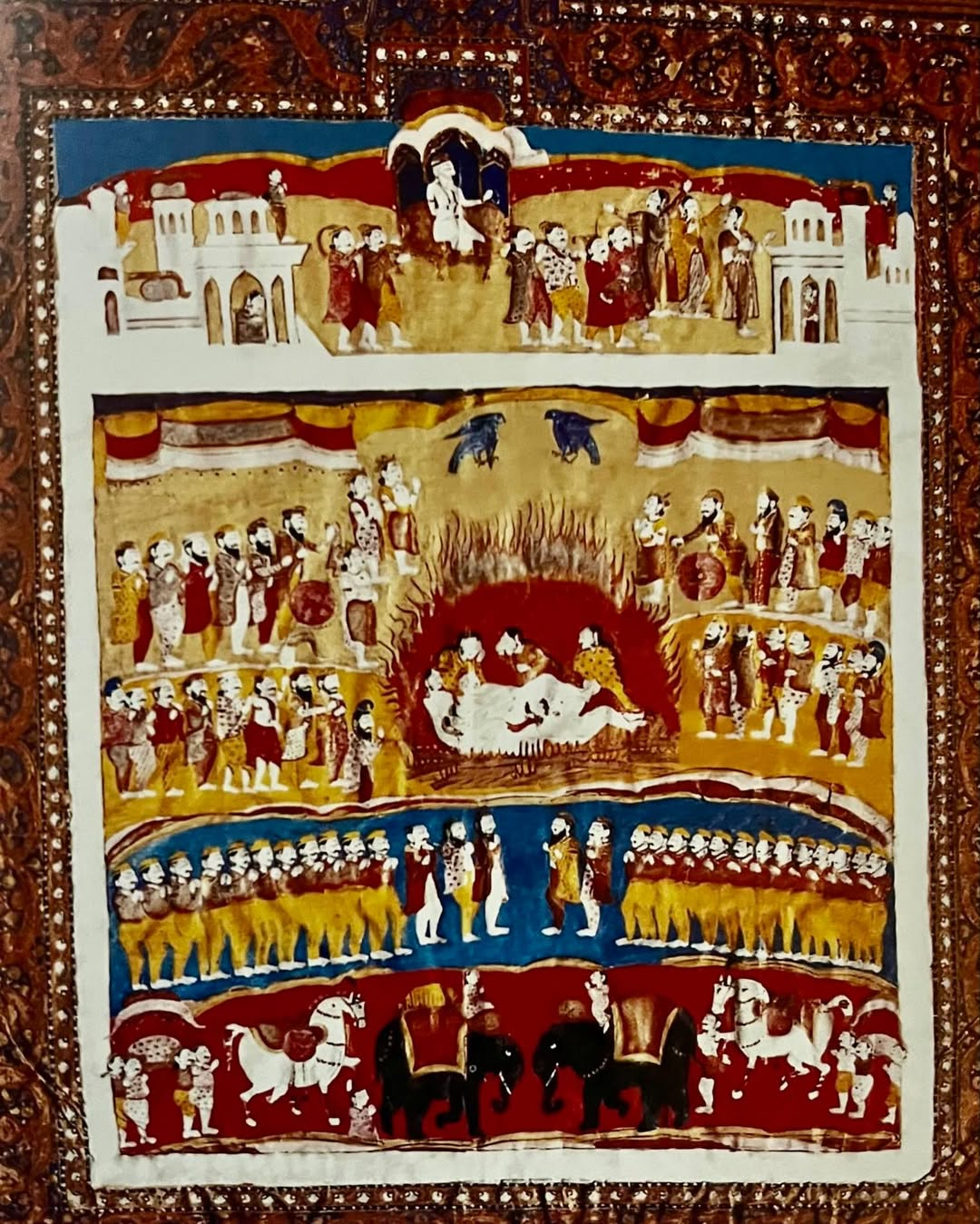
Painting of the funeral and cremation of Maharaja Ranjit Singh and some of his queens performing sati, c. 1840

Maharaja Ranjit Singh died on Thursday, 27 June 1839, with there being a large funeral and cremation of his remains. The hair of the corpse was washed with Ganges water, the body was bathed and dressed in new clothes, being placed on a bier of sandalwood decorated with gold flowers. Four queens, most principally Rani Katochan, committed sati on his funeral pyre. Three days after the cremation, Kharak Singh retrieved his father's ashes. His ashes were brought to Haridwar to be dispersed into the Ganges river. There were initial proposals for a large-scale funerary monument at Shahdara across the Ravi River, comparable to Jahangir’s mausoleum. However, eventually a more modest construction began under the reign of Ranjit Singh's successor, Kharak Singh. Few details on the structure's construction are given by the court-chronicler, Sohal Lal Suri, and its construction occurred during a period of hardship for the court of Lahore, due to internal struggles.

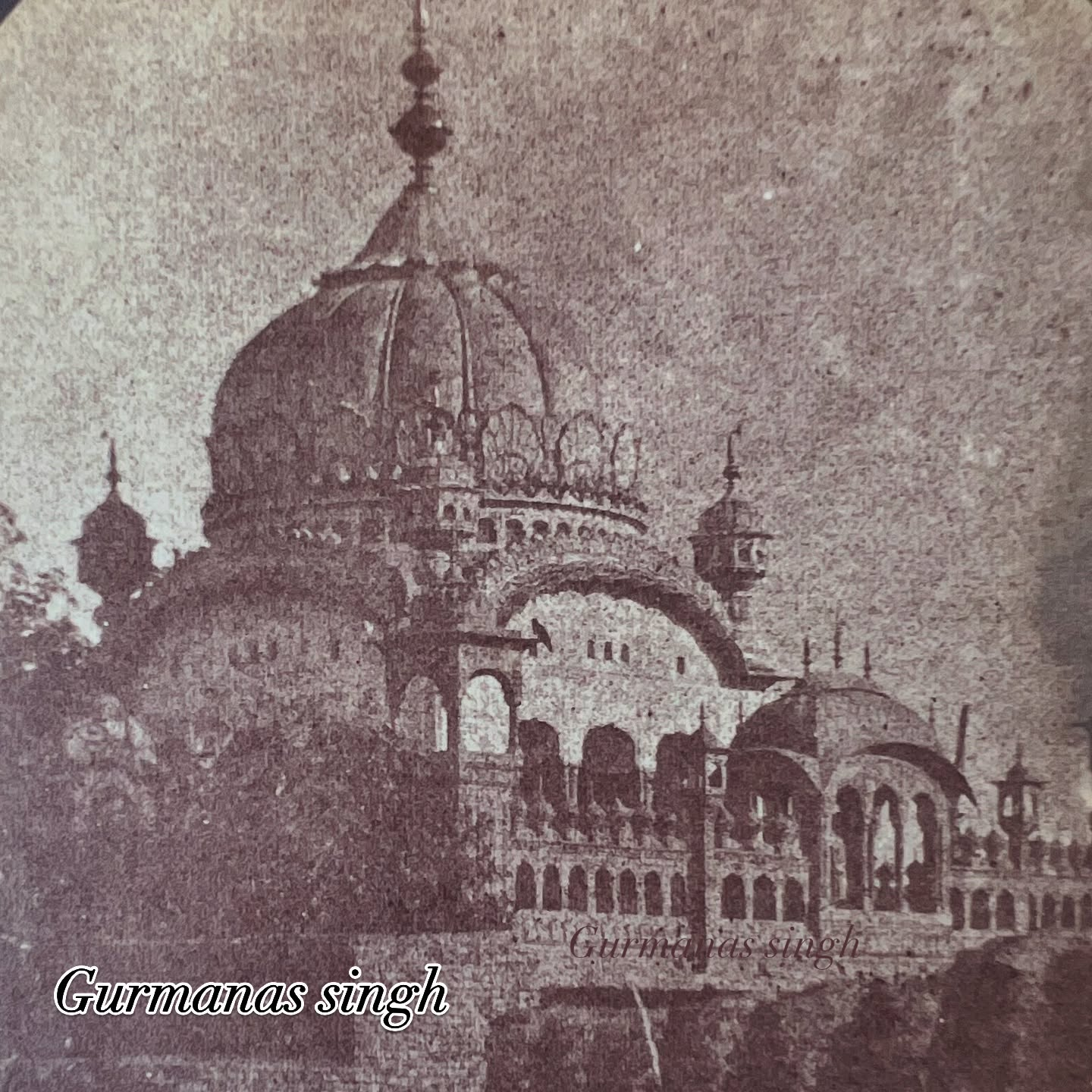
Photograph of the Samadhi of Maharaja Ranjit Singh in Lahore, Sikh Empire, by John McCosh, 1849

Construction of the mausoleum began in August 1839 but its completion was delayed due to infighting within the Sikh Empire between different factions. Construction of the building was started by his son, Kharak Singh on the spot where he was cremated, and was completed by his youngest son, Duleep Singh in 1848. However, according to Khan, the construction of the monument was still not totally complete when the British annexed the territory in 1849. The new British-rulers of Punjab, having annexed the Sikh Empire in 1849, undertook repairs of the mausoleum, which was completed in 1851. For several decades afterwards, the samadhi functioned as both a mausoleum and gurdwara, with the primary Sikh scripture, the Guru Granth Sahib, being installed in it.

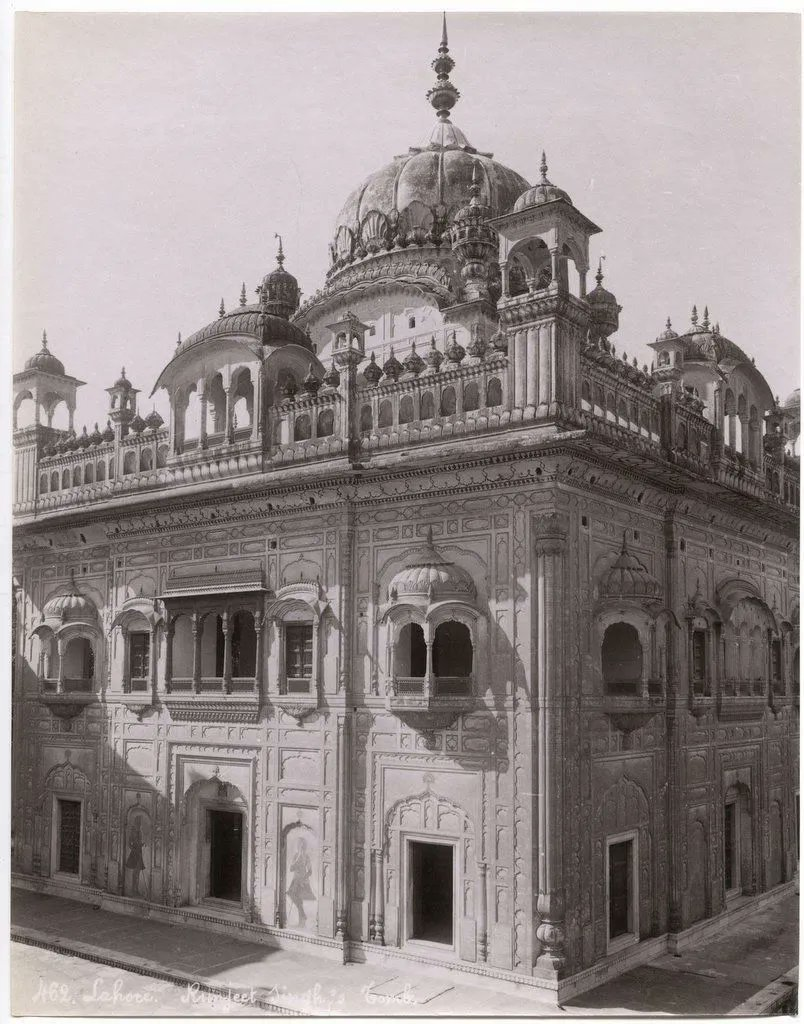
Photograph of the Samadhi of Maharaja Ranjit Singh, c. 1880s

Urdu literary works about the city of Lahore, such as by Nur Ahmad Chishti (1867), Mufti Ghulam Sarwar Lahori (1877), Kanhaya Lal (1884), and Syad Muhammad Latif (1892), cover the samadhi in-detail, with a work by Chishti in 1867 documenting a white, marble statue of Ganesha located on the eastern entrance of the complex and that its interior contained marble statues of Hindu goddesses with silk curtains on them, with one of these goddess statues supposedly being donated by Jind Kaur. The Ganesha and goddess statues mentioned in these accounts cannot be traced today. Furthermore, the account records that both the Guru Granth Sahib and Dasam Granth were kept in prakash (installed and read from) located on the southern side of the central chhatrī, with there being two granthis appointed to read from the scriptures. Lahori and Lal's own works claim that Kanhaya Lal was employed by the British as an engineer to save the structure from collapse, due to issues related to its eight columns in the interior not being able to bear the load of the dome, with Lal deciding to add an additional eight columns to help bear the weight of the dome and prevent an imminent collapse. Lal further stated that he repaired cracked, marble columns by adding iron clamps to them.

Pakistani historian Nadhra Khan completed her PhD dissertation on the structure.

== Architecture ==
=== Building ===
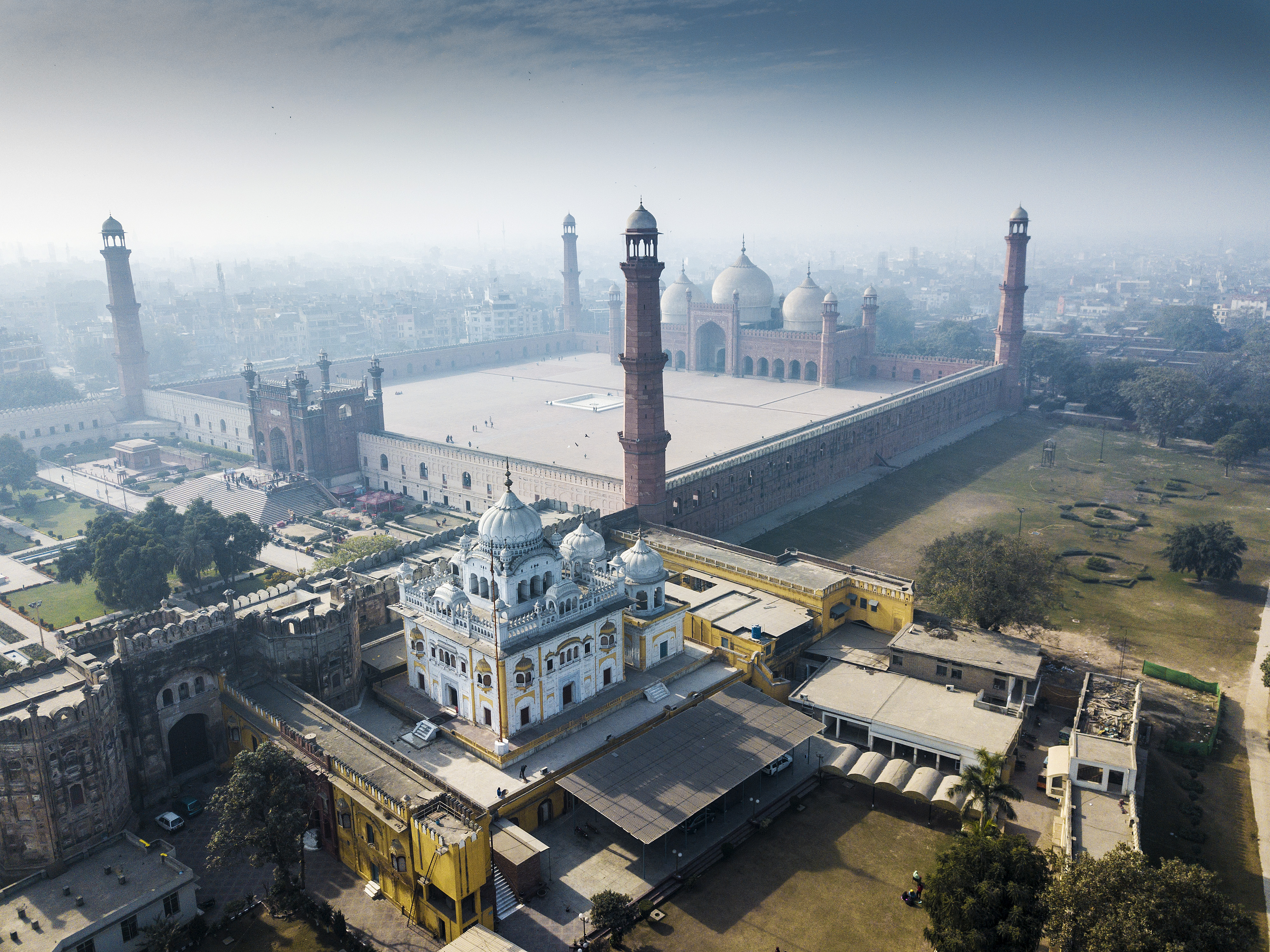
The shrine was built at the northeast corner of the Badshahi Mosque.

The building combines elements of Sikh, Hindu, and Islamic architecture. Nadhra Khan traces its external architectural influences to principally Kangra and Dogra sources, which share similarities to the Sikh style of the Punjab Plains. Portions of the building are believed to have been plundered from the adjacent Lahore Fort.

The building has gilded fluted domes and cupolas, and an ornate balustrade around the upper portion of the building. The front of the doorway has images of Ganesh, Devi and Brahma that are cut from red sandstone. The dome is decorated with Nāga (serpent) hood designs - the product of Hindu craftsmen that worked on the project. The wooden panels on the ceiling are decorated with stained glass work, while the walls are richly decorated with floral designs. The ceilings are decorated with glass mosaic work.

=== Funerary urns ===
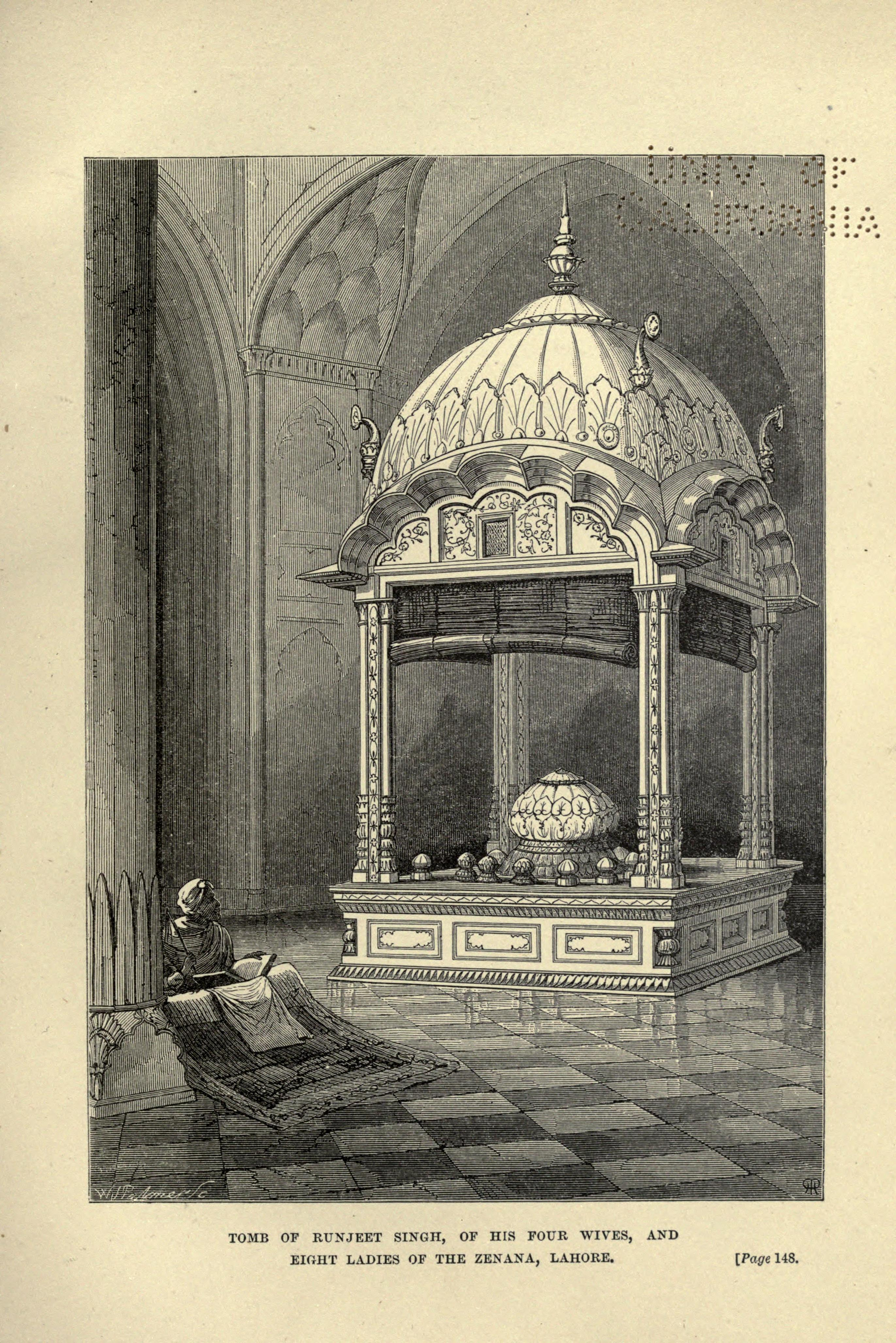
Illustration of the chhatri and funerary urns located within the Samadhi of Ranjit Singh in Lahore, from Letters from India and Kashmir (1874)

The site contains a commorative chhatrī dedicated to Ranjit Singh. Ranjit Singh's ashes are contained in a marble urn in the shape of a lotus, sheltered under a marble pavilion inlaid with pietra dura, in the centre of the tomb. Surrounding him, in smaller urns, are the ashes of four Hindu sati queens and seven concubines. According to Nadhra Khan, these marble knobs are symbolic representations of the women who committed sati on the funerary pyre.

=== Scholarly assessments ===
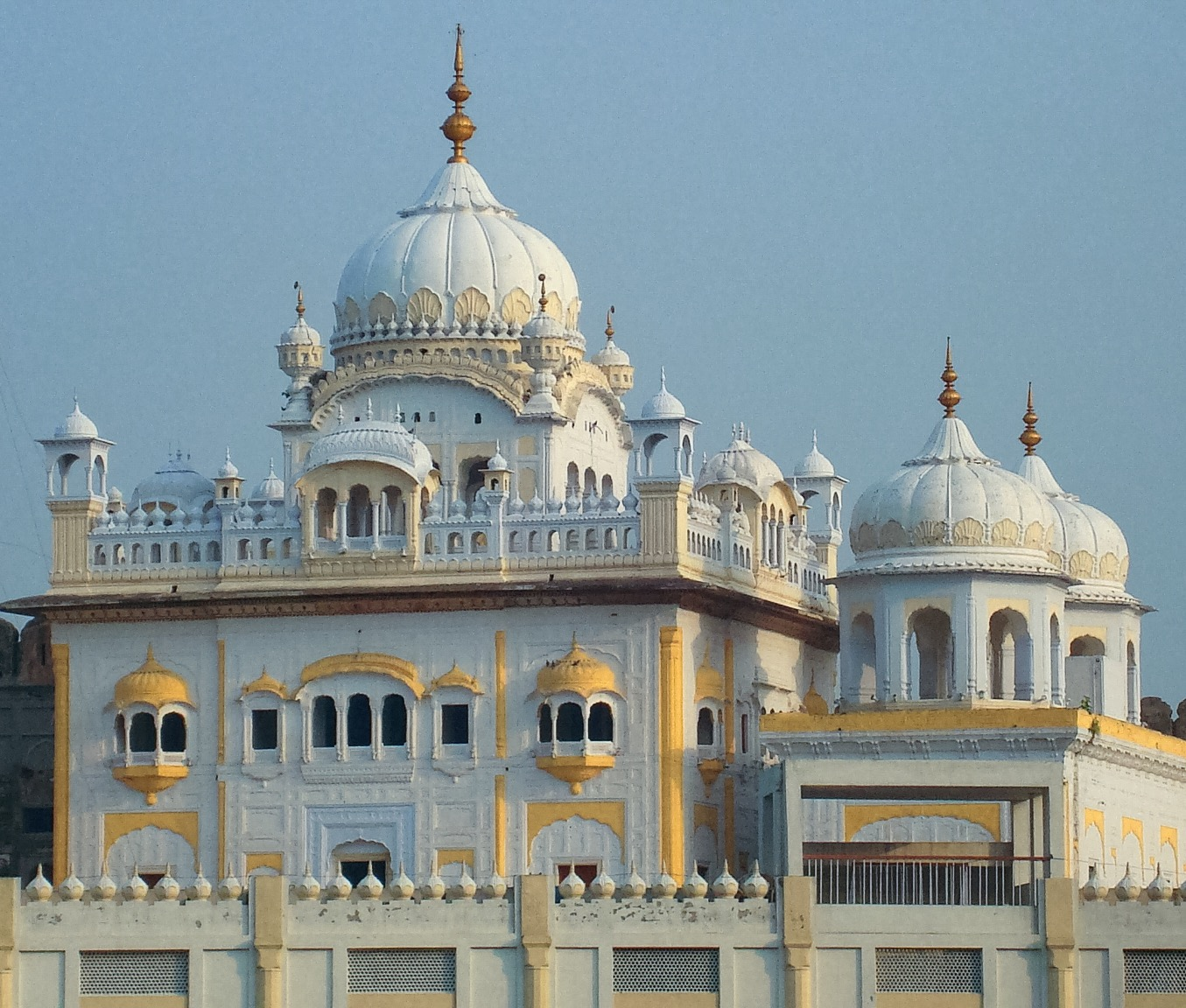
The samadhi combines Hindu, Islamic, and Sikh motifs.

Various authors in the 19th and 20th centuries, such as Thornton, Khan, Ihsan H. Nadiem, Nazir Ahmed Chaudhry, Kamil Khan Mumtaz, F. S. Aijazuddin, wrote assessments on the architecture of the samadhi, with most being negative due to being influenced by views first expressed by Thornton.

Thomas Henry Thornton wrote a disparaging account of the structure in 1876:

One of the latest specimens of Sikh architecture is the Mausoleum of Ranjit Singh himself, his son and grandson. The building is, as usual, in design substantially Hindu, overlaid with Muhammadan details, and does not bear close inspection; but the effect at a distance is not unpleasing

— Thomas Henry Thornton, Thornton & Kipling 1876: 158

Khan Muhammad Waliullah Khan, writing in 1961, being influenced by Thornton's earlier account, gives an unfavourable assessment of the structure's architectural design:

[…] an unhappy mixture of Hindu and Muslim architecture, composed and constructed in conformity with Hindu tastes, with the result that it has no dignity of the Muslim architecture, it has all crowdedness of the Hindu style

— Khan 1973 [1961]: 82–83

Nearly all of the 19th and 20th century accounts of the structure fail to take note or recognize its distinctively Sikh features. According to Nadra Khan, the structure represents the "pitome of Sikh architectural ornament and art", building upon previous architectural traditions with Sikh innovations, blending both the Punjabi and Pahari art styles in its painted murals within its interior, showcasing a merging of Sikh and Hindu themes, which have been ignored. She states that the samadhi has distinctively Sikh features and can be regarded as an "indigenous art".

== Artwork ==
The walls of the samadhi are decorated with murals in the form of frescoes, which are an amalgamation of Pahari and Punjabi styles, featuring both Sikh and Hindu religious themes. They were painted between 1839–49. Forty-eight individual fresco wall-paintings remain on the two-levels of the samadhi's interior. The themes depicted include the Sikh gurus, scenes from the Indic epics, nāyaks and nāyikās, and other motifs.

== Associated monuments ==
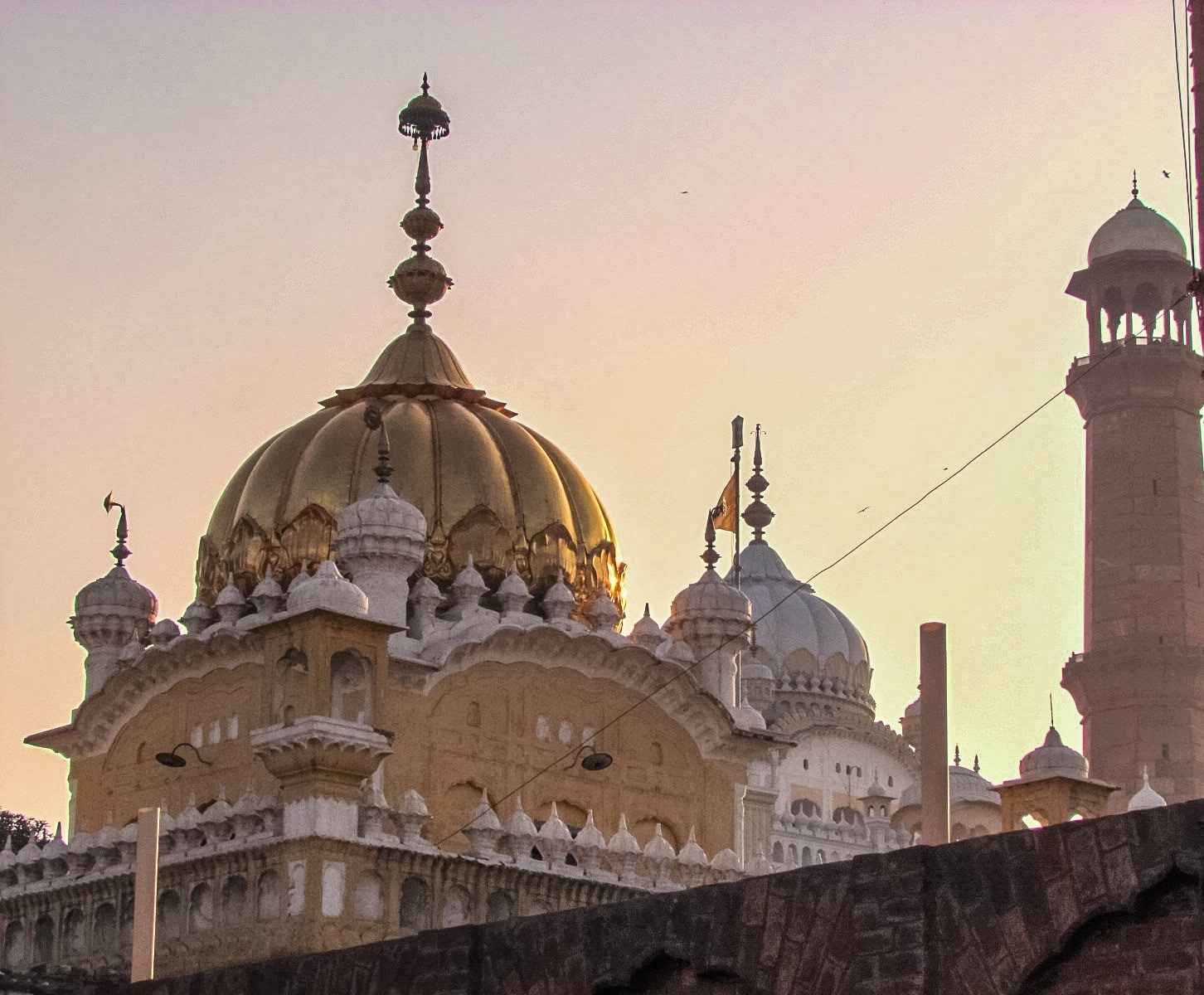
The Gurdwara Dera Sahib is adjacent to the samadhi, and commemorates the spot where Guru Arjan Dev Ji died.

The complex faces the Hathi Pol (Elephant Gate) of the Lahore Fort. Two small samadhi monuments to the west of the main building commemorate Maharaja Ranjit Singh's son Maharaja Kharak Singh and grandson Nau Nihal Singh, along with their wives. The patron of the samadhis of Kharak Singh and Nau Nihal Singh is unknown. The building is located adjacent to Gurdwara Dera Sahib, the place of martyrdom of Guru Arjun. The samadhi of Maharani Jind Kaur was also located here but has since been demolished.

== Gallery ==
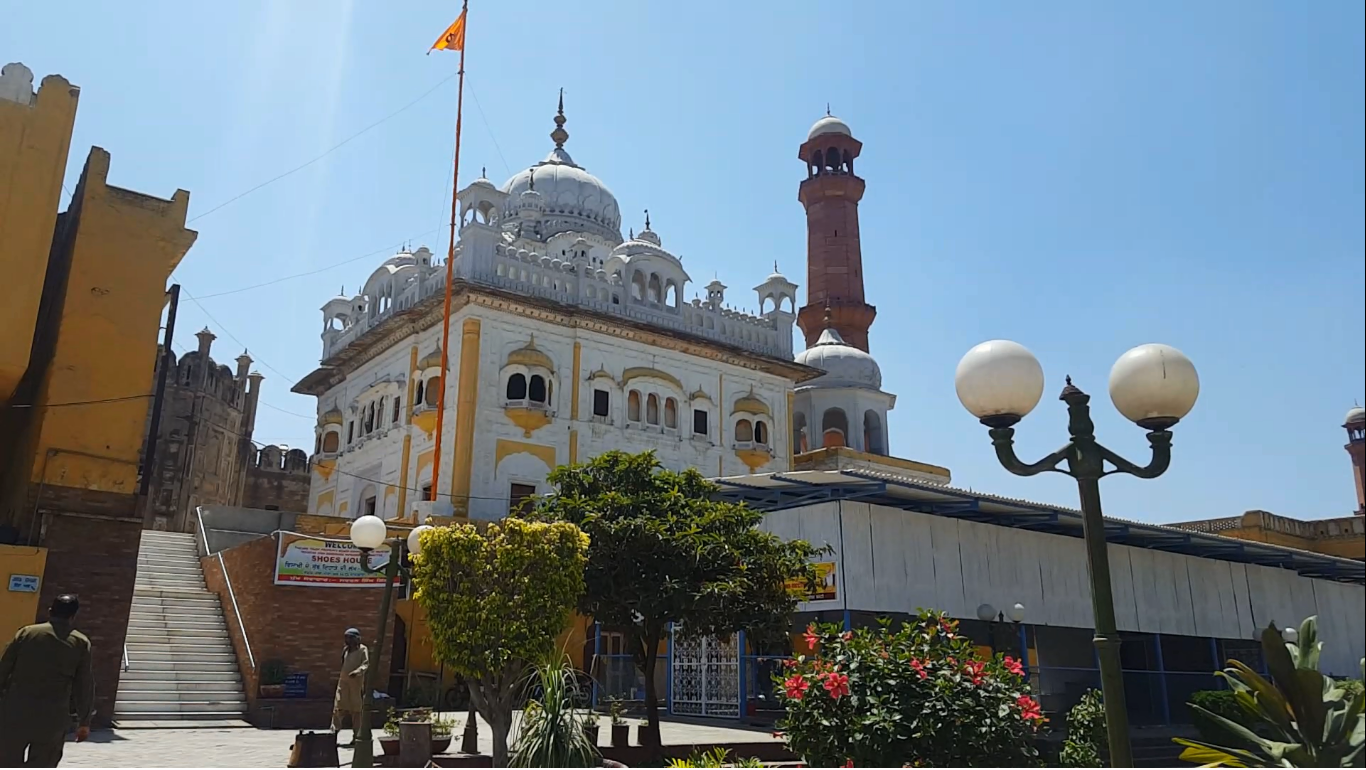

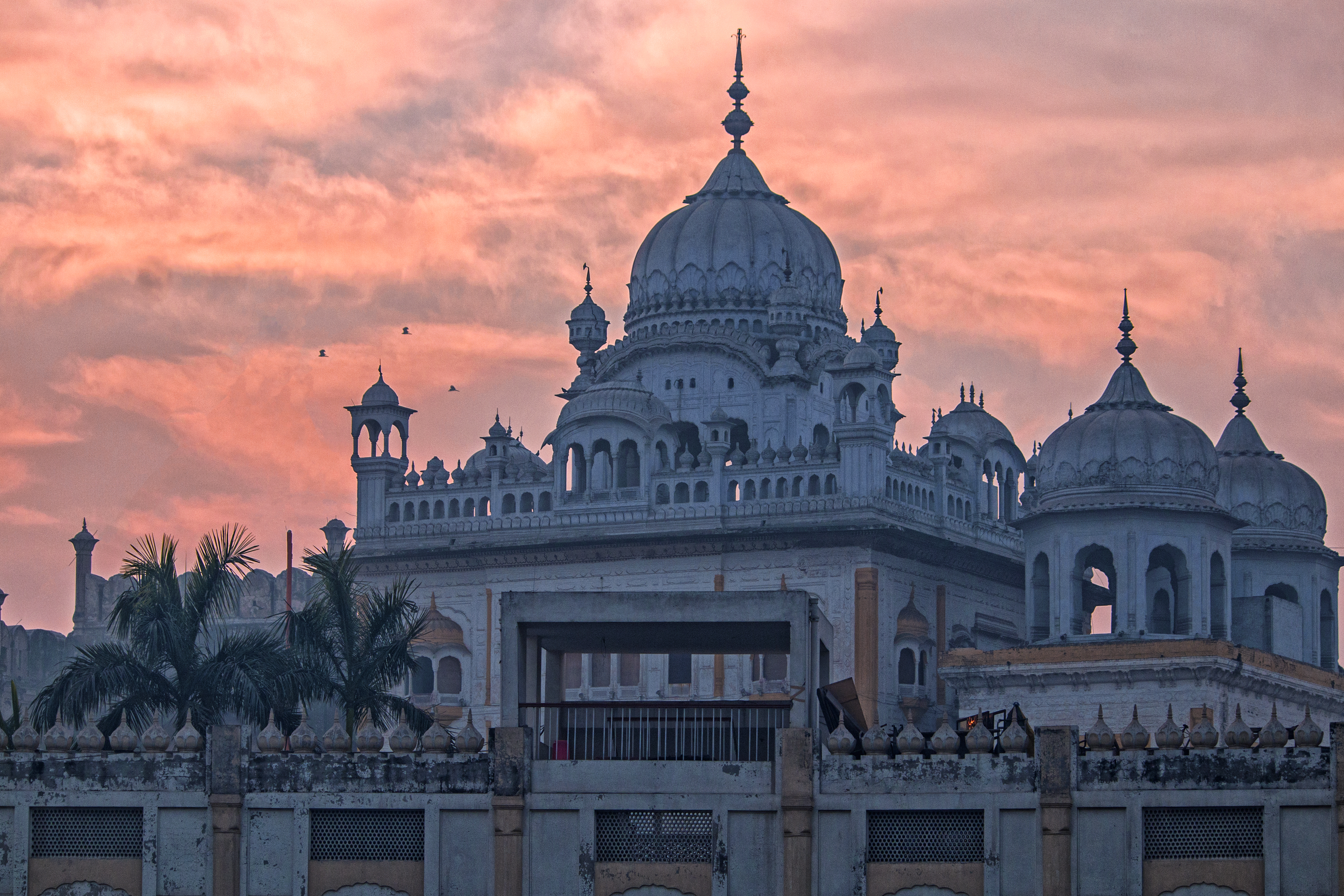

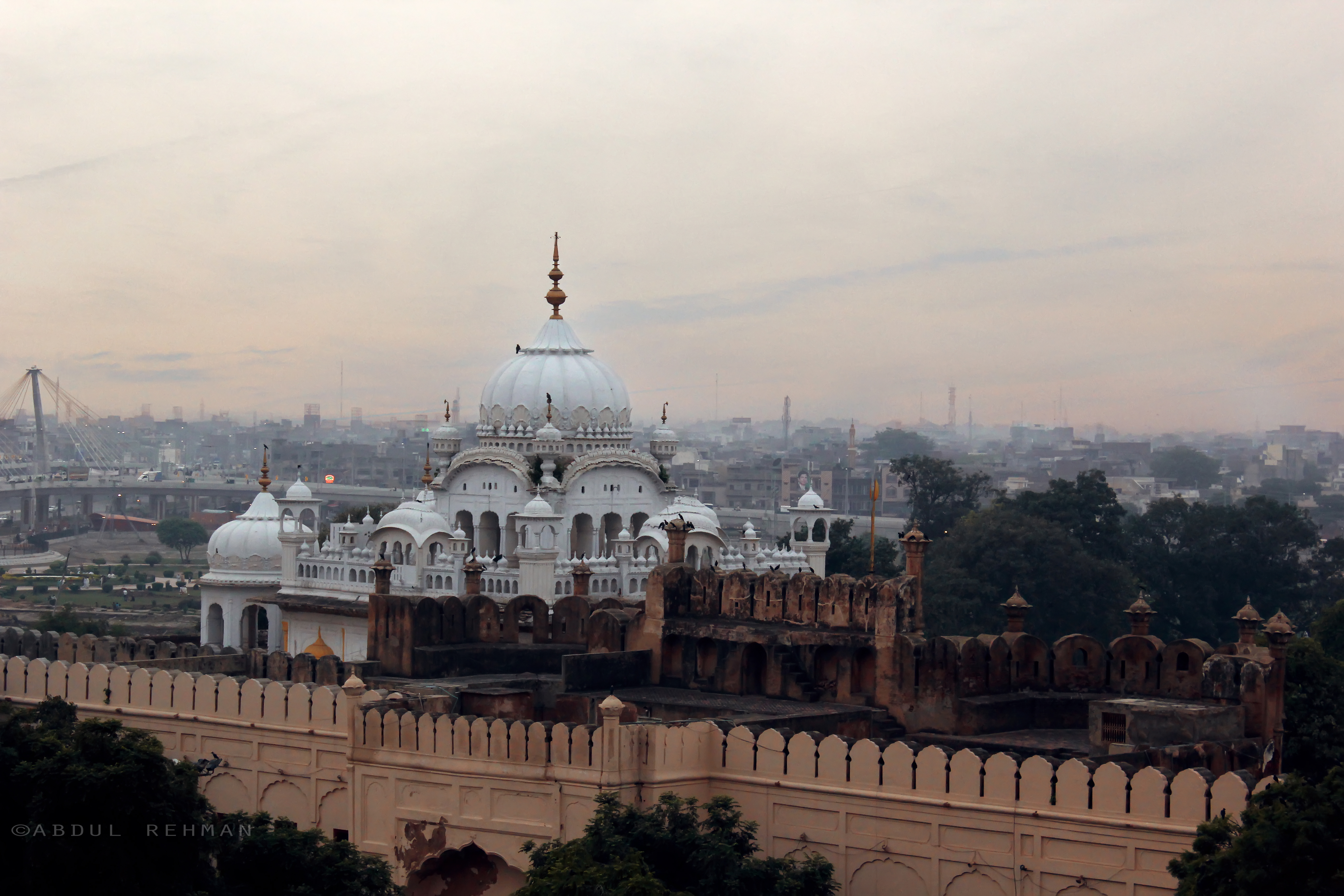
Samadhi of Ranjit Singh in 2015

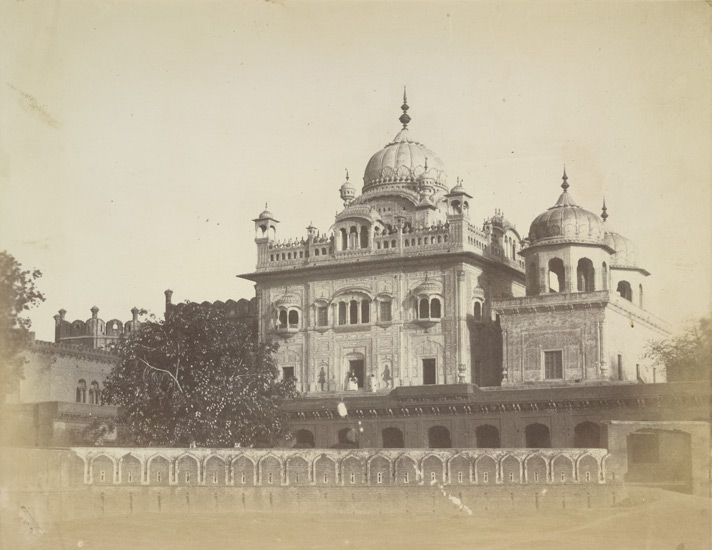
The Samadhi of Emperor Ranjit Singh in 1880s.

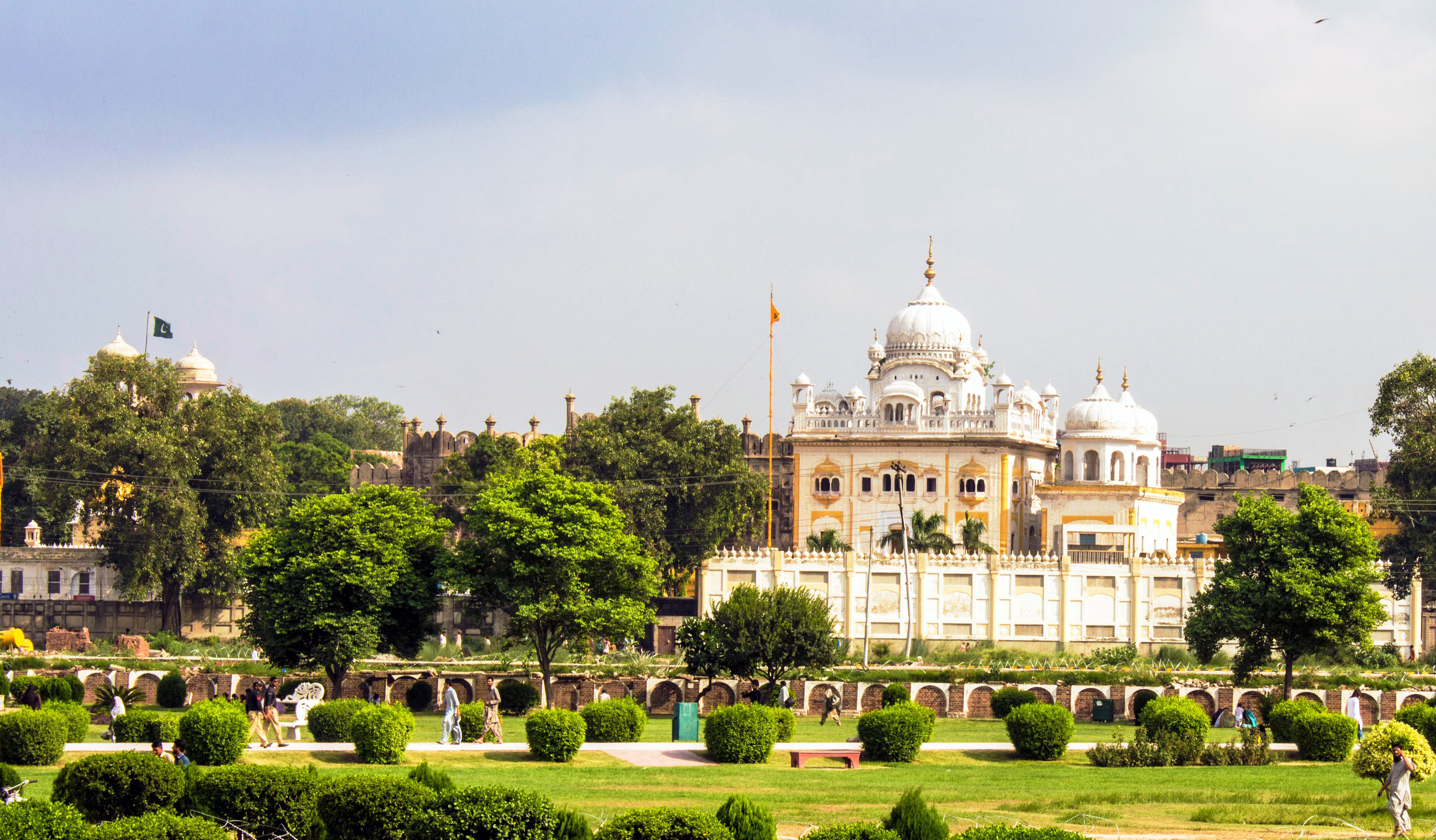
A view of the Samadhi.

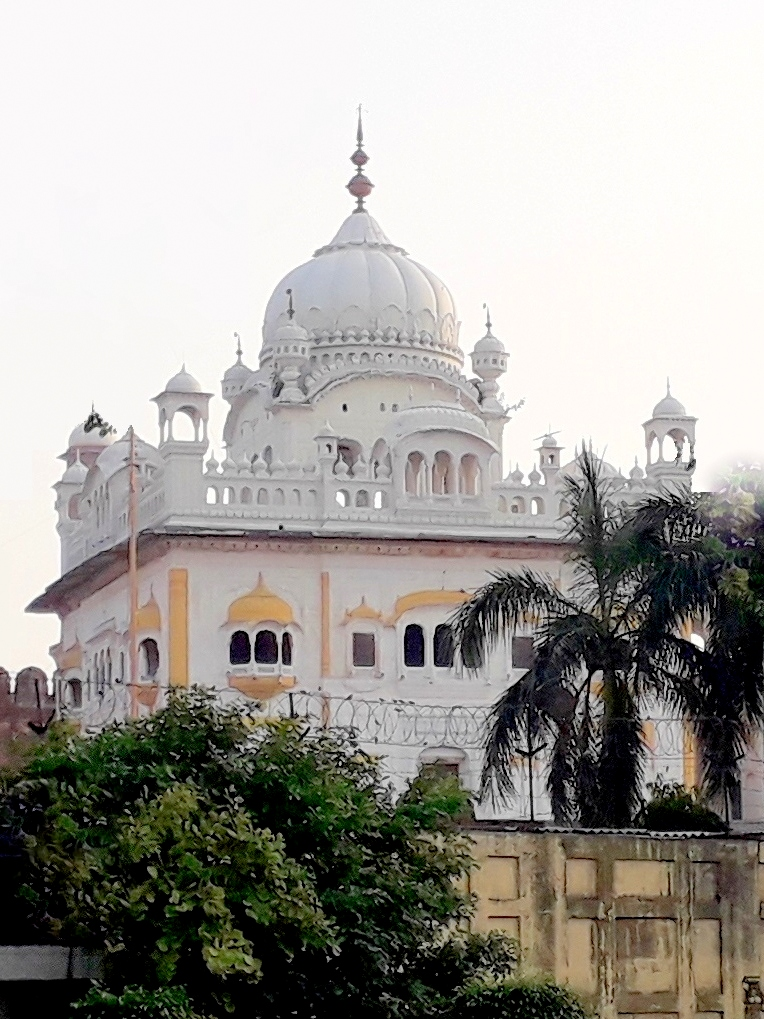
Samadhi Ranjit Singh

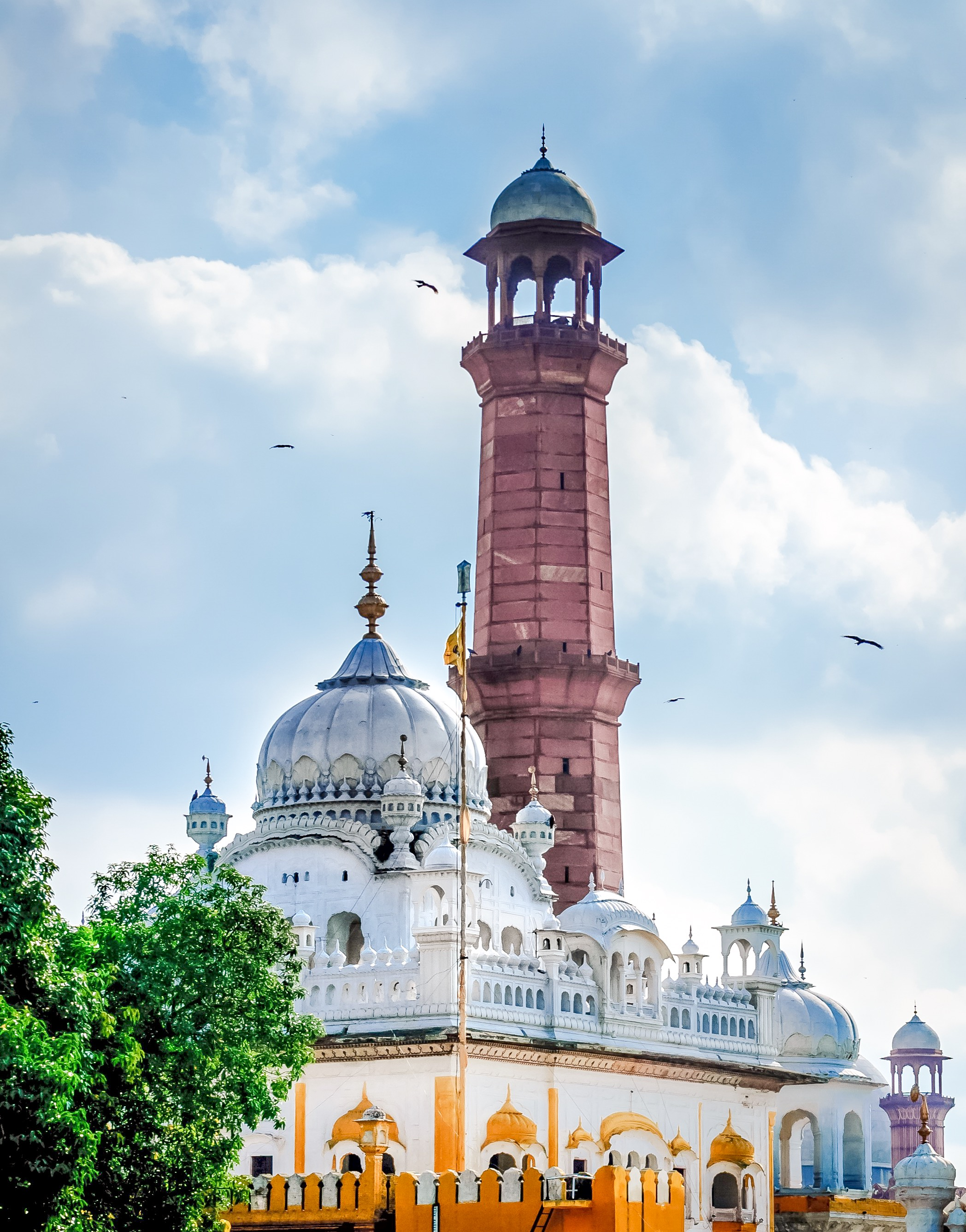

== See also ==
- Evacuee Trust Property Board
- List of mausolea and shrines in Pakistan
