= Ath-Dara =

Marble pavilion in Lahore, Pakistan

Coordinates: 31°35′23″N 74°18′48″E

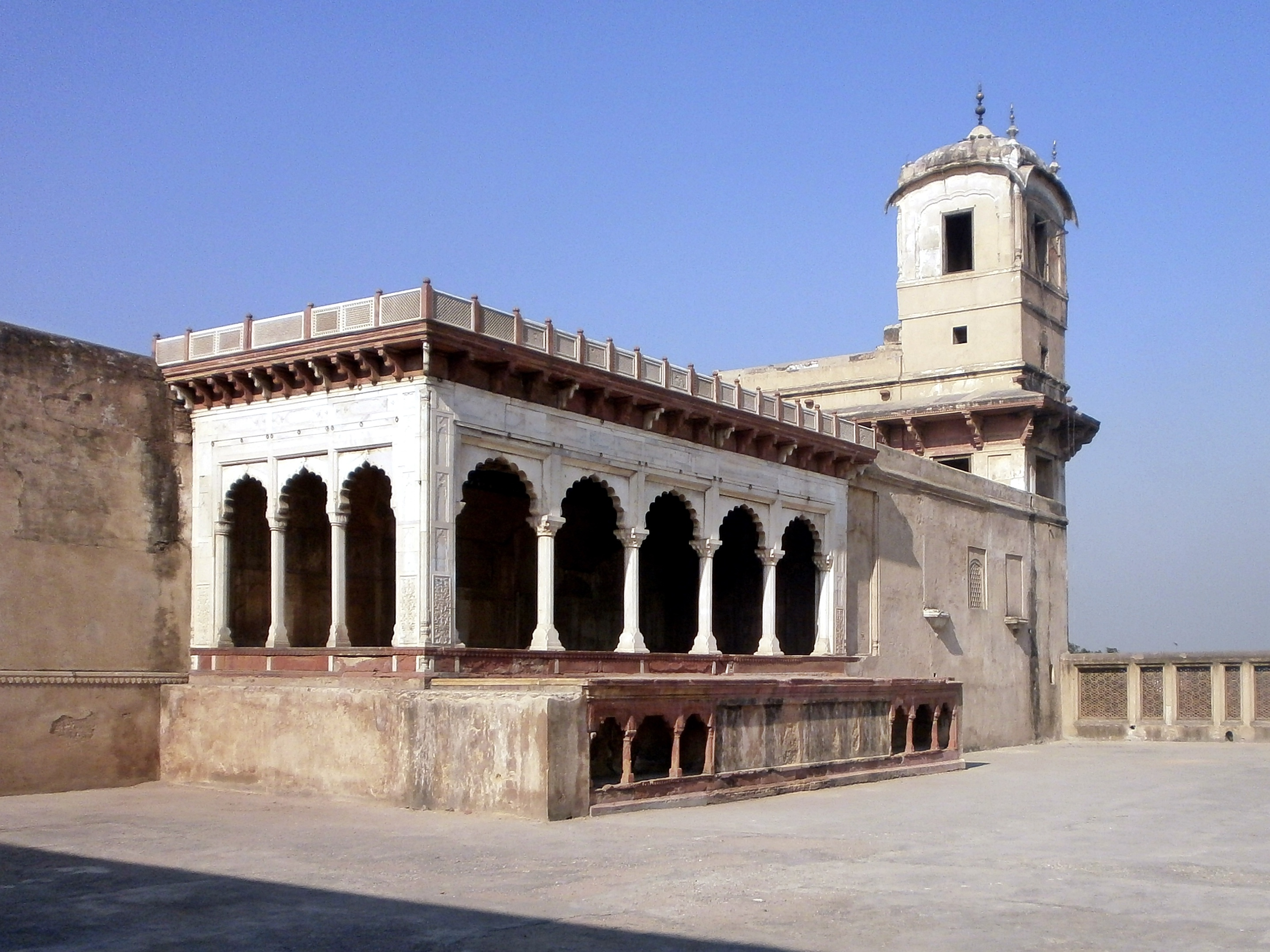
Ath Dara, built during the reign of Maharaja Ranjit Singh and used as his court.

The Ath-Dara, also spelled Athdara (meaning "eight-gated pavilion") is a Sikh structure in the form of a marble pavilion of the Shah Burj Quadrangle of the Lahore Fort located in Lahore, Pakistan. It was constructed by Maharaja Ranjit Singh of the Sikh Empire (r. 1799–1839) and served as the location of his court. It is situated near the Shish Mahal pavilion.

== History ==
Āth darā, an elevated pavilion with eight openings, was built by Maharaja Ranjit Singh for use as his kacheri or court-of-justice. The structure is part of the Sikh-era related constructions of the Lahore Fort, alongside the Haveli Mai Jindan, Huzoori Bagh Bara Dar, Haveli of Kharak Singh, and some structures on the Sheesh Mahal.

Ranjit Singh chose the Musamman Burj within the fortress for both his private and official use and selected the Shish Mahal ("palace of mirrors") chambers or mirror pavilions within the Musamman Burj, built by the Mughal emperor Shah Jahan, as his personal residence. According to Bobby Singh Bansal, it is unknown when the pavilion was constructed but the Athdara was constructed by demolishing the Shah Burj structure that formerly stood at its location.

== Description ==
The Athdara is situated on the western-periphery of the Shah Burj enclosure. It is five metres in-length and two metres in-width. It consists of eight doorways and is connected to the adjacent Shish Mahal structure. It was constructed by the Sikh rulers in the Mughal architectural-style. It architecture resembles the Shah Burj structure that it replaced. The structure is made of white marble and red sandstone brackets, raised on a plinth of half a metre in-height. Furthermore, there are uniquely Sikh architectural features, such as marble trellis screens and ornamental railings located on the roof. The pavilion has intricately carved ceilings. The ceiling is decorated with colourful mirror-work, and Kangra style frescoes depicting Krishna are present on the interior walls. There was formerly a rear-entryway connecting to the Shish Mahal but this entrypoint has since been bricked-up. This bricked-up secret-passageway contained the Hammam (royal-bath) of the maharaja in-between the Athdara and Shish Mahal, which was shaped in the form of a lion's mouth.

A watchtower (six metres elevation and two square metres in-length) located adjacent to the structure served as a small, private gurdwara for the maharaja where the Guru Granth Sahib was kept in the top-most room. The inner-walls and stairways of the small watchtower do not contain intricate designs or artwork, unlike the Athdara. Constructions on the upper-stories of the Athdara and Shish Mahal sections were the private-residence of the Maharaja, however his bedroom located on the upper-floors has since collapsed.

== Conservation ==
The ceiling of the structure had been neglected and was in immediate-danger of collapse. In January 2026, a restored Athdara pavilion was reopened. The Sikh-era Hammam (behind the Athdara) and Loh Temple were also restored. The restoration was carried-out by the Walled City of Lahore Authority and the Aga Khan Cultural Service Pakistan with financial support from the United States government.

== Gallery ==
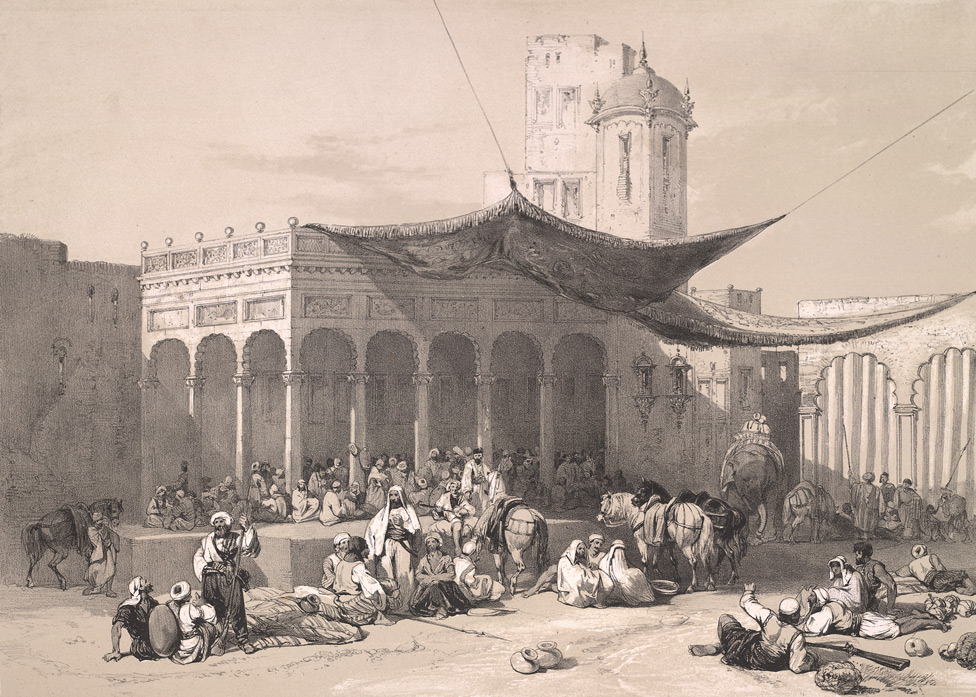
1846–47

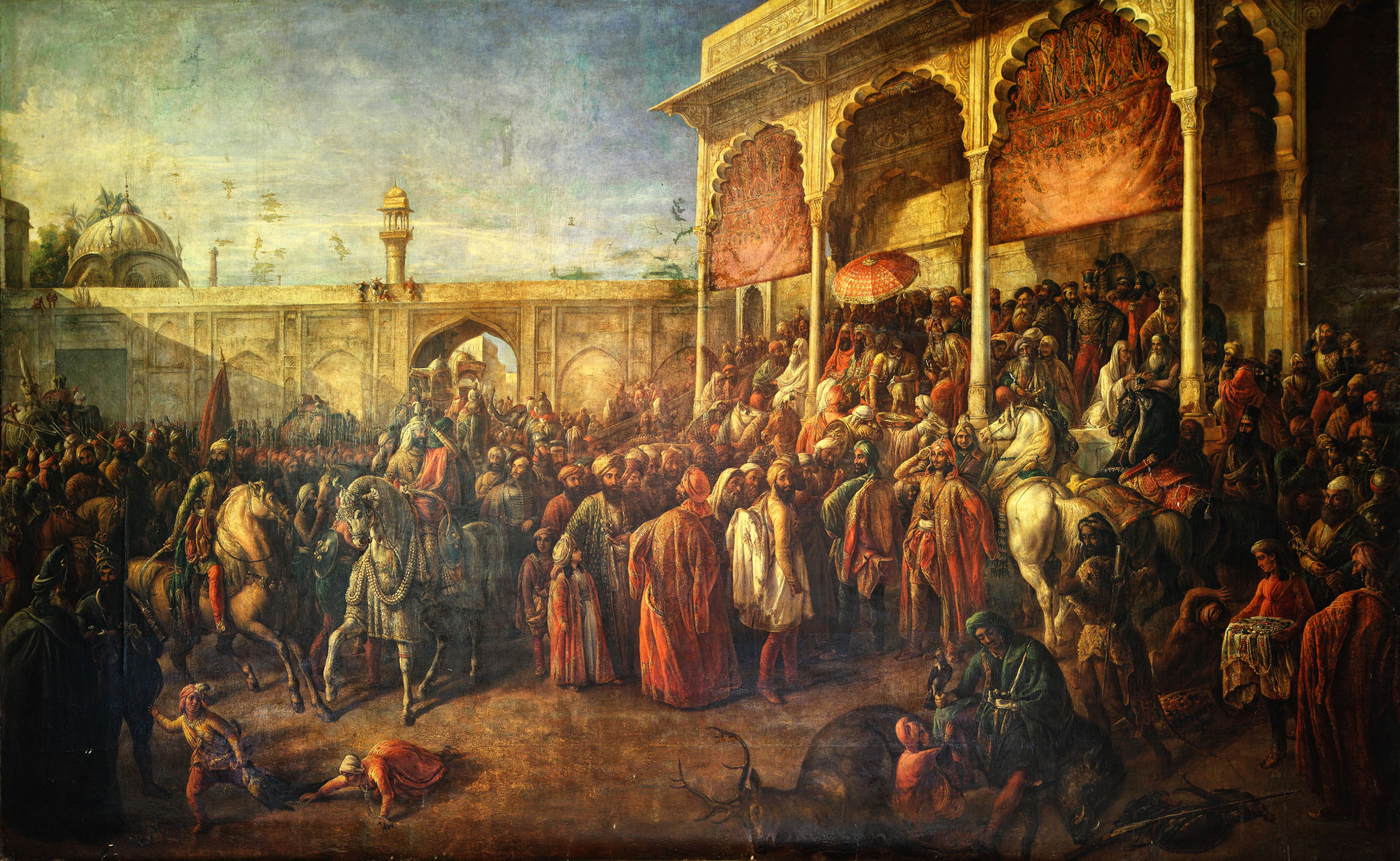
'The Court of Lahore', by August Schoefft, ca.1840's–1855, Vienna, after drawings made at Lahore, ca.1841–55

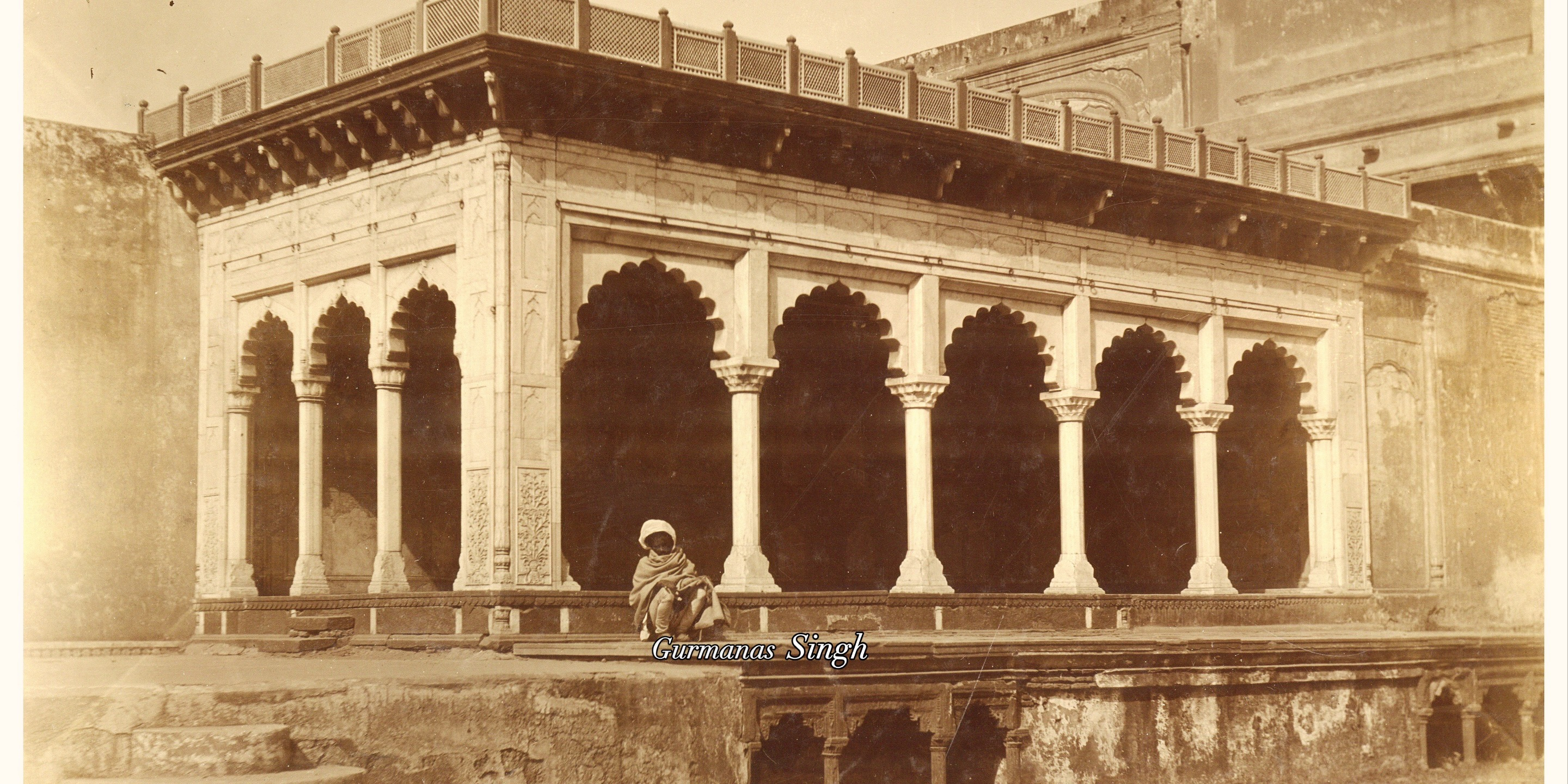
1902

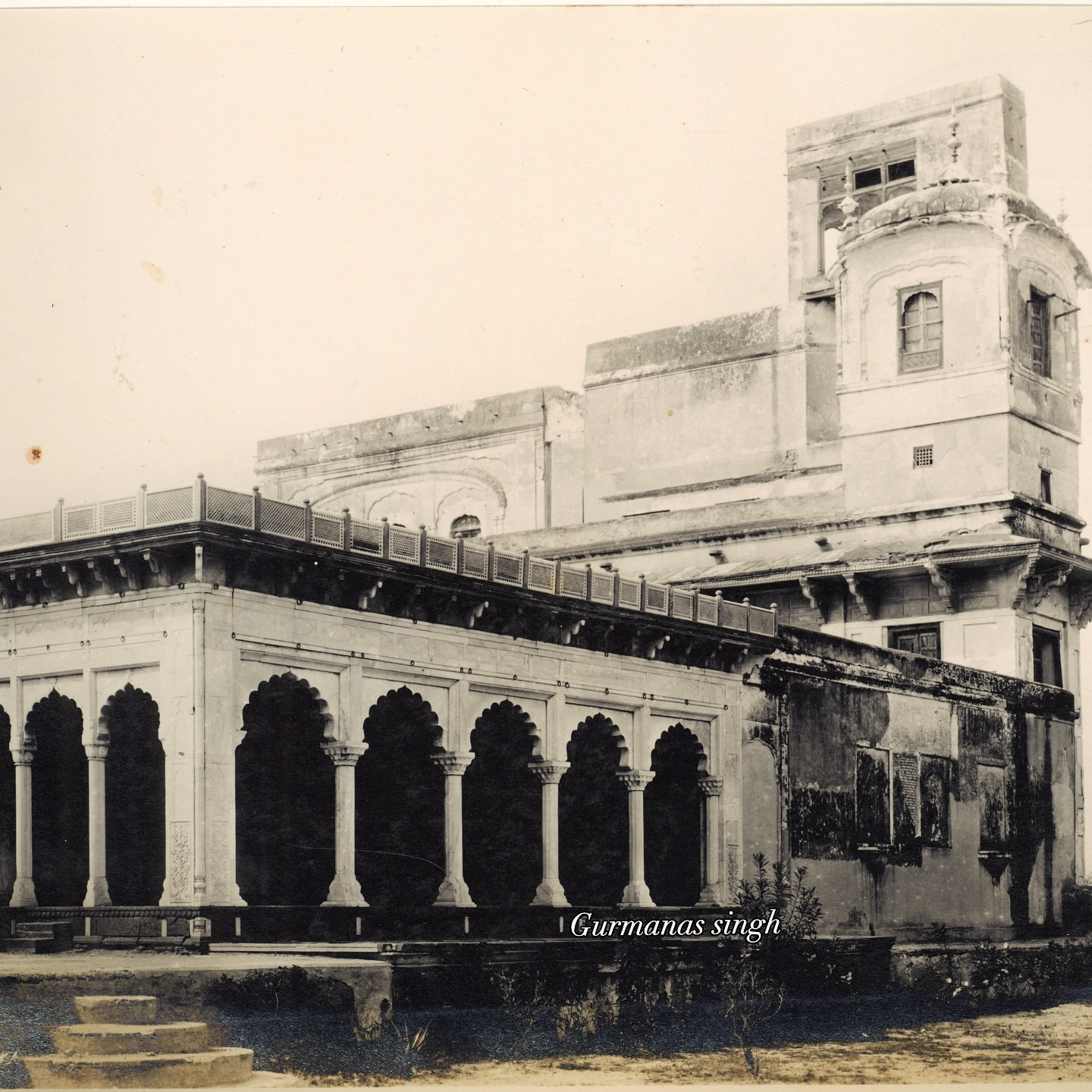
1925

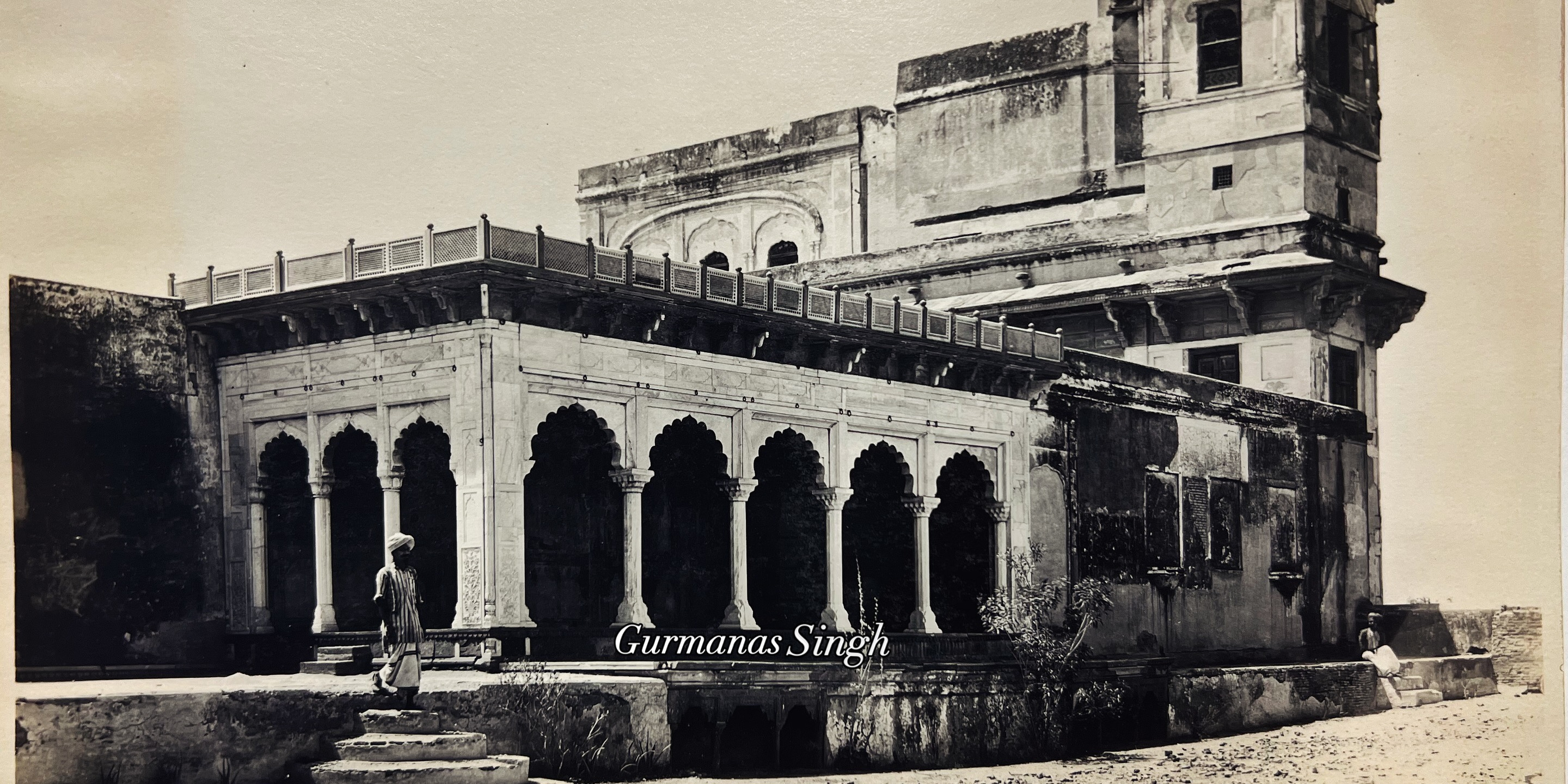
1927

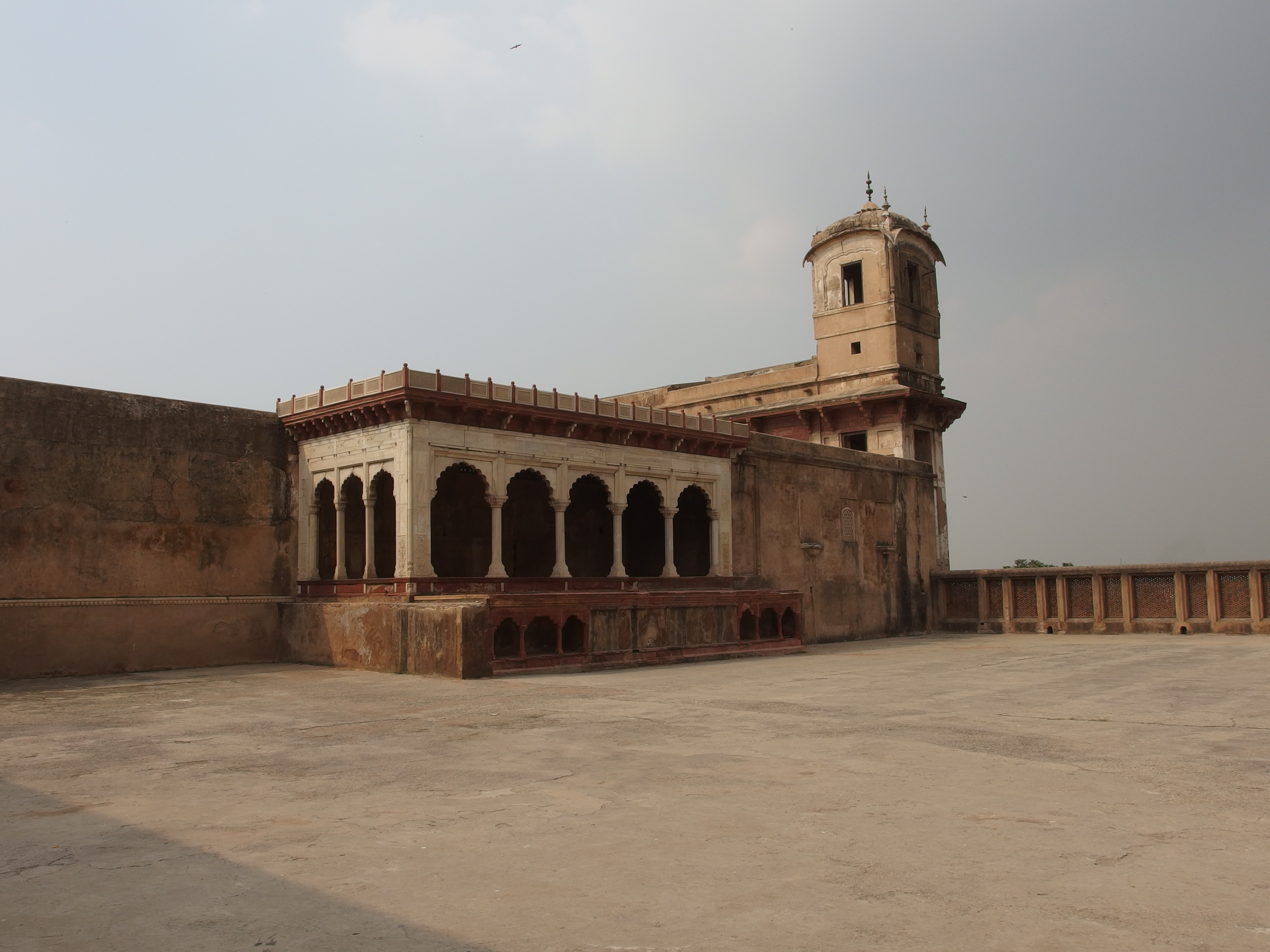
2014

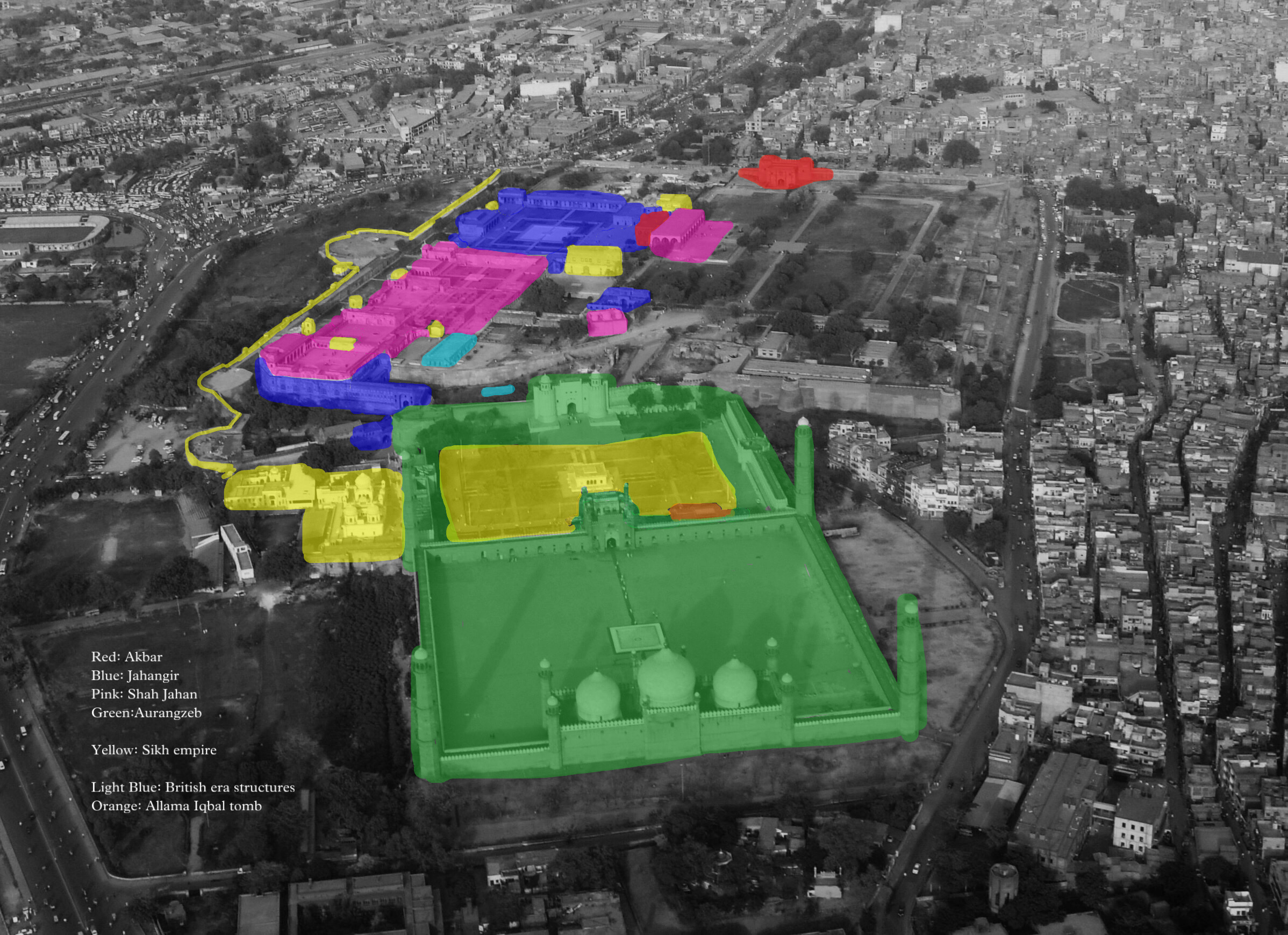
Timeline of Lahore Fort and related monuments

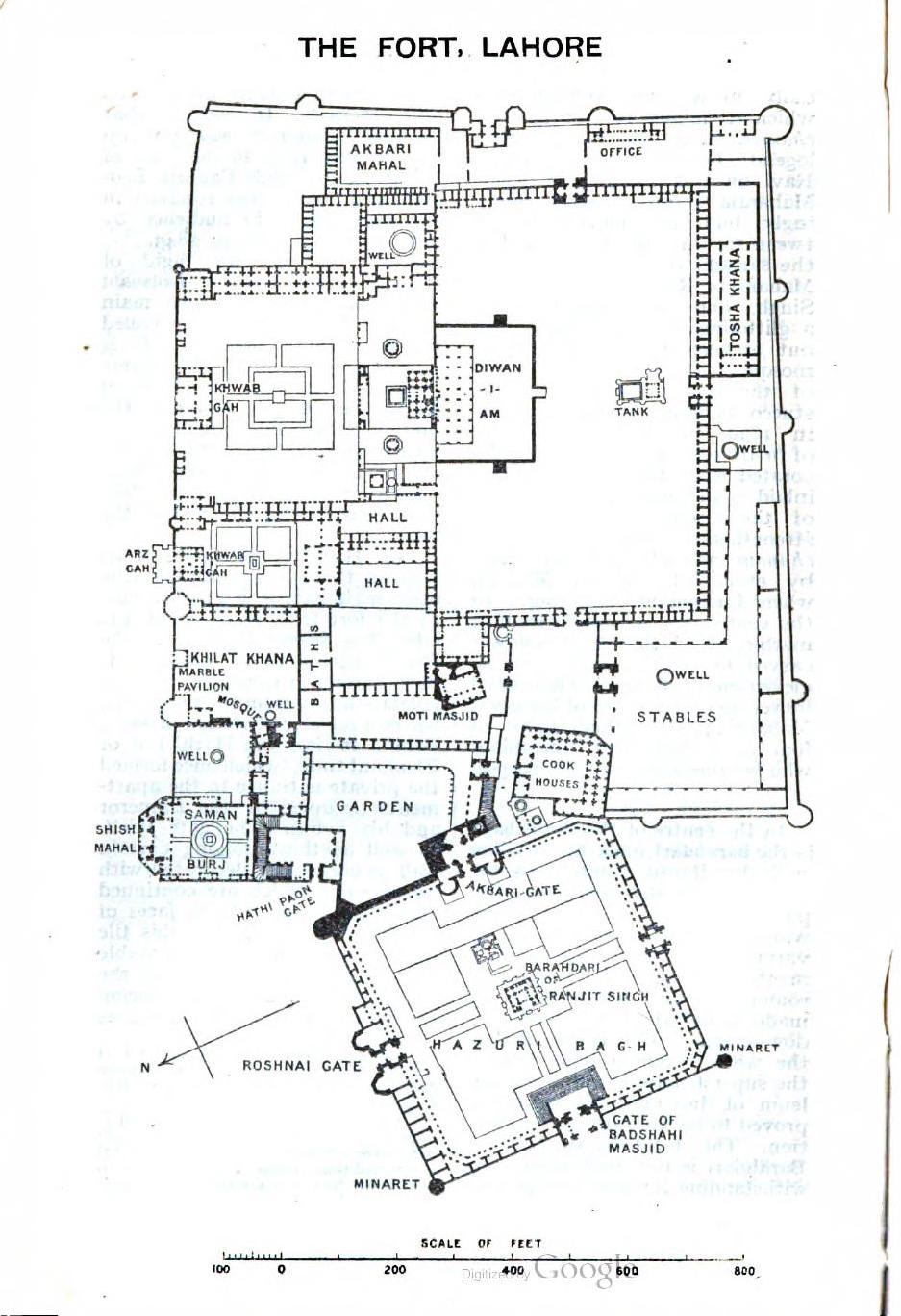
Map of Lahore Fort in Lahore, Punjab, British India, published in 'A Handbook for Travellers in India, Burma and Ceylon' (10th ed., reprint, 1920)

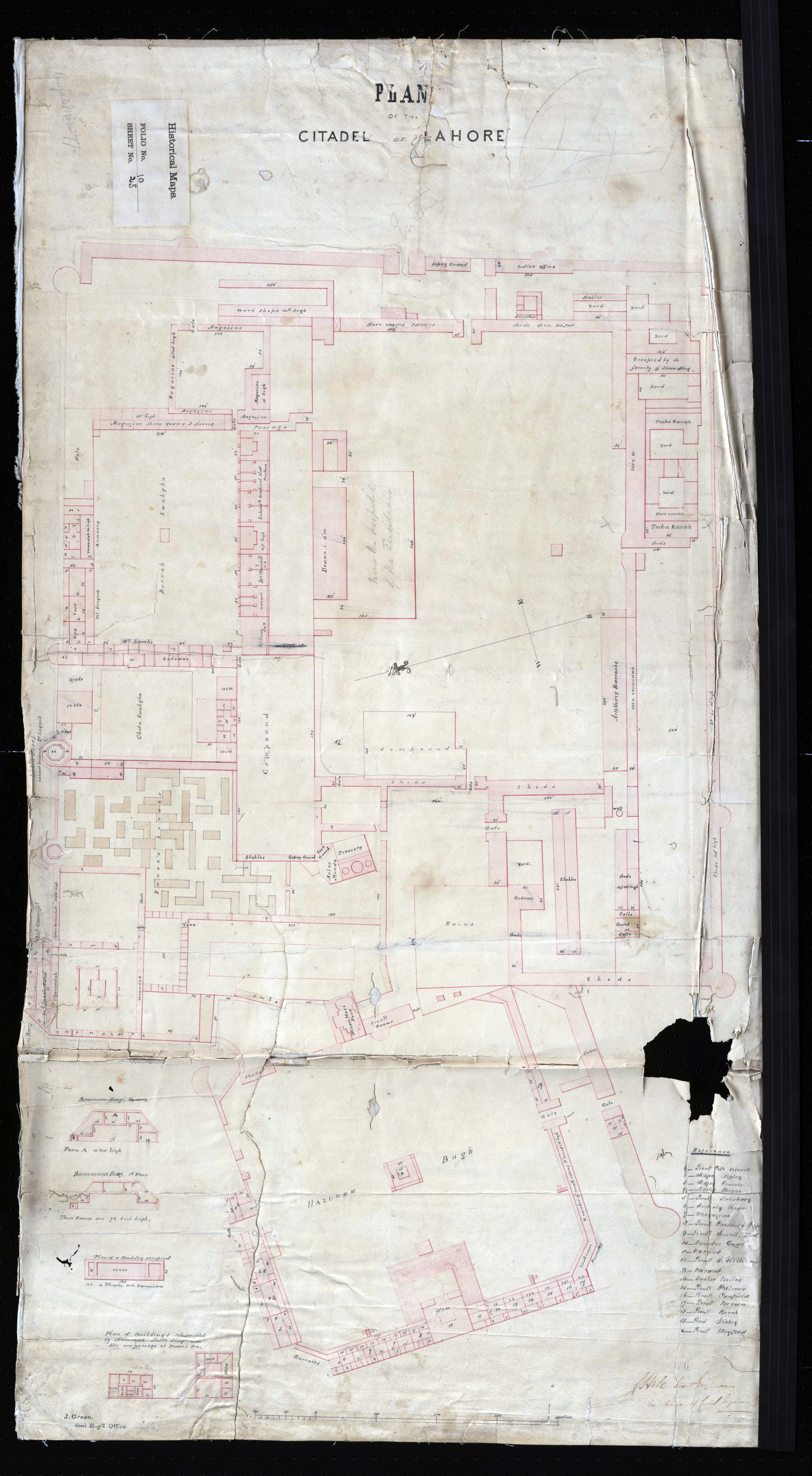
Plan map of the citadel of Lahore, by C. J. Hill
