= Neevin Mosque =

Mosque in Lahore, Punjab, Pakistan

- نیویں مسیت
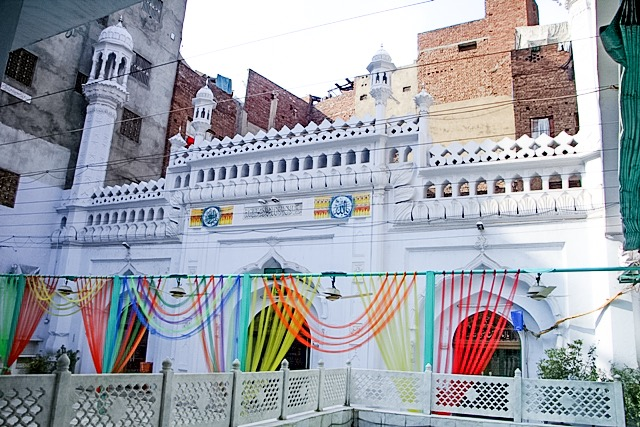

Religion
- Affiliation: Islam

Location
- Location: Punjab, Pakistan
- Interactive map of Neevin Mosque

Architecture
- Type: Mosque
- Style: Indo-Islamic, Lodi
- Completed: 1460 C.E.

Specifications
- Dome: 3
- Materials: Brick

Jamia Karimia Mosque (Urdu: جامعہ کریمیہ مسجد), also known as the Neevin Mosque, or Neevin Masjid (Punjabi: نیویں مسیت, romanised: Nīvī̃ Masīt, lit. 'The low [lying] mosque'), is a 15th-century mosque built during the Lodi dynasty of the Delhi Sultanate. It is located in the ancient Walled City of Lahore, in Pakistan's Punjab province. It is notable for its foundation 25 feet below street level. The mosque is further noted for being one of Lahore's few remaining pre-Mughal monuments.

== Location ==
Neevin Mosque is situated within the Walled City of Lahore along a small street named Kucha Dogran. The mosque is located near the historic Lohari Gate, and the Chowk Matti square.

== History ==
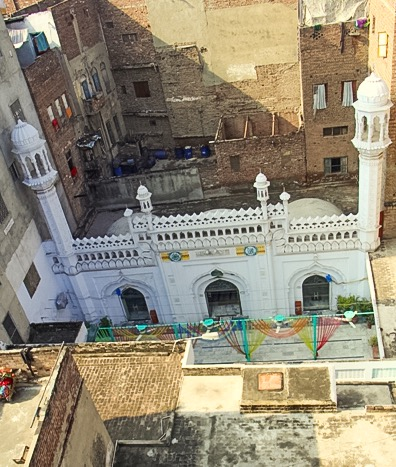
The mosque is unusual in that its prayer hall is below street level.

While Lahore is widely known for its Mughal-era monuments, Naveen Mosque is believed to have been built in 1460 CE by the Lodi dynasty under the rule of its first king, Bahlul Lodi. The dynasty was founded in Multan in Pakistan's Punjab province, though the founders were of Pashtun extraction. The mosque is believed to have been built by Zulfiqar Khan, who served under Lahore's governor, Haybat Khan.

Unlike the Badshahi Mosque, Sunehri Mosque, and Mariyam Zamani Mosque which were desecrated under Sikh rule, these were later returned for Islamic worship following representations made by the Muslim community to Ranjit Singh. Neevin Mosque remained untouched. It also was not greatly altered in appearance under Sikh and British rule, although its minarets had to be rebuilt following an earthquake in the early 1900s.

== Architecture ==
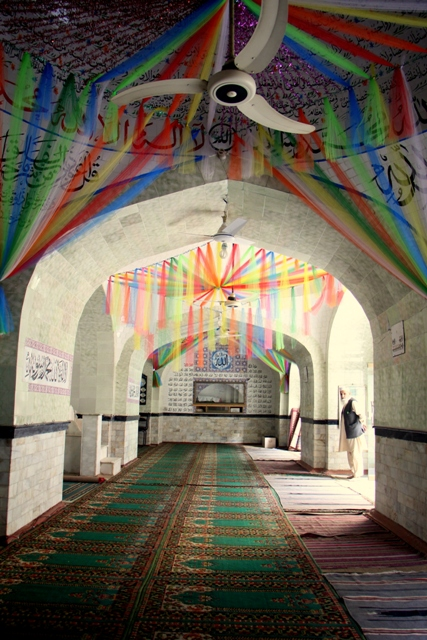
A view of the mosque's interior

From the mosque's entrance on the street, visitors must descend a staircase to access the mosque's prayer hall. The mosque's unusual foundation below street level is atypical for Lahore's other mosques, although at one time there were two such mosques - the other near Yakki Gate was rebuilt in the 20th century and is now at street-level. In contrast to usual mosque construction, Hindu temples are sometimes built with subterranean vaults and chambers, leading to speculation that the mosque could have possibly been built upon the remains of an earlier Hindu temple.

The mosque's prayer hall can accommodate approximately 100 worshippers, and is divided into three roughly equally-sized sections. Each section features a short dome typical of the Lodi-style, as well as an archway that opens onto the mosque's central courtyard.

== Administration ==
The mosque is run by the local community under the leadership of an Imam.
