= Kashmiri Gate, Lahore =

One of thirteen gates in the Walled City of Lahore, Pakistan

- کشمیری بُوہا (Punjabi) کشمیری دروازه (Urdu)
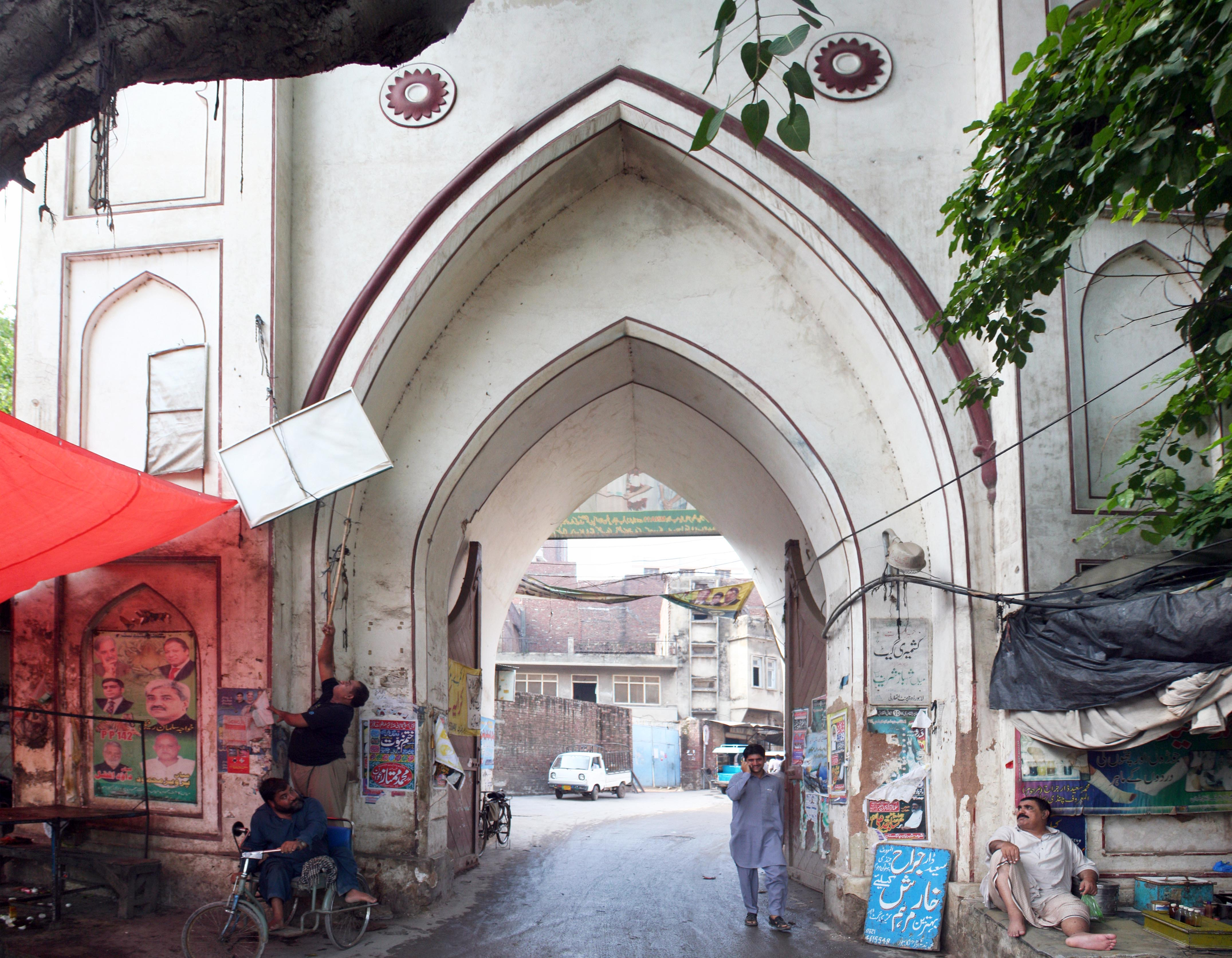
- The façade of Kashmiri Gate, Walled city of Old Lahore, Lahore, Pakistan
- Interactive map of Kashmiri Gate, Lahore
- Location: Walled City of Lahore, Lahore, Pakistan
- Coordinates: 31.5868°N 74.321°E
- Type: City gate

Kashmiri Gate, Lahore (Punjabi: کشمیری بُوہا, romanized: Kaśmīrī Būhā; Urdu: کشمیری دروازه, romanized: Kaśmīrī Darwāzāh) is one of the thirteen gates of Walled City of Lahore in Lahore, Punjab, Pakistan. The gate gets its name as it faces in the direction of Kashmir.

Kashmiri Gate is one of the thirteen city gates that gave access to the walled Lahore city from all sides. They were all originally built during Mughal emperor Akbar's era (1556-1605) for the city's protection and to regulate the inward and outward movement of goods and people.

Inside Kashmiri Gate, there is a shopping area and market called "Kashmiri Bazaar", known for inexpensive women's formal dresses, dopattas, clothes and footwear. A girls' college

Next to Kashmiri Bazaar is Gayan Singh's Haveli, also called Asif Jah's Haveli, a beautiful example of Mughal architecture. The building now houses a girls' college, Government Fatima Jinnah College for Women.

== Kashmiri Gate conservation project ==
It was reported in the Pakistani news media that the Walled City of Lahore Authority (WCLA) has completed the conservation and renovation project of the Kashmiri Gate in October 2024. Historically, traders and merchants coming from Kashmir entered Lahore from this gate.

Director General of the Walled City of Lahore Authority (WCLA), Kamran Lashari, reportedly said:

"Recognizing the historical importance of the gates of the walled city, our institution prioritizes their preservation. Kashmiri Gate, which once facilitated vibrant commercial exchanges, stands out as a heritage landmark. The Walled City of Lahore Authority (WCLA) is dedicated to ensuring that this gate's historical essence is preserved for visitors and future generations to explore".

== Gallery ==
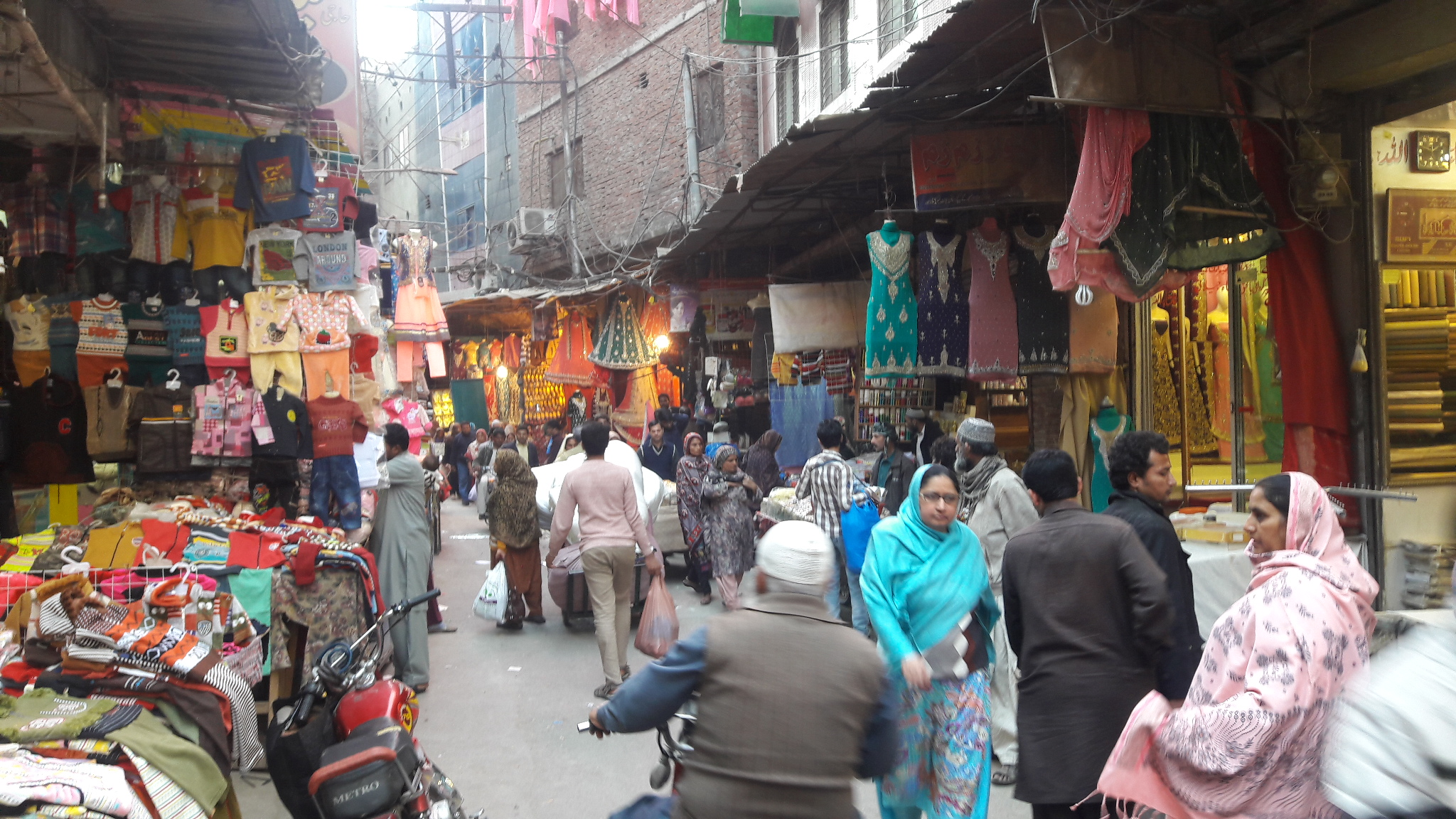
The gate leads to the Kashmiri Bazaar

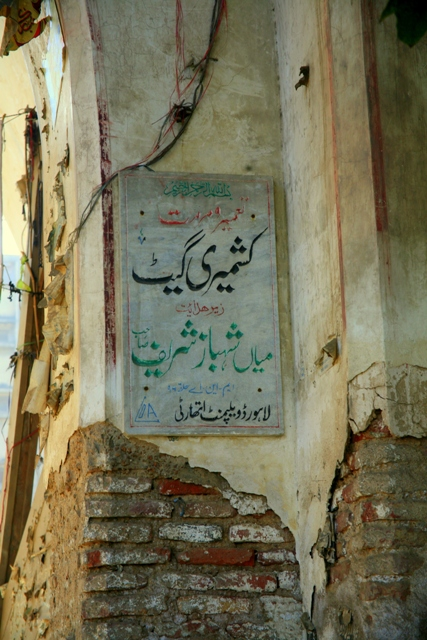
Placard on the gate

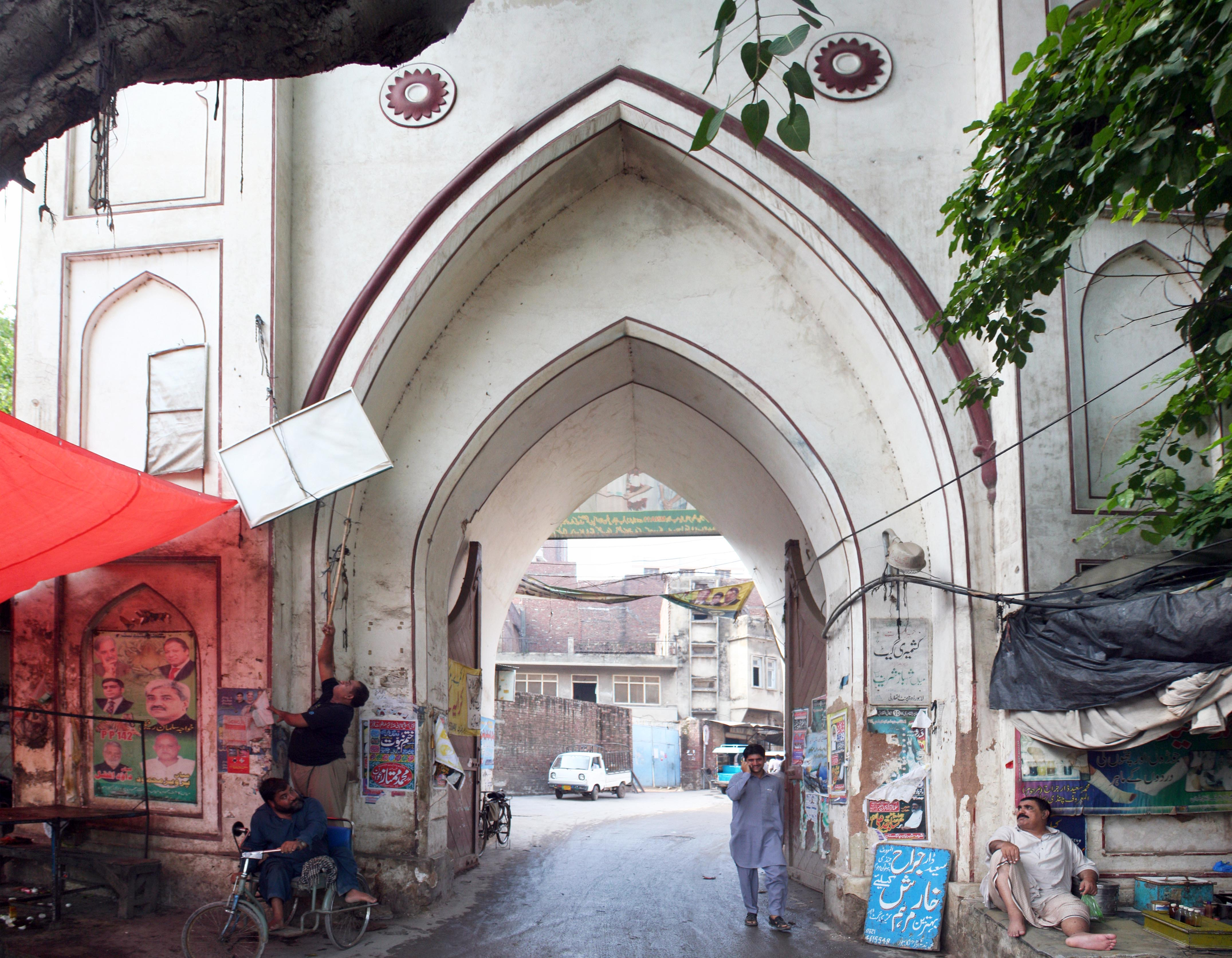
The gate features a wide portal

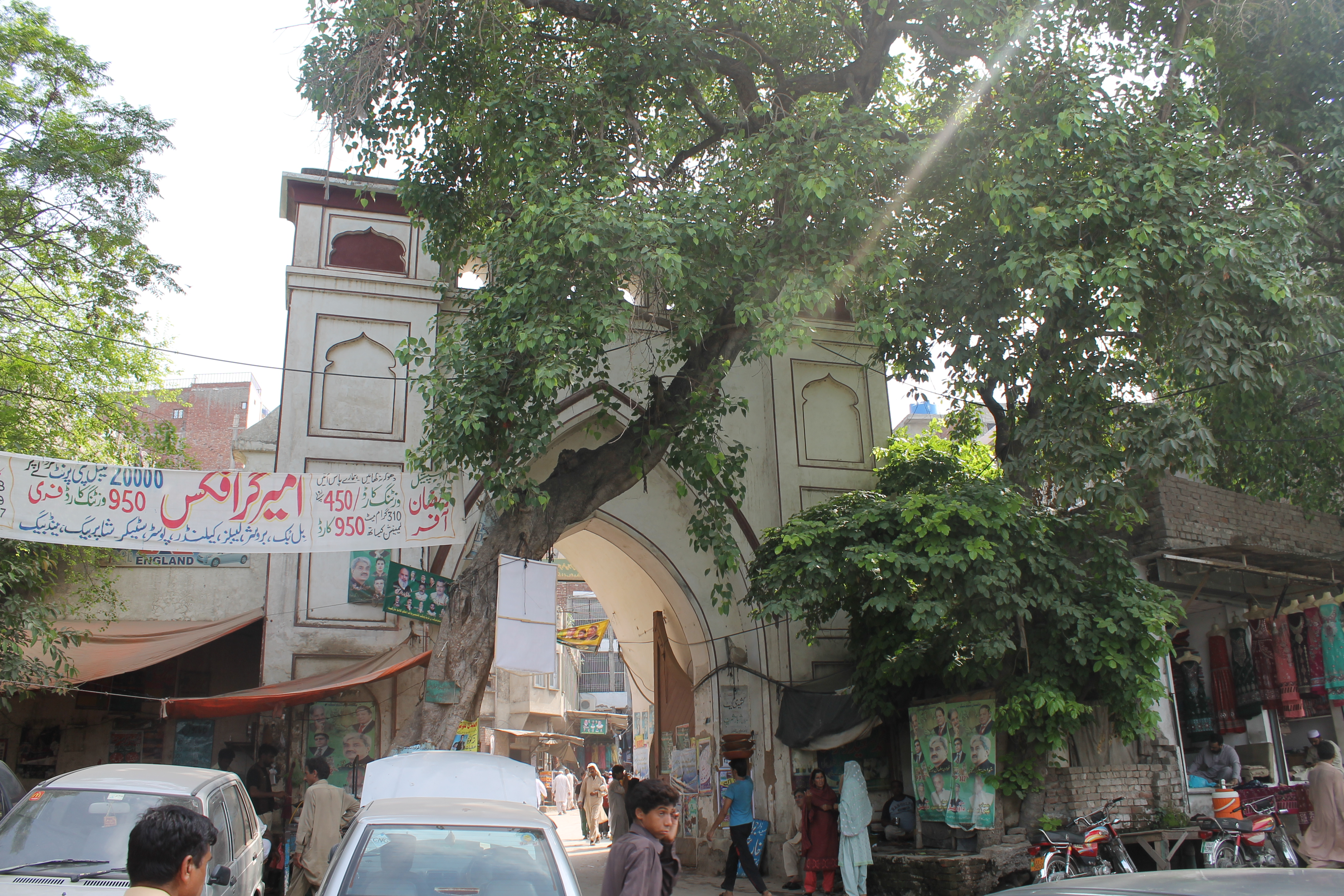
The façade is obscured by a large tree

== See also ==
- Lahore
- Lahore Fort
- Walled City of Lahore
- Badshahi Mosque
