= Barkat Ali Islamia Hall =

- Interactive map of the Barkat Ali Islamia Hall area
- Former names: Mohammedan Hall

General information
- Type: Assembly hall
- Architectural style: Indo-Saracenic
- Location: Circular Road, near Mochi Gate, Lahore, Punjab, Pakistan
- Coordinates: 31.57592°N 74.32244°E
- Named for: Khan Bahadur Muhammad Barkat Ali Khan
- Construction started: 1888
- Completed: 1888
- Renovated: 2023–2024
- Owner: Auqaf Department
- Operator: Walled City of Lahore Authority

Design and construction
- Architect: Mistri Manga
- Developer: Anjuman-i-Himayat-i-Islam

Barkat Ali Islamia Hall, formerly known as Mohammedan Hall, is a historic building located on Circular Road near Mochi Gate in Lahore, Pakistan. It served as a focal point for political gatherings, particularly for the Muslim League after the Lahore Resolution in March 1940. Despite suffering from issues like encroachment and neglect, the hall has been preserved by the Walled City of Lahore Authority and is currently under the ownership of the Auqaf Department.

The hall is named after Khan Bahadur Muhammad Barkat Ali Khan, whose family originated from Afghanistan and settled in the region during the reign of Emperor Shah Jehan in the 17th century. Barkat Ali Khan's career began in 1847, and he was active during the Sikh War of 1848. His career progressed as he was promoted through various administrative roles, eventually being honored with the title of Khan Bahadur in 1868.

After retiring in 1882, Khan became actively involved in public service, particularly with the Anjuman-i-Himayat-i-Islam and the Indian Association. His initiatives led to the construction of the Mohammedan Hall in 1888, intended to promote Islamic values and cultural activities, which was later named Barkat Ali Islamia Hall.
