= Lohari Gate, Lahore =

Residential neighbourhood locality in Lahore, Pakistan

Coordinates: 31.57735°N 74.31338°E

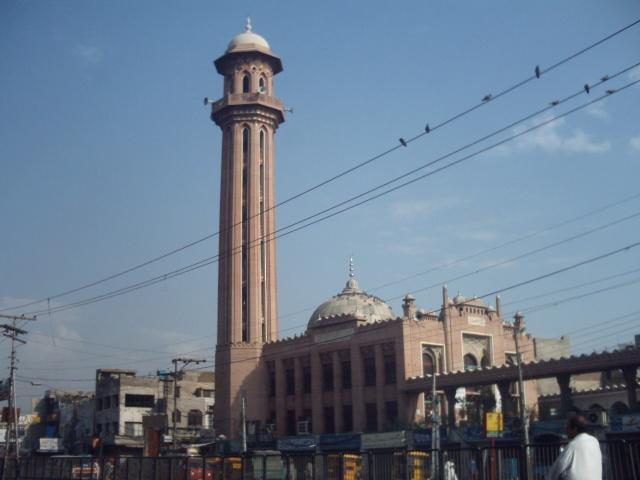
Lahori Gate Mosque

The Lahori Gate, also known as Lohari Gate, is one of the 13 gates located within the Walled City of Lahore, Punjab, Pakistan.

Lahori Gate or Ggte is one of the oldest gates of the old city. According to some historians, the old city of Lahore was originally located near Ichhra, and this gate opened towards that direction. Hence the name, Lahori gate. The other name Lohar means blacksmith in the Urdu language. This gate was named after the Lohar (blacksmith) community of craftsmen who made objects primarily from iron or steel. This could also be another reason behind naming it this way.

== Lahori Market ==
The bazar inside Lohari Gate is known as Lohari Mandi (Lohari Market) which is one of the oldest markets of South Asia. In the distant past, caravans and travelers coming from Multan used to enter the city from this gate. According to historians, behind Lohari Gate, once stood a brick fort called Kacha Kot which was probably the first fortified city of Lahore founded by Malik Ayaz.

During the Mughal rule, the two famous divisions of the Walled City, namely Guzar Bahar Khan and Guzar Machhi Hatta, were connected by this gate. During the anarchic rule of the 18th century, all the city gates, except Lohari Gate along with two other gates were walled up. Lohari Gate was rebuilt in 1864 by Sir Robert Montgomery, the then Governor of Punjab. The Walled City of Lahore Authority completed the renovation of Lohari Gate in late 2024.

== See also ==
- Lahore
- Lahore Fort
- Walled City of Lahore
- Badshahi Mosque
