= Roshnai Gate =

One of the historic gates of the Walled City of Lahore, Pakistan

- روشنائی دروازہ
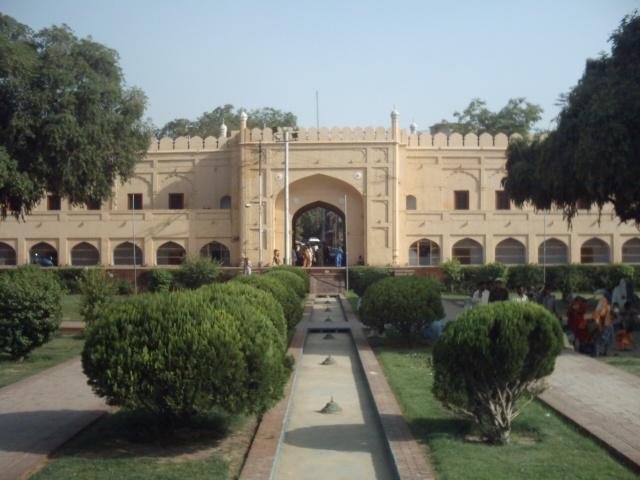
- The gate faces the Hazuri Bagh quadrangle
- Interactive map of Roshnai Gate
- Location: Lahore, Punjab, Pakistan
- Coordinates: 31.58769°N 74.31197°E
- Type: City gate

Roshnai Gate (Persian: دروازه روشنایی,Urdu: روشنائی دروازہ, lit. 'Gate of Lights') is one of the thirteen gates within the Walled City of Lahore in Lahore, Punjab, Pakistan. It was the main entry into Lahore for emperors and nobles during the Mughal, and later Sikh period.

Its extended height and width is testament to its use by emperors' caravans of elephants. Since the Ravi River once flowed alongside the northern wall of the Lahore Fort and the Badshahi Mosque, the gate was profusely illuminated at night to aid travelers. It is for this reason that the gate has been named as “Roshnai Darwaza” or the “gate of light”. It is considered to be the oldest of Lahore's gates, and the only gate that has been preserved in its original shape.

== Gallery ==
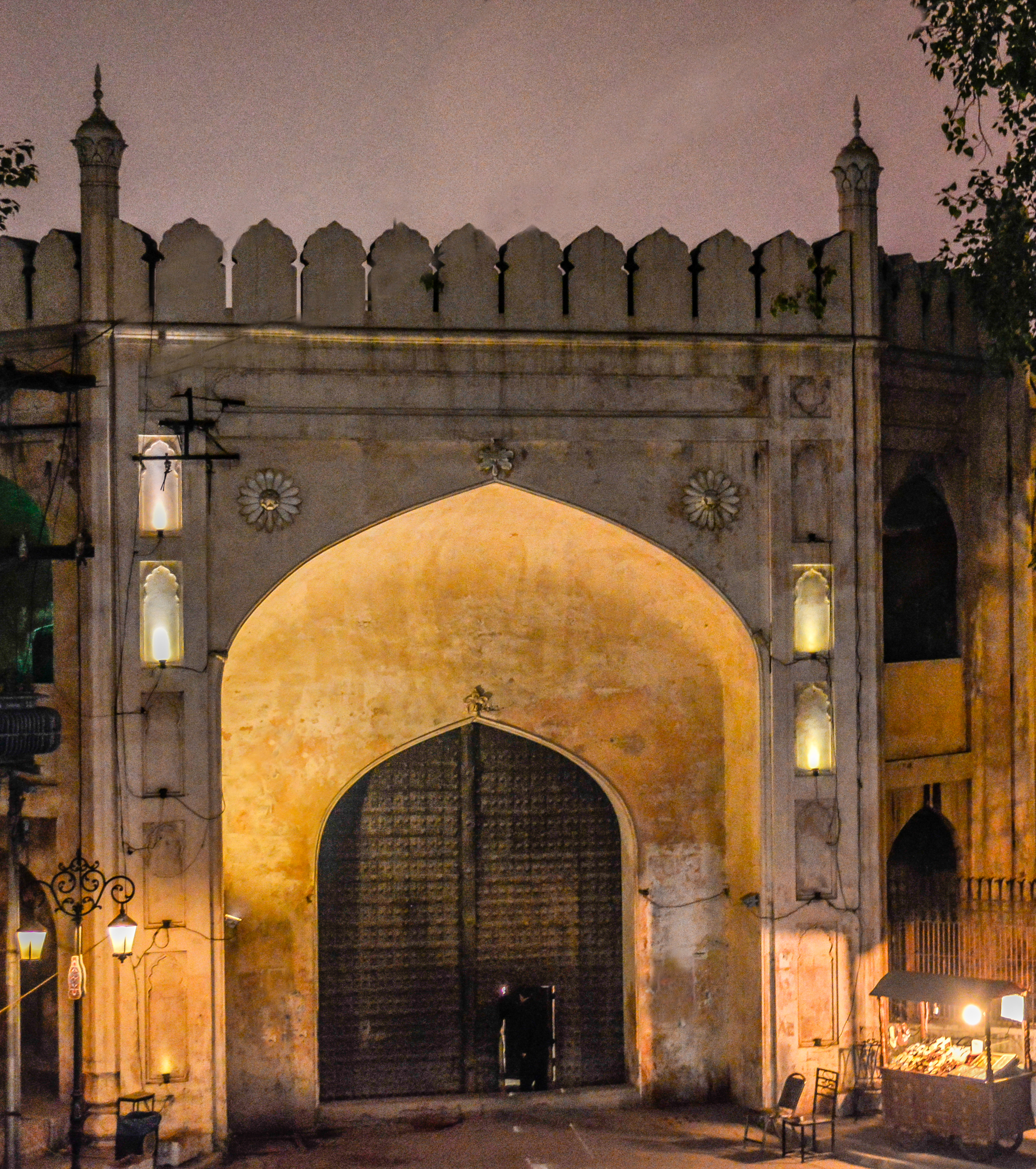
View of the gate

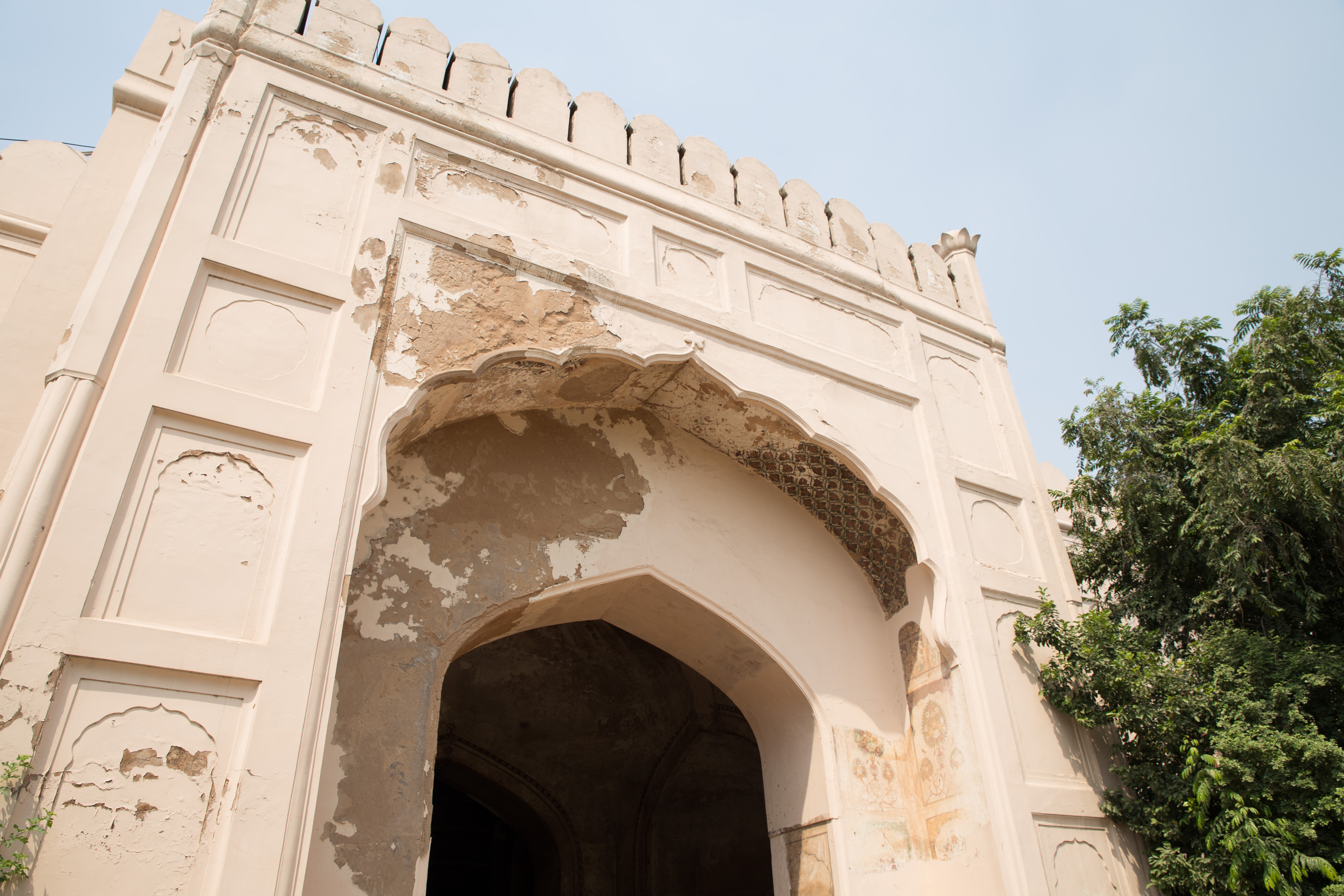

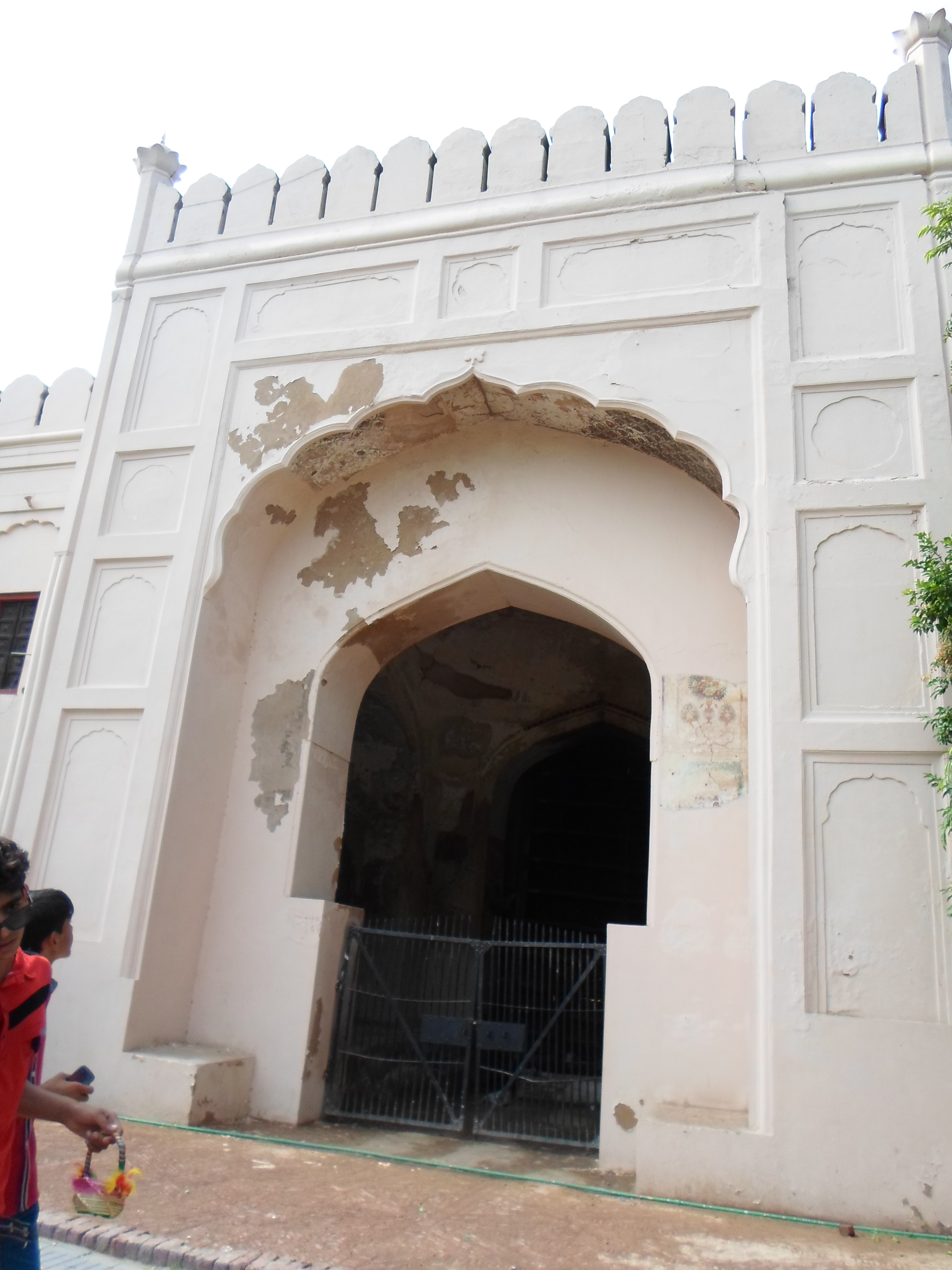

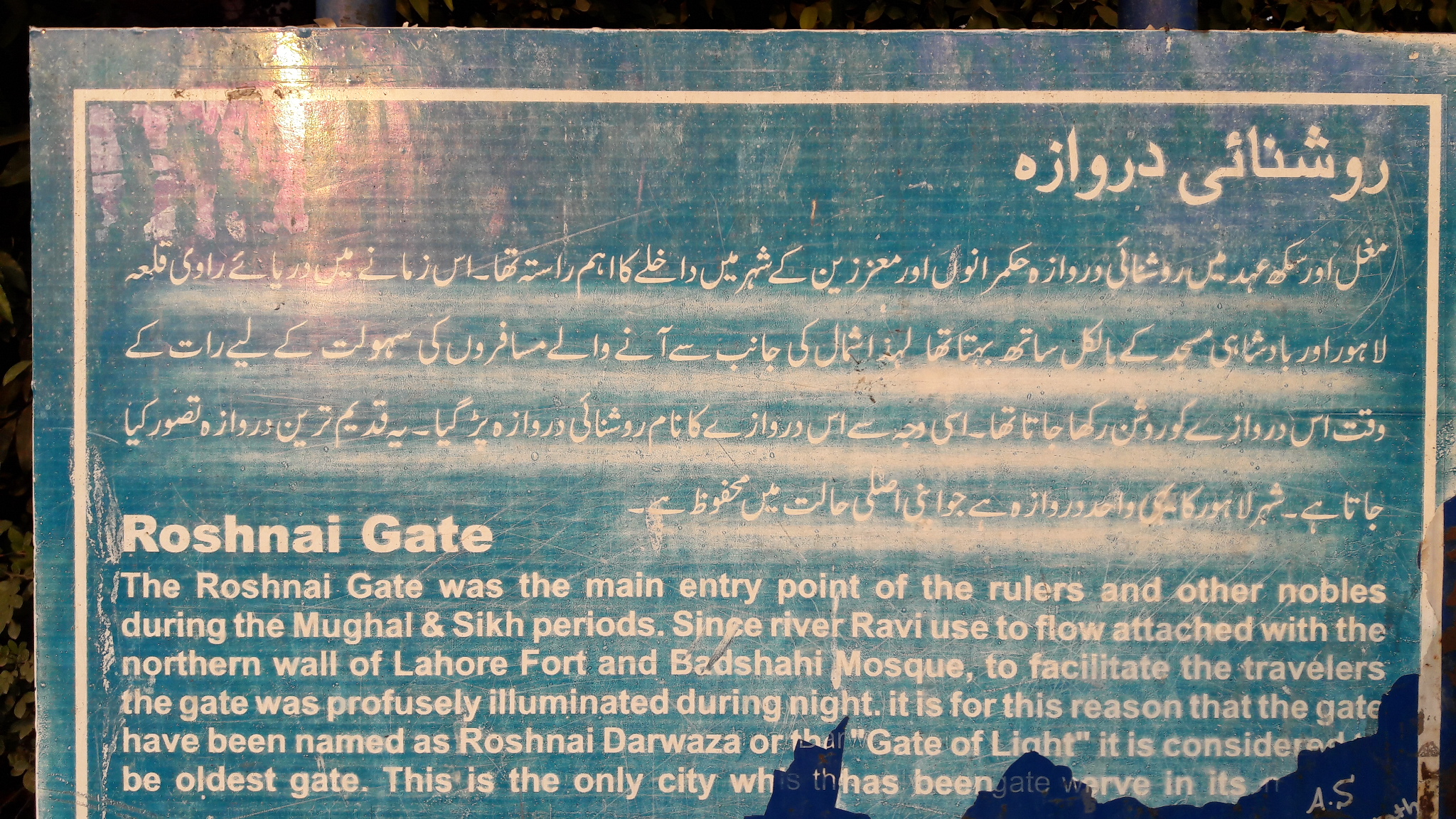

== See also ==
- Lahore
- Lahore Fort
- Walled City of Lahore
- Badshahi Mosque
