= Walled City of Lahore =

Inner historic core of Lahore, Punjab, Pakistan

Walled City of Lahore اندرون شہر لہور (Punjabi) اندرونِ شہر لاہور (Urdu)
- Locality
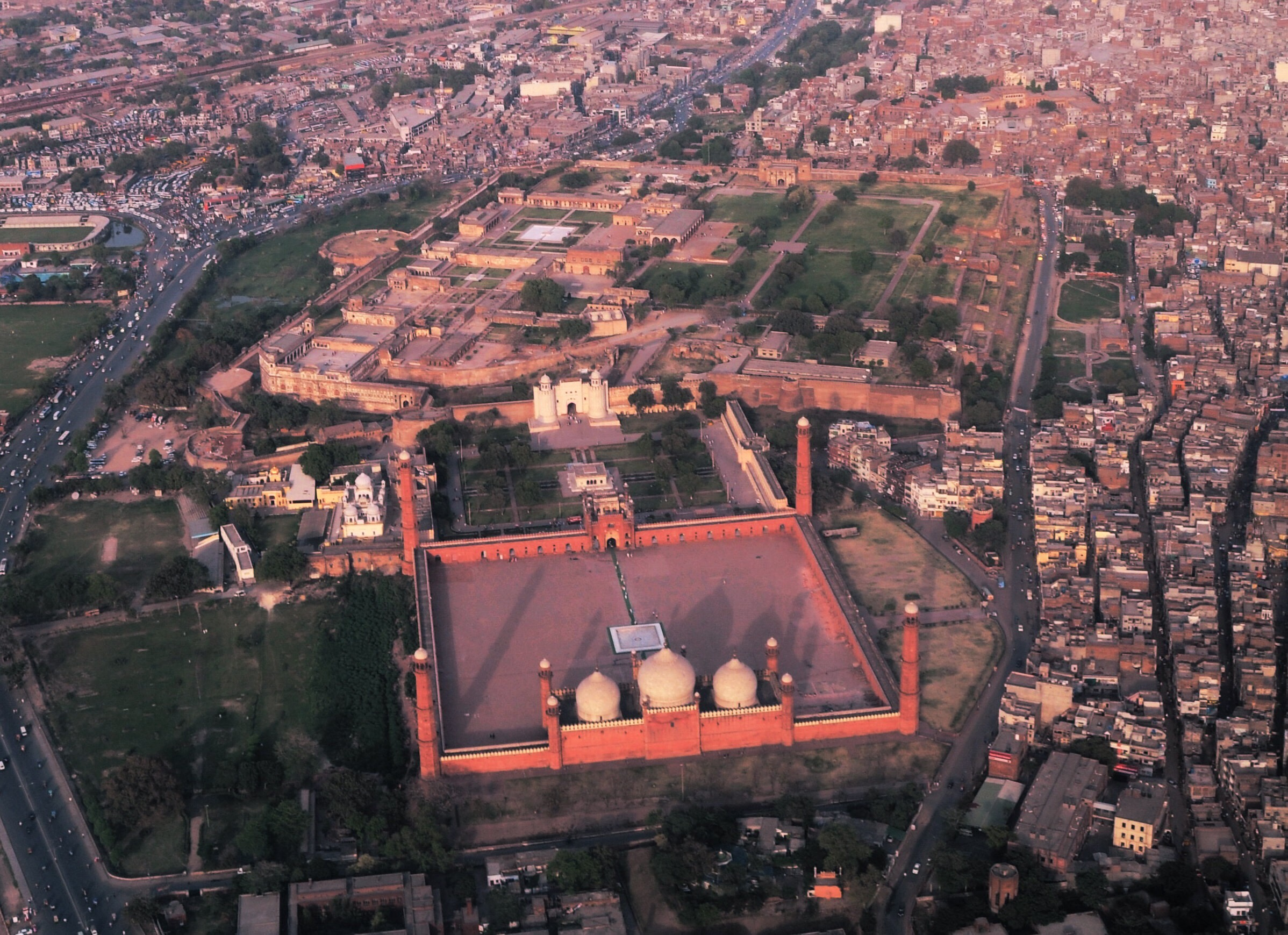
- Hazuri Bagh as a quadrangle at the centre of an ensemble of monuments in the Walled City

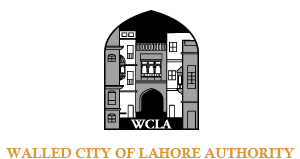
- Seal

- Location within Lahore Location within the province of Punjab Location within Pakistan
- Coordinates: 31°35′00″N 74°19′06″E
- Country: Pakistan
- Province: Punjab
- City: Lahore
- Tehsil: Lahore City
- Union Councils: UC-27, UC-28, UC-29, UC-30

The Walled City of Lahore, (Note: Punjabi: اندرون شہر لہور, romanised: andrūn śahar lahaur; Urdu: اندرونِ شہر لاہور, romanised: andrūn śêhr lāhor; lit. 'Inner City of Lahore') also known as the Old City or Inner Lahore, refers to the historic core of Lahore, the capital and largest city of Punjab, Pakistan. The early settlements were established between the 1st and 7th centuries, with Lahore attaining the status of a proper city in 1040 which was fortified throughout the medieval era. It has been the primary cultural centre of the Punjab since the late-medieval era.

The Walled City rose in prominence after being selected as the Mughal capital, which resulted in the construction of the Lahore Fort – now a UNESCO World Heritage Site, as well as the city's new reinforced walls. The Walled City was bestowed with numerous monuments during the Mughal era, with some of Lahore's most iconic structures being located in the Walled City, such as the lavishly decorated Wazir Khan Mosque, the massive Badshahi Mosque, and the Shahi Hammam. Under Sikh rule, the city was again selected as the capital, and the Walled City again rose in prominence with numerous religious buildings built in the Walled City at the time, including the Samadhi of Ranjit Singh, and the Gurdwara Janam Asthan Guru Ram Das.

The Walled City today remains the cultural heart of Lahore, and is home to many of its tourist attractions. In 2012, the Pilot Urban Conservation and Infrastructure Improvement Project—the Shahi Guzargah Project was launched to restore a section of Shahi Guzargah ("Royal Passage") between the Wazir Khan Mosque and Delhi Gate under the management of the Walled City of Lahore Authority. The first phase of the project was completed in 2015 with support from the governments of Norway and the United States of America.

== History ==
=== Founding ===
The origins of Lahore are vague. According to carbon dating evidence from archaeological finds in the Lahore Fort, settlements in the region have existed as early as 2,000 BCE. Lahore had many names throughout its history. Mohallah Maulian represents one of the two most probable sites of first the original Lahore.

=== Medieval period ===
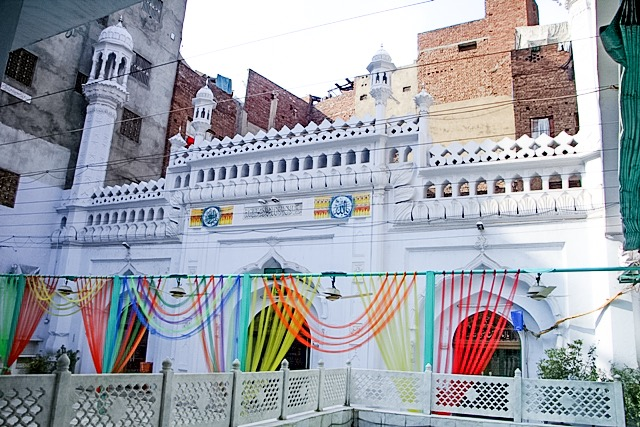
The Neevin Mosque is one of Lahore's few remaining medieval era buildings.

Though the modern city's founding may have been as early as 1000 CE, Lahore gained prominence only with the invasion of Muslim rulers from Central Asia. The city served as a capital during the Ghaznavid, Ghorid, and Delhi Sultanate periods, but was not widely mentioned until around 1400. Ibn Battuta knew of the city, but chose not to visit it, while Tamerlane spared the city destruction in his 1398 invasion, and delegated its sacking to a subordinate.

The entire city of Lahore during the medieval Ghaznavid era was probably located west of the modern Shah Alami, and north of the Bhatti Gate. Many of the city's pre-Mughal tombs were built along the perimeter of this outline, including the Data Darbar shrine, the Tomb of Malik Ayaz, and the Aybak tomb. The modern Gumti Bazaar forms an arc along what may have been the southern boundary of the pre-Mughal city.

=== Mughal period ===
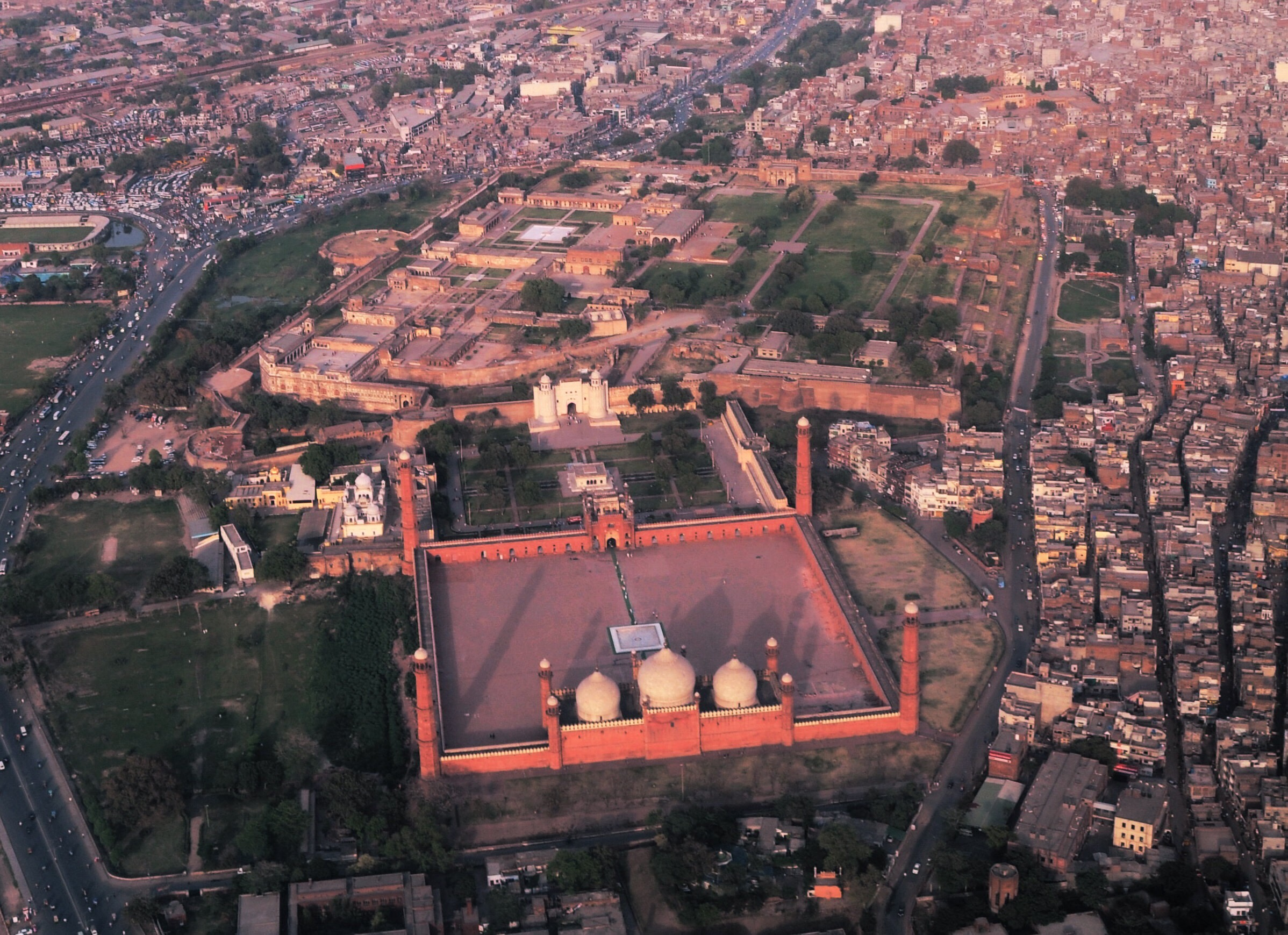
The Walled City's Hazuri Bagh is a quadrangle at the centre of an ensemble of monuments including the Badshahi Mosque, Lahore Fort, Roshnai Gate, and the Samadhi of Ranjit Singh.

By the time of Mughal rule, a majority of its residents did not live within the walled city itself, but instead lived in suburbs that had spread outside of the city's walls. Only 9 of the 36 urban quarters around Lahore, known as guzars, were located within the city's walls during the Akbar period. During this period, Lahore was closely tied to smaller market towns known as qasbahs, such as Kasur, Eminabad, and Batala in modern-day India. These, in turn, linked Lahore's markets to supply chains starting in villages surrounding each qasbah.

Urban administration under the Mughals was minimal, and most streets aside from major thoroughfares were privately maintained. The kotwal was imbued with the responsibility to manage day-to-day affairs in the city, and was subordinate to a Qazi judge. The local Mohalladar would surveil individual mohalla neighbourhoods, and register births and deaths within his mohallah. The positions were also maintained later during Sikh and British rule.

==== Akbar ====
Lahore's eminence largely began after 1584, when the Emperor Akbar ordered a palace to be built at the site where the Lahore Fort now stands, after shifting his capital to Lahore from Fatehpur Sikri. He also ordered rebuilt and fortified the city's walls, and ordered their extension east of the modern Shah Alami Bazaar to encompass an open plain known as the Rarra Maidan. Lahore's old gates were also built around this time. Akbar also established the Akbari Mandi as a grain market at the city's easternmost edge - a grain market that still exists in the present day. During his reign, Mughal nobles were encouraged to build palaces and gardens in and around Lahore, and many of Lahore's first haveli mansions date from this period.

European visitors in the 16th and 17th centuries described the city as populous, with bazaars stocking valuable goods. Akbar's court chronicler, Abu'l-Fazl ibn Mubarak, described the city as a "grand resort of all countries" with manufacturers that produced an astonishing variety of items. The Venetian traveller, Niccolao Manucci, described the city's bazaars as being packed with foreigners.

==== Jahangir ====
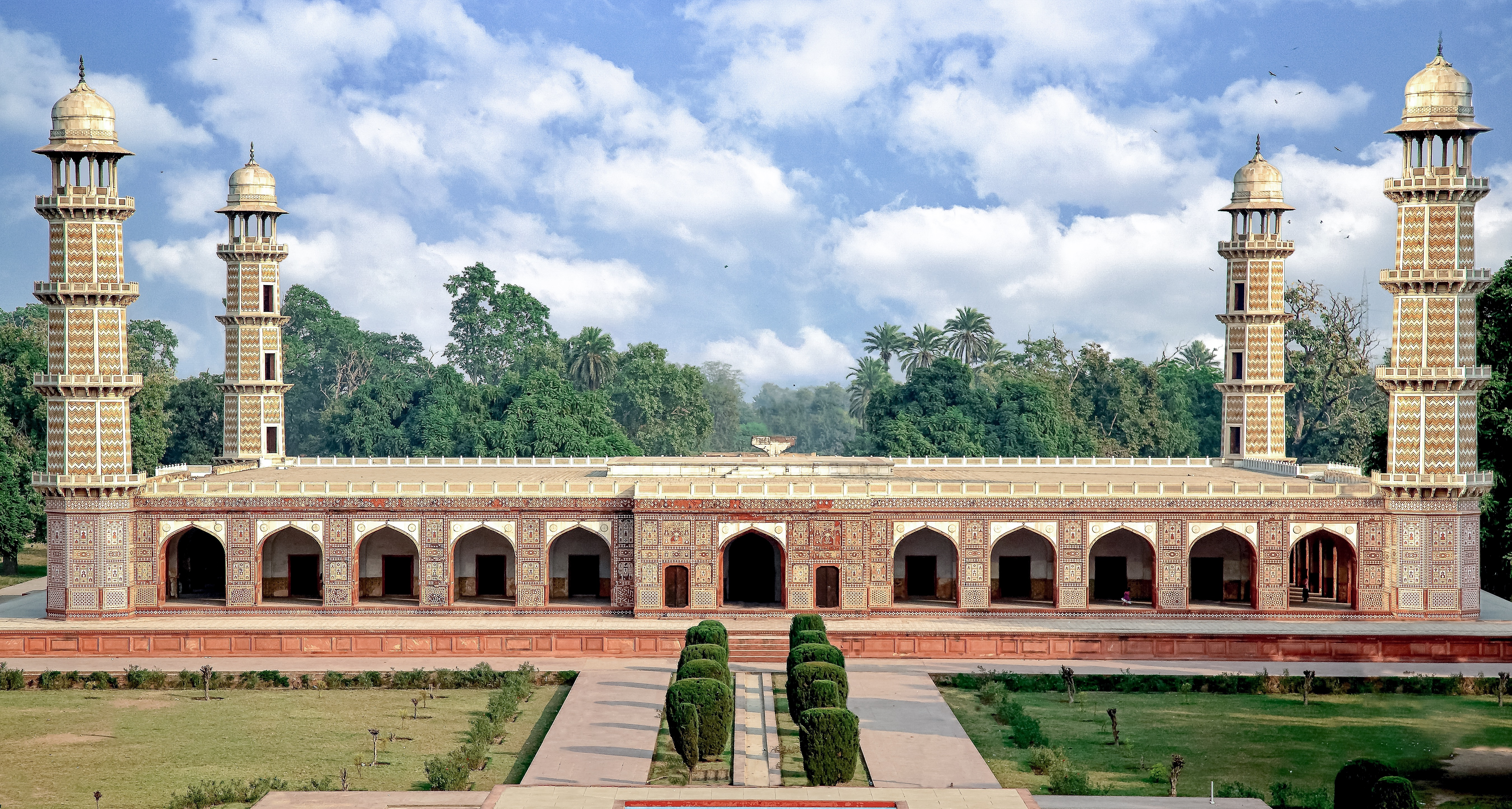
The Tomb of Jahangir was built just outside the Walled City, in an area known as Shahdara Bagh.

During the reign of Emperor Jahangir, Lahore was still considered less important than the old Mughal capital of Agra, as evidenced by the construction of the Tomb of I'timād-ud-Daulah there rather than in Lahore. However, the importance of the city grew drastically with the presence of the Mughal Court, and the city's suburbs spread out more than 5 kilometres beyond the Walled City. The Emperor Jahangir was later buried in an extravagant tomb in the Shahdara Bagh across the River Ravi, whose construction was overseen by his wife, Nur Jahan. The family of Nur Jahan built several garden-residences within and around the Walled City, and was later buried in Shahdara Bagh.

==== Shah Jahan ====
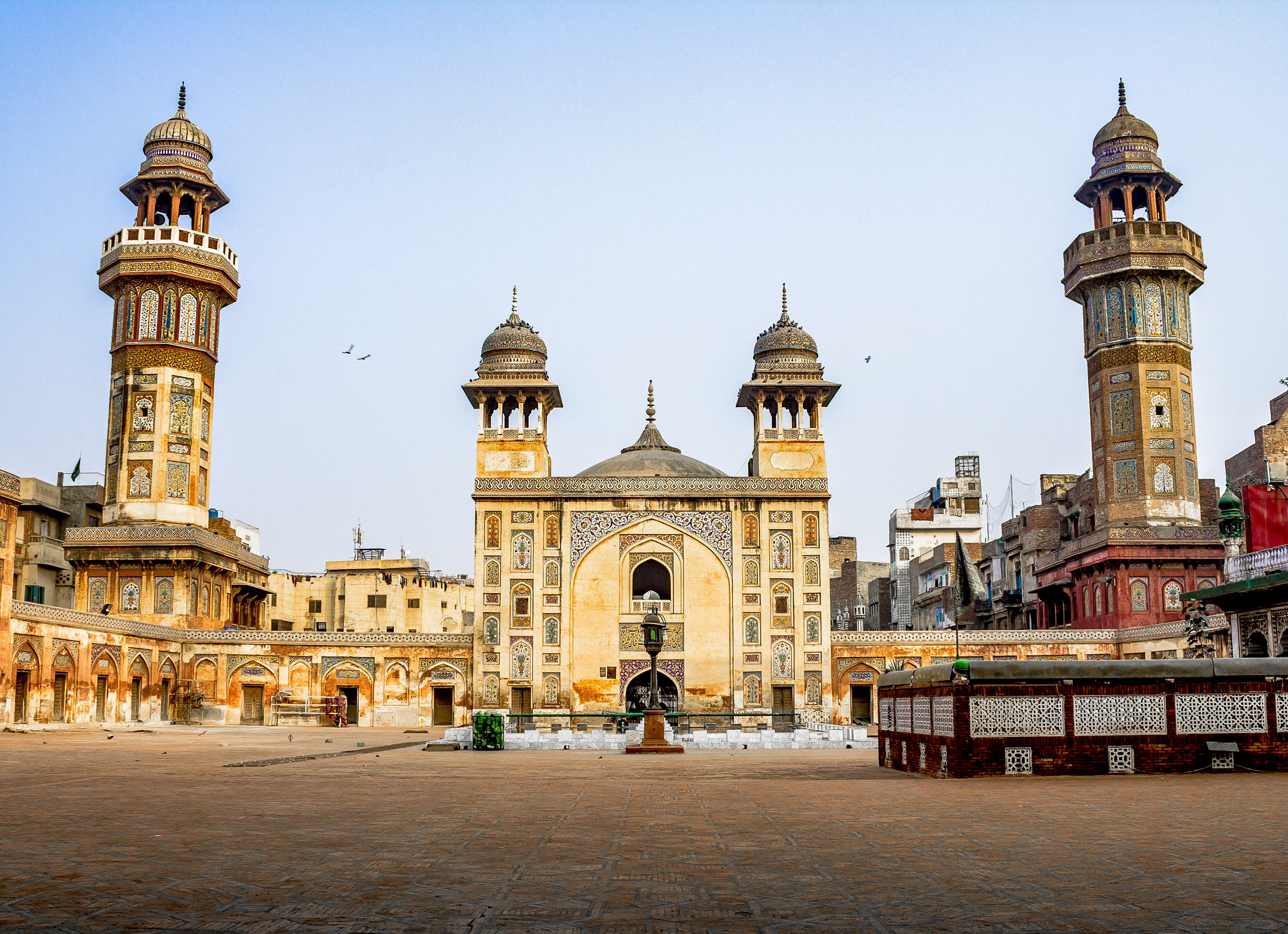
The Shah Jahan period Wazir Khan Mosque is considered to be the most ornately decorated Mughal-era mosque.

The Emperor Shah Jahan was born in Lahore in 1592, and bestowed the city with its famous Shalimar Gardens. By the time of his reign, six times as many Lahoris lived outside of the city walls than within. As a nobleman under Shah Jahan, Wazir Khan embarked on a program of architectural patronage. His first monumental project in the city was the Wazir Khan Mosque, built at the site of a simple pre-Mughal shrine. As Lahore's first monumental mosque, it is lavishly embellished with extensive fresco-work that synthesises Mughal and Punjabi influences. It is now considered to be the most ornately decorated Mughal-era mosque. He also built two other mosques in the Walled City, as well as the Shahi Hammam - famous for its lavish use of frescoes as a decorative element. He built for himself a haveli in the old city near the Shah Alami Bazaar called the Peri Mahal, or "Fairy Palace." He also laid a pleasure garden south of the Walled City known as Nakhla Bagh, where he also built for himself a baradari.

==== Aurangzeb ====
Shah Jahan's son, Emperor Aurangzeb, built the largest Mughal monument in Lahore, the iconic Badshahi Mosque. Emperor Aurangzeb also ordered the construction of the massive Alimgiri Gate at the Lahore Fort. He also improved civil infrastructure, and ordered the construction of the Alamgiri Bund - a channel built to divert the flow of the River Ravi.

=== Sikh period ===
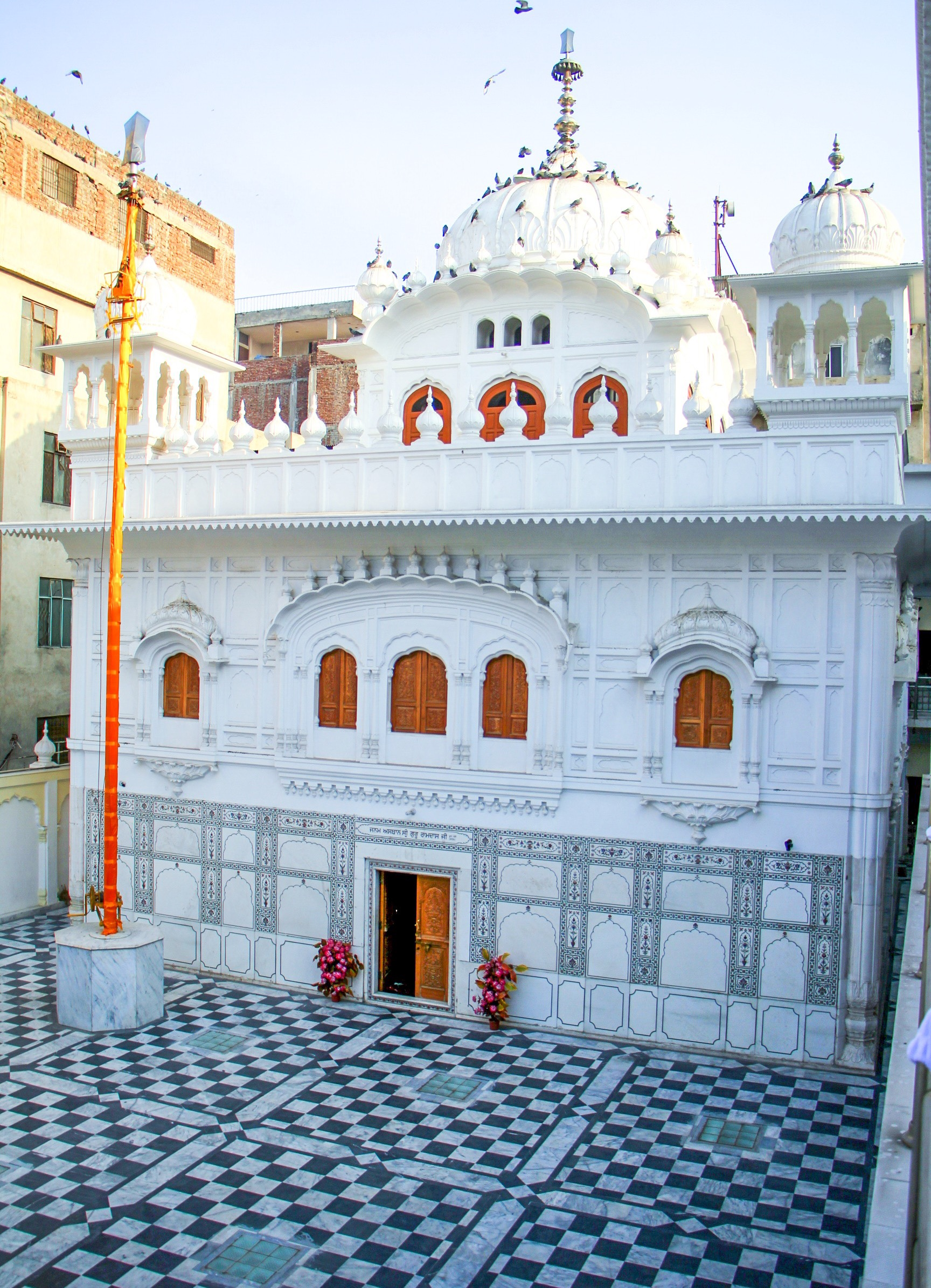
The Gurdwara Janam Asthan Guru Ram Das was built within the Walled City at the birthplace and childhood home of Guru Ram Das, the 4th Guru of Sikhism.

Following the collapse of Mughal rule, Lahore ceased to function as an imperial city. Trade abruptly stopped, and large areas of the city's suburbs were abandoned. By 1780, the city had fallen under the rule of small Sikh states known as Misls. The city and its revenues were partitioned among 3 Sikh chiefs - Gujjar Singh, Lahna Singh, and Sobha Singh. Instability during the Misl period contributed to the rise of nearby Amritsar as a commercial centre. The city's population rapidly declined during this era, and the entire population of the city was said to live within the confines of the Walled City, with numerous citadels and suburbs depopulated.

Instability hindered Lahore's progress until the arrival of Maharaja Ranjit Singh, who in 1799 made Lahore the Sikhs' administrative capital for the next 50 years, ruling from the Old City's Lahore Fort. Though the city's urban fabric lay in ruins by 1799, Sikh reconstruction from this era were based upon Mughal precedent. In 1812, they refurbished the city's defenses and added a second circuit of walls around the city that largely followed the outline of walls from the Akbari period. Numerous Mughal monuments were damaged, desecrated, or destroyed during this period.

Ranjit Singh and his descendant bestowed the Walled City with religious monuments such as the Gurdwara Dera Sahib, Gurdwara Janam Asthan Guru Ram Das, and Samadhi of Ranjit Singh, and numerous Hindu temples, as well as secular buildings such as the Haveli of Nau Nihal Singh, and Hazuri Bagh Baradari. They also refurbished the nearby Shalimar Gardens, while numerous gardens were laid outside the city walls by Sikh nobles.

By the end of Sikh rule, most of Lahore's massive Mughal haveli compounds had been occupied by settlers. New neighbourhoods occasionally grew up entirely within the confines of an old Mughal haveli, such as the Mohallah Pathran Wali, which grew within the ruins of a haveli of the same name that was built by Mian Khan. By 1831, all Mughal havelis in the Walled City had been encroached upon by the surrounding neighbourhood, leading to the modern-day absence of any Mughal havelis in Lahore.

=== British period ===
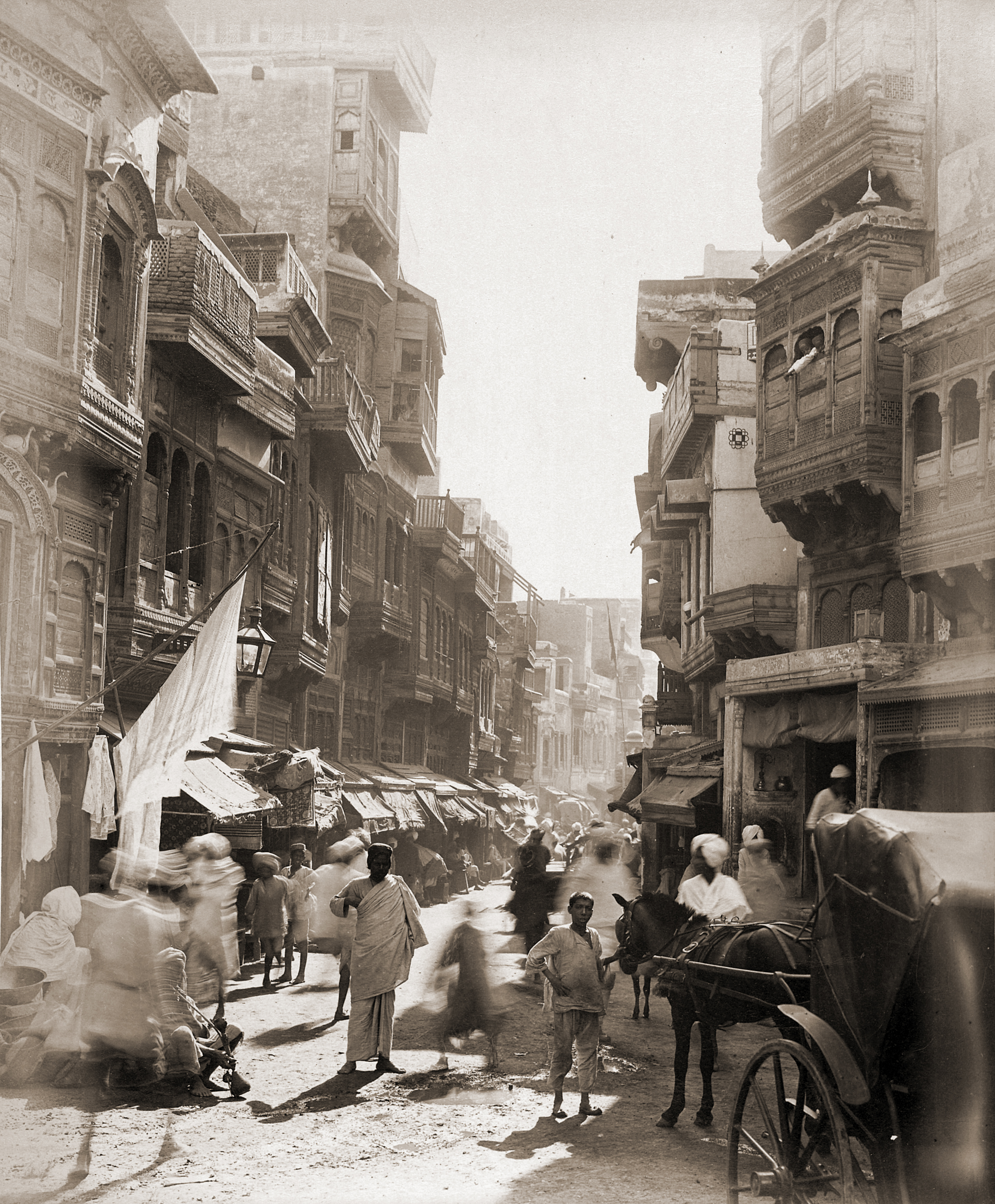
The Walled City around 1890.

After the British captured Lahore from the Sikhs in 1846, annexation of the Punjab in 1849, the Walled City's administrative practices were largely maintained. By the early 20th century, the Walled City's mohallahs were incorporated into a new municipal administrative system. Several of the city's older Mughal and Sikh monuments were repurposed by British authorities during their early rule, as resources for planning and building new administrative buildings were scarce. The Tomb of Anarkali, for example, was appropriated first for office space, before its conversion in 1851 into an Anglican church until 1891. It thereafter was used once again for civil purposes as a document repository - a function which it serves until present day. Chauburji was used as a police station during British rule. Several other Mughal tombs were used as residences by high ranking British administrators.

Following the Indian Rebellion of 1857, British colonialists destroyed Lahore's city walls, as well as its gateways, though several were later rebuilt. The British built the Lahore Junction railway station outside the city's former walls, in a unique fortified style complete with turrets and crenellations, and loopholes for directing rifle fire. The Circular Garden which once encompassed the Walled City on three sides was established by 1892. The Walled City's Rang Mahal was used first as a school for the American Presbyterian Mission, before being used as the first location of Lahore's prestigious Forman Christian College in 1896.

The British regarded the Walled City as a potential hotbed for disease and social instability, and instead focused development away from the Walled City, and into suburban areas to the south and east, where numerous British-era buildings now stand, along with the Lahore Cantonment - originally laid by British administrators. By the early 20th century, the Walled City's mohallahs came under the administration of British municipal laws which had only previously applied in Civil Station.

== Urban form ==
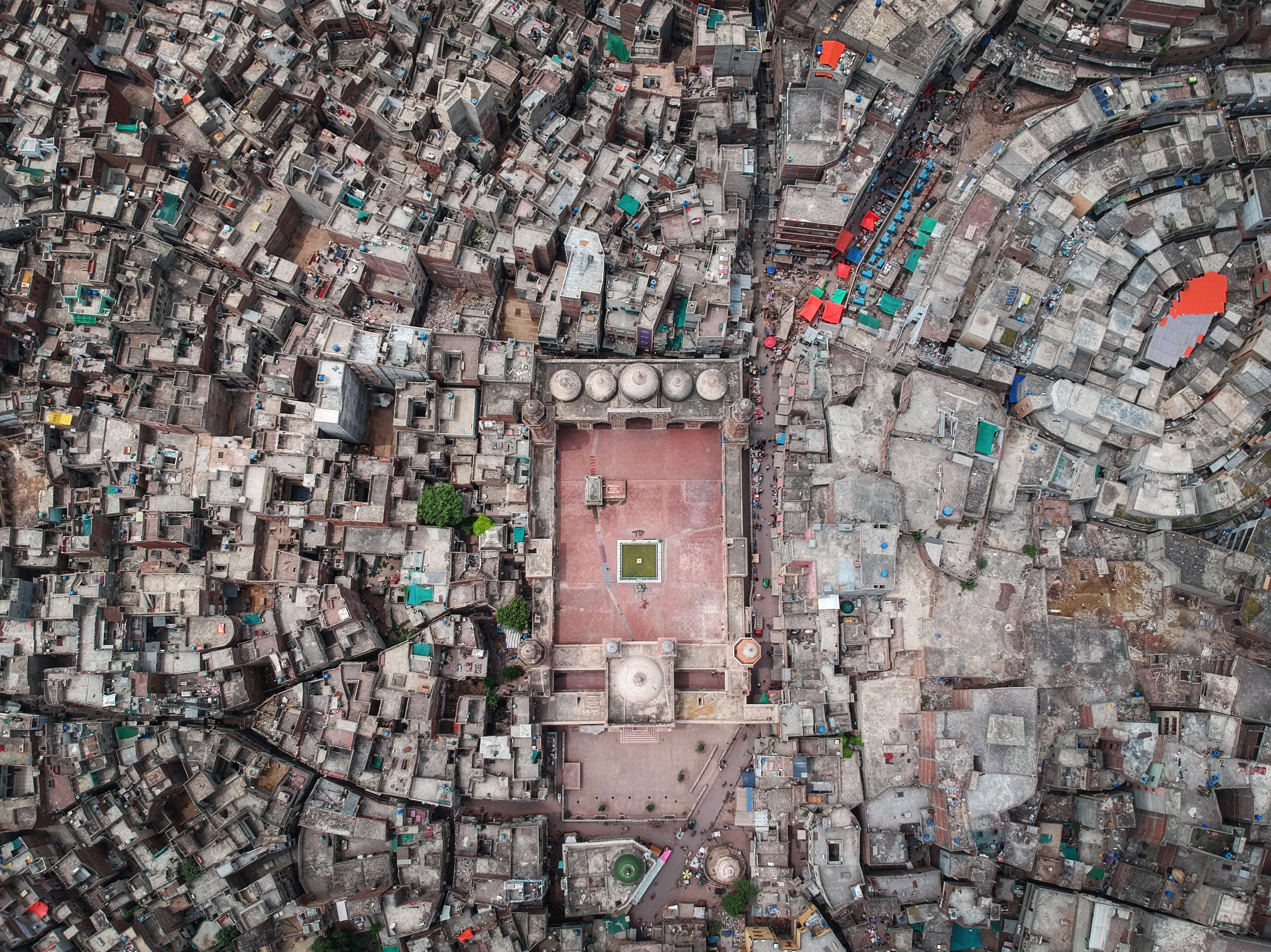
The area around the Wazir Khan Mosque exemplifies the Walled City's urban form

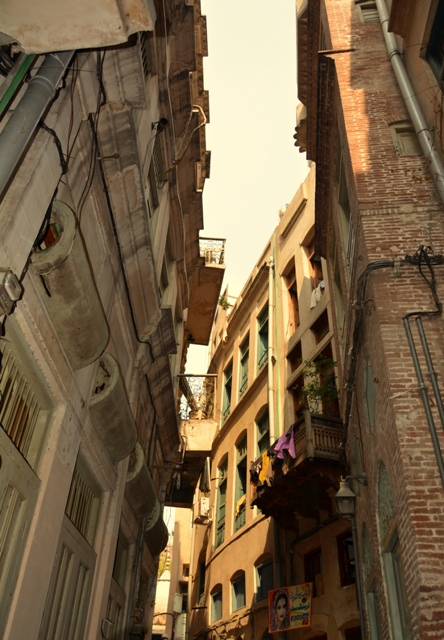
Gali Surjan Singh typifies the Walled City's dense construction along narrow passageways.

The city of Lahore during the Ghaznavid era was probably located in the southwest portion of today's Walled City, with several of the city's pre-Mughal tombs built along the perimeter of this area. The Gumti Bazaar forms an arc along what may have been the southern boundary of the pre-Mughal city. A mud fort is believed to have surrounded the medieval city, and may have been built by Malik Ayaz, the first Muslim governor of Lahore.

As late as 1864, the Lahori Mandi area had been known as kacha kot, meaning "the mud fort," a name derived from the gradient of the land, the water flow, and the formation of mohallahs, kuchas, and kattrahs. The curve of Kucha Pir Bola. for example, merges with Waachowali Bazaar, the Lahori Bazaar merges with Chowk Lahori Mandi, and Chowk Mati merges with Papar Mandi, which may outline the old fort.

The Mughal period beginning in the Akbari period until the early 18th century most decisively determined the city's character. Mughal Emperors embellished the city with monuments, and the city accumulated monuments from several different periods - in contrast to Fatehpur Sikri or Old Delhi which were largely built during the reign of a single Mughal Emperor. The Mughal city was divided into urban quarters known as guzārs. During the Akbari period, only 9 of Lahore's 26 guzārs were located within the boundaries of Lahore's city walls. Suburbs grew around the Walled City in areas to its east and south, and most was done in an ad hoc manner with concern paid to the developments immediate environment, rather than a larger masterplan.

During the Jahangir period, the city grew rapidly. Lahore's suburban areas extended up to 5 kilometres from the Walled City. Empress Nur Jahan and her family built a number of residences and gardens within the Walled City, and outside of the city walls in the suburbs during this period. Her practice of building garden-residences successfully wove a culture of gardens into the rapidly urbanising city.

Properties in the Walled City were often carved into smaller pieces over time. Inhabitants of the same building, and mohallah, were inhabited by members of different religions and castes. Though some neighbourhoods in the Walled City are named after individual groups, these areas did not remain homogeneous.

During the British era, the city's eastern walls were shifted about 100 metres further east. Whereas Chitta Gate had served as the city's original "Delhi Gate", and previously opened directed onto Wazir Khan Chowk. During the British era, a new gate was built next to the Shahi Hammam, and new streets built in that area.

The Shah Alami Bazaar area was once a largely Hindu quarter of the Walled City, and was the busiest and most densely populated part of the city where sunlight would rarely reach the street below. During the 1947 riots that accompanied the Partition of British India, much of the area was burnt down, with rebuilding of the area beginning in 1949. Rebuilding was done in a contemporary style, rather than the historic style of the rest of the city, in order to widen streets and to create more commercial space.

The convoluted and picturesque streets of the inner city remain almost intact, but the rapid demolition and frequently illegal rebuilding taking place throughout the city is causing the historic fabric to be eroded and replaced by inferior constructions.

== Demographics ==
The Walled City of Lahore covers an area of 256 ha with a population of 200,000. Before partition, in 1947, the Walled City had a concentration of 48% Hindus, 38% Muslims and 12% Sikhs. Once Pakistan and India were formed - the area saw a mass exodus of Hindus and Sikhs, with the area now being populated primarily by the Punjabis from West Pakistan, immigrants from East Punjab (Haryana, Himachal Pradesh and Punjab, of India) and Pashtuns. As of now, the population is 99% Muslims, comprising Punjabis, mostly.

In the past two decades, there has been an ever-increasing Pashtun population, with traders arriving and settling from the KPK, and parts of Afghanistan.

== Heritage sites ==
=== Lahore Fort ===
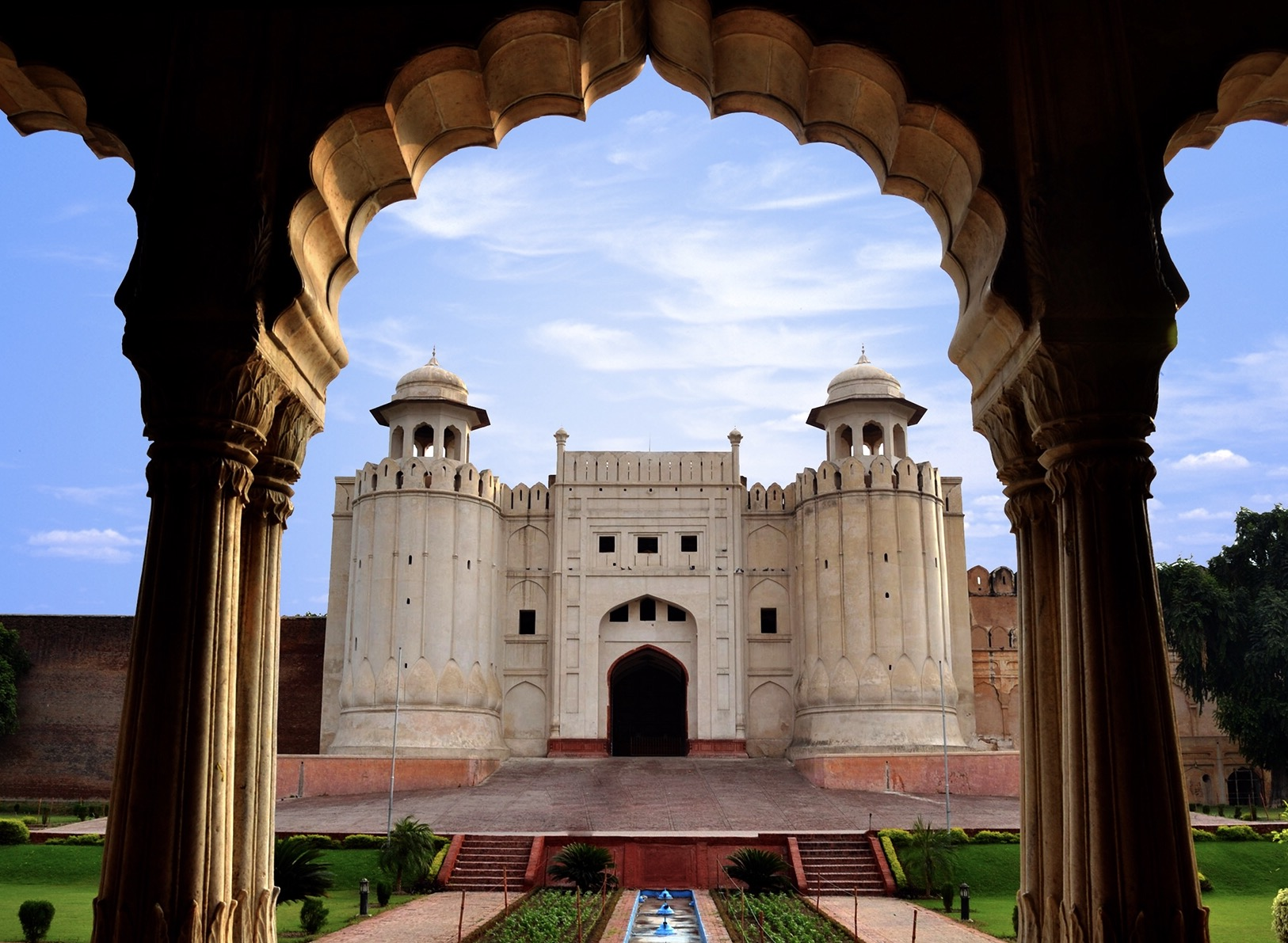
The Alamgiri Gate serves as the main entrance to the Lahore Fort, and faces the Hazuri Bagh quadrangle.

The Lahore Fort (Punjabi and Urdu: شاہی قلعہ: Shahi Qila, or "Royal Fort") is a citadel at the northern end of Lahore's Walled City that spreads over an area greater than 20 hectares. It contains 21 notable monuments, some of which date to the era of Emperor Akbar. Some of its monuments are famous sites themselves, including the white marble Naulakha Pavilion, the Sheesh Mahal ("Palace of Mirrors"), Pearl Mosque, and the fort's massive Picture Wall.

The Lahore Fort is notable for having been almost entirely rebuilt in the 17th century, when the Mughal Empire was at the height of its splendour and opulence. In 1981, the fort was inscribed as a UNESCO World Heritage Site for its "outstanding repertoire" of Mughal monuments dating from the era when the empire was at its artistic and aesthetic zenith.

=== Mosques ===
==== Badshahi Mosque ====
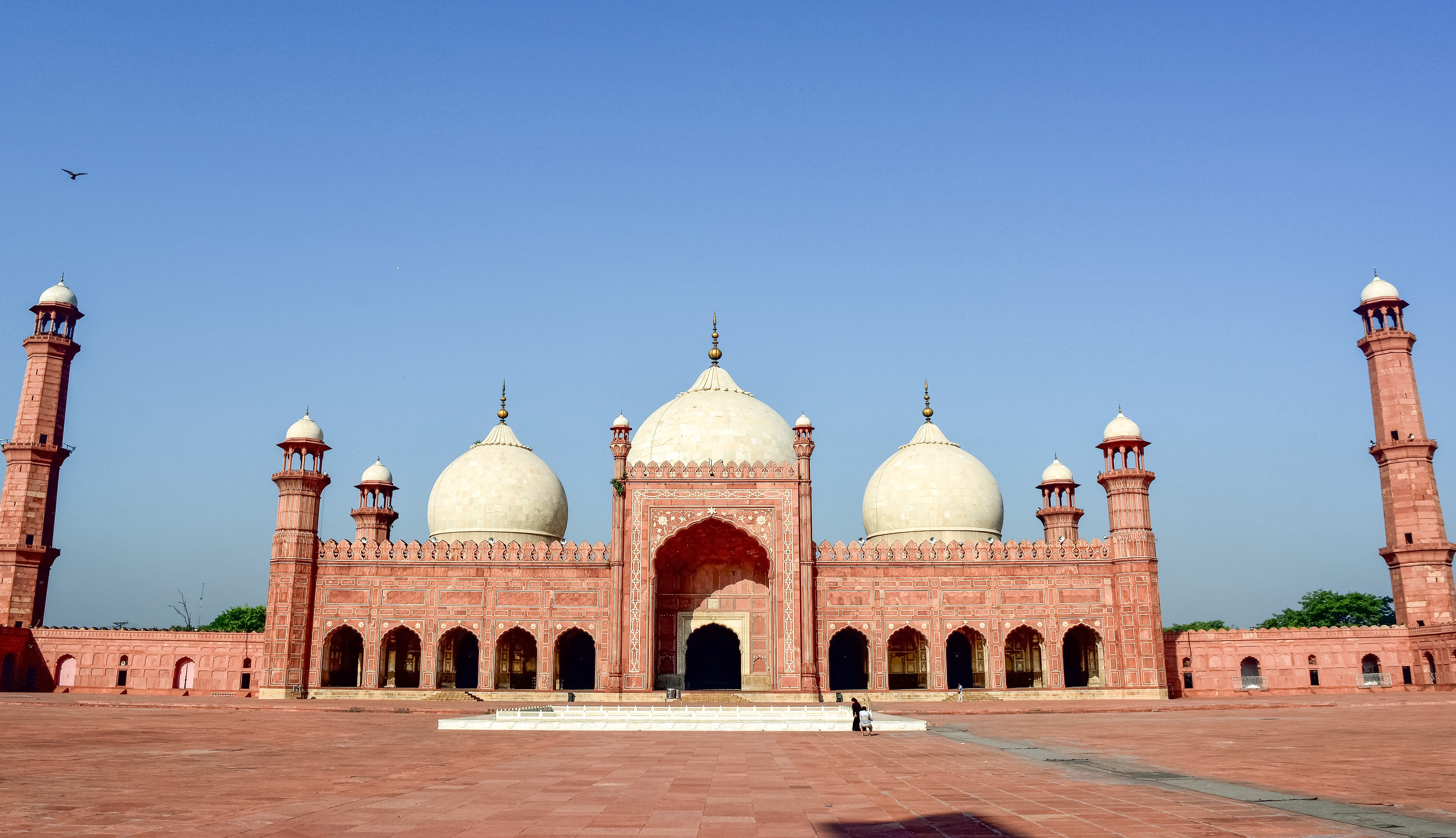
Lahore's Badshahi Mosque dates from the late 1600s, and was the last of the grand Mughal imperial mosques to be built.

The Badshahi Mosque (Urdu: بادشاہی مسجد, or "Imperial Mosque") is a Mughal era mosque built in 1671-73 that is located west of Lahore Fort, and fronts the fort across the Hazuri Bagh quadrangle. The architecture and design of the Badshahi Masjid is closely related to the Jama Masjid in Delhi, India, which was built in 1648 by Aurangzeb's father and predecessor, Shah Jahan.

Badshahi Mosque was commissioned by Emperor Aurangzeb in 1671, with construction of the mosque lasting for two years until 1673. The mosque is an important example of Mughal architecture, with an exterior that is decorated with carved red sandstone with marble inlay. It is the largest and most recent of the grand imperial mosques of the Mughal-era, and is the second-largest mosque in Pakistan. The mosque is now widely considered to be one of Lahore's most iconic landmarks.

==== Wazir Khan Mosque ====
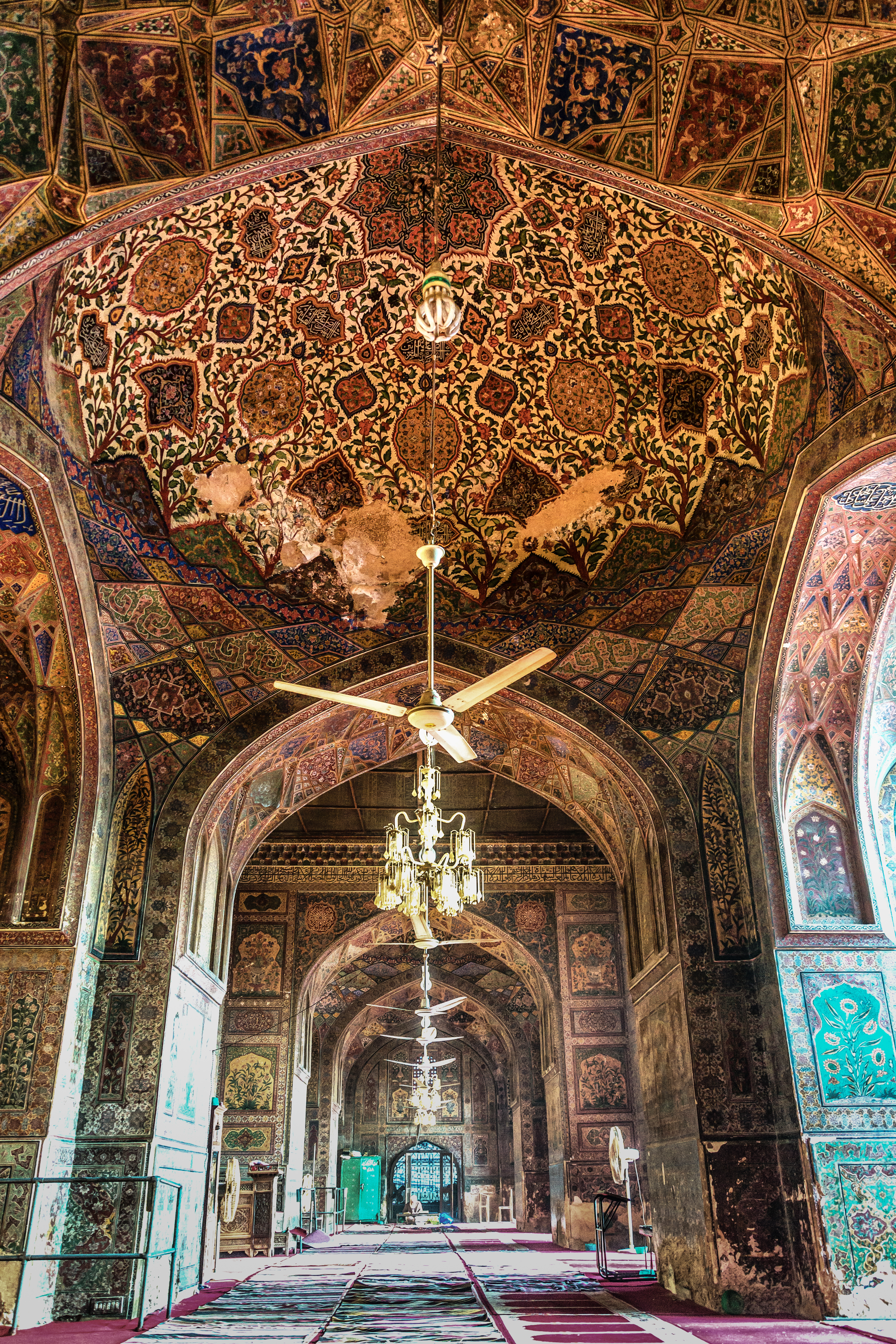
Wazir Khan Mosque is renowned for its intricate and extensive embellishment.

The Wazir Khan Mosque (Urdu: مسجد وزیر خان; Masjid Wazīr Khān) is a 17th-century mosque near the Delhi Gate and Chitta Gate that was commissioned during the reign of the Mughal Emperor Shah Jahan as part of an ensemble of buildings that also included the nearby Shahi Hammam baths. Construction of Wazir Khan Mosque began in 1634 C.E., and was completed in 1641.

Considered to be the most ornately decorated Mughal-era mosque, Wazir Khan Mosque is renowned for its intricate faience tile work known as kashi-kari, as well as its interior surfaces that are almost entirely embellished with elaborate Mughal-era frescoes. The mosque has been under extensive restoration since 2009 under the direction of the Aga Khan Trust for Culture and the Government of Punjab, with contributions from the governments of Germany, Norway, and the United States.

==== Begum Shahi Mosque ====
The Begum Shahi Mosque (Urdu: بیگم شاہی مسجد) is an early 17th-century mosque that was built between 1611 and 1614 during the reign of Mughal Emperor Jahangir in honour of his mother. It is Lahore's earliest surviving example of a Mughal-era mosque, and influenced construction of the larger Wazir Khan Mosque a few decades later.

==== Sunehri Mosque ====
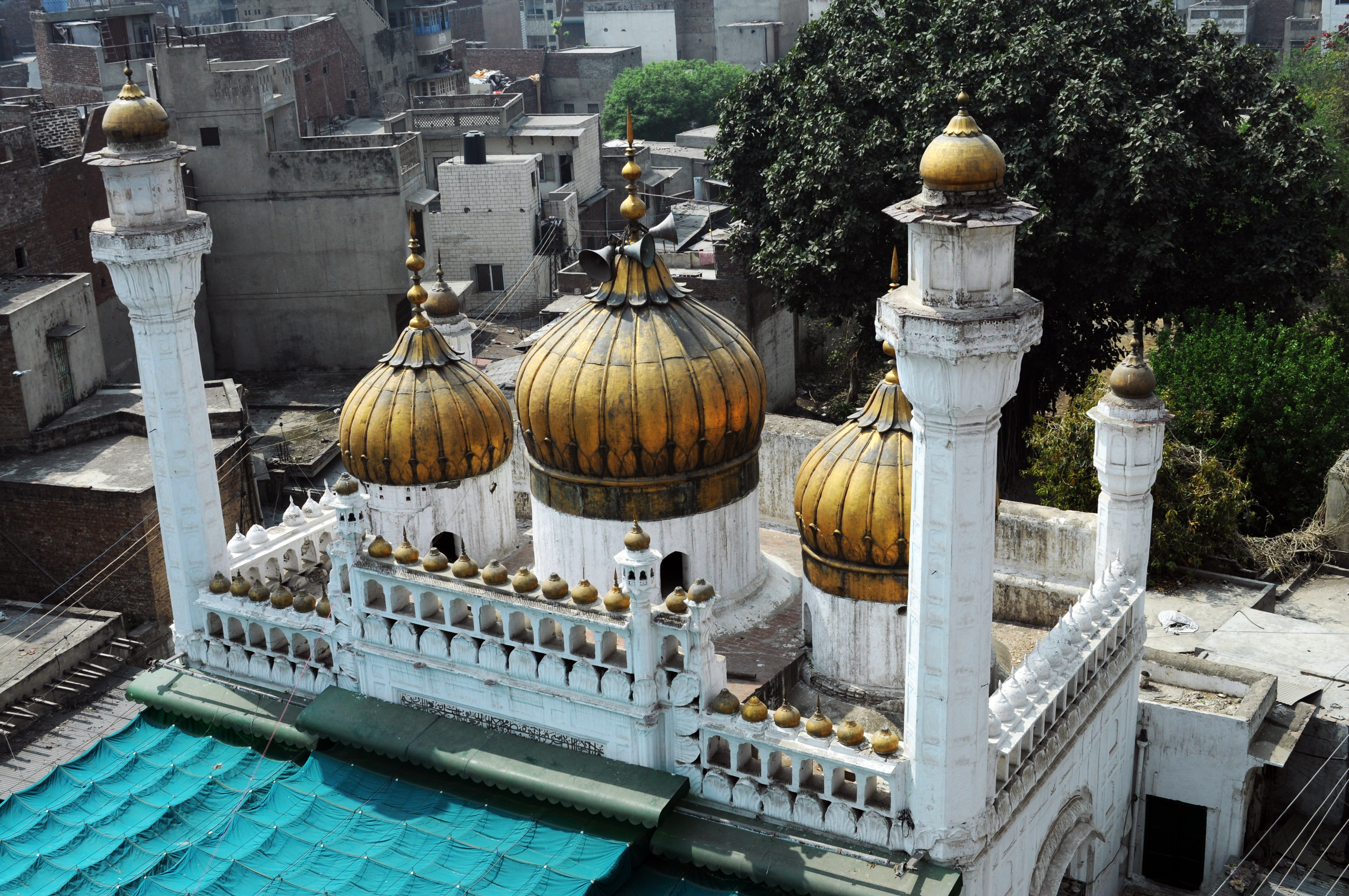
The Sunehri Mosque is named for its gilded domes.

The Sunheri Mosque (Urdu: سنہری مسجد, or Golden Mosque), also known as the Talai Mosque, is a late Mughal architecture-era mosque in Lahore's walled city that is named in honour of its gilded domes. Unlike the Wazir Khan Mosque and Badshahi Mosque which were built at the zenith of the Mughal Empire in the 17th century, the Sunehri Mosque was built in 1753 when the empire was in decline.

During Sikh rule, the mosque was seized by Sikh authorities and converted into a gurdwara, after a copy of the Guru Granth Sahib was installed in the mosque following Sikhs complaints that the Muslim call to prayer from the mosque was disturbing their religious ceremonies at a newly constructed baoli (stepped well) nearby.

==== Neevin Mosque ====
The Neevin Mosque (Urdu: نیویں مسجد), is a 15th-century mosque built during the Lodi dynasty of the Delhi Sultanate. Neevin Mosque is notable for its foundation 25 feet below street level. The mosque is further noted for being one of Lahore's few remaining pre-Mughal monuments.

=== Gurdwaras ===
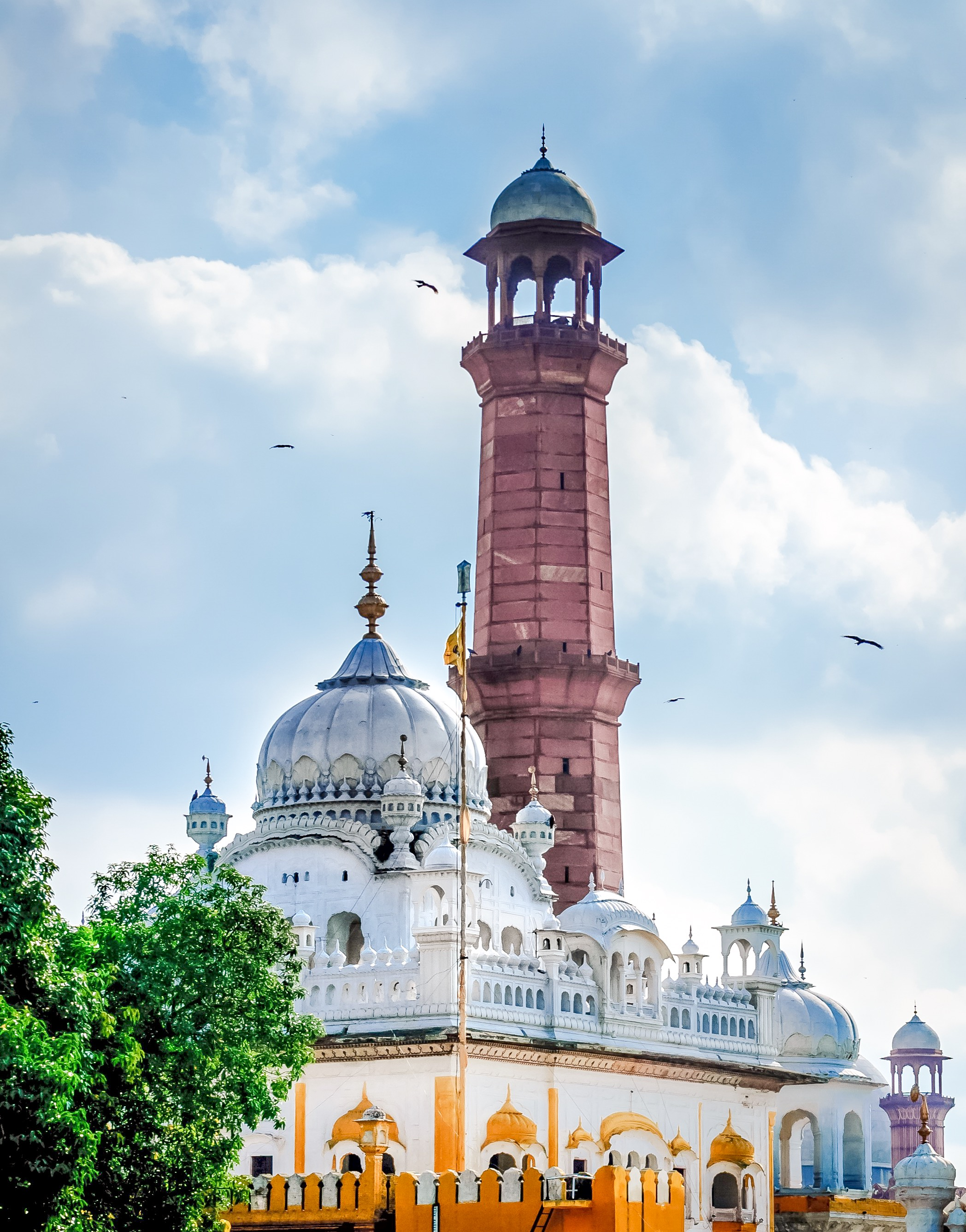
The Samadhi of Ranjit Singh was built next to the iconic Badshahi Mosque.

==== Samadhi of Ranjit Singh ====
The Samadhi of Ranjit Singh (Urdu: رنجیت سنگھ کی سمادھی) is a 19th-century shrine that houses the funerary urns of the Sikh ruler Ranjit Singh (1780 - 1839). It is located adjacent the Lahore Fort and Badshahi Mosque, as well the Gurdwara Dera Sahib which marks the spot where the 5th guru of Sikhism, Guru Arjan Dev, died.

==== Gurdwara Dera Sahib ====
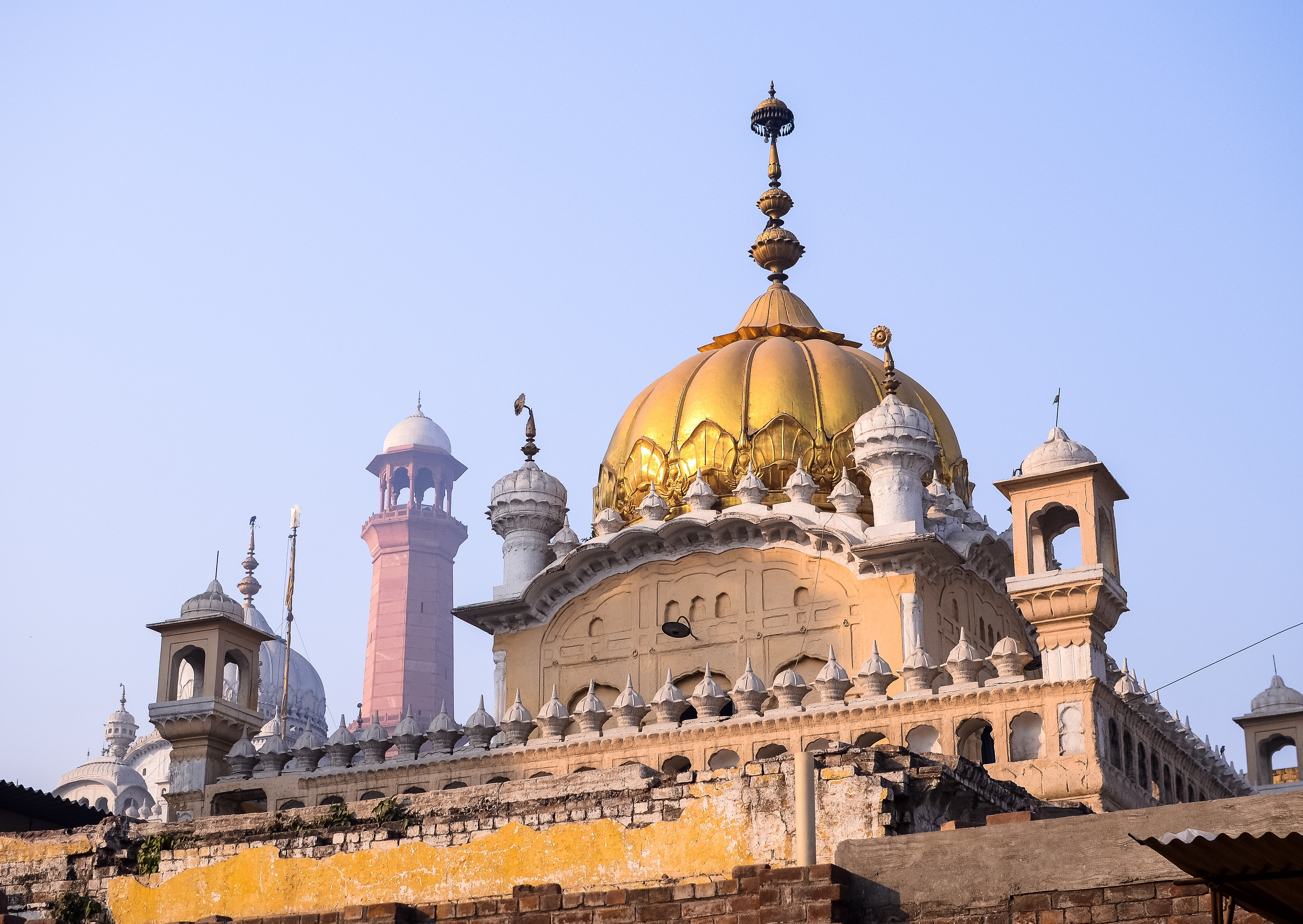
The Gurdwara Dera Sahib was built where the 5th Guru of Sikhism is believed to have died in 1606.

Gurdwara Dera Sahib (Urdu: گوردوارہ ڈیہرا صاحب) commemorates the spot where the 5th guru of Sikhism, Guru Arjan Dev, died in 1606. Construction of the building was started by Kharak Singh on the spot where he was cremated, and was completed by his youngest son, Duleep Singh in 1848. The gurdwara combines elements of Sikh, Hindu, and Islamic architecture. Portions of the building are believed to have been plundered from the adjacent Lahore Fort.

==== Janam Asthan Guru Ram Das ====
The Gurdwara Janam Asthan Guru Ram Das (Urdu: گردوارہ جنم استھان گورو رام داس) is a gurdwara built atop the site traditionally believed to be the location of the birthplace and childhood home of Guru Ram Das, the 4th Sikh gurus. The gurdwara is located in the Chuna Mandi Bazaar in the Walled City of Lahore, near the Lahore Fort, and Begum Shahi Mosque. The shrine is located along the Shahi Guzargah, or "Royal Passage" that began at Delhi Gate, and terminated at the Lahore Fort.

=== Havelis ===
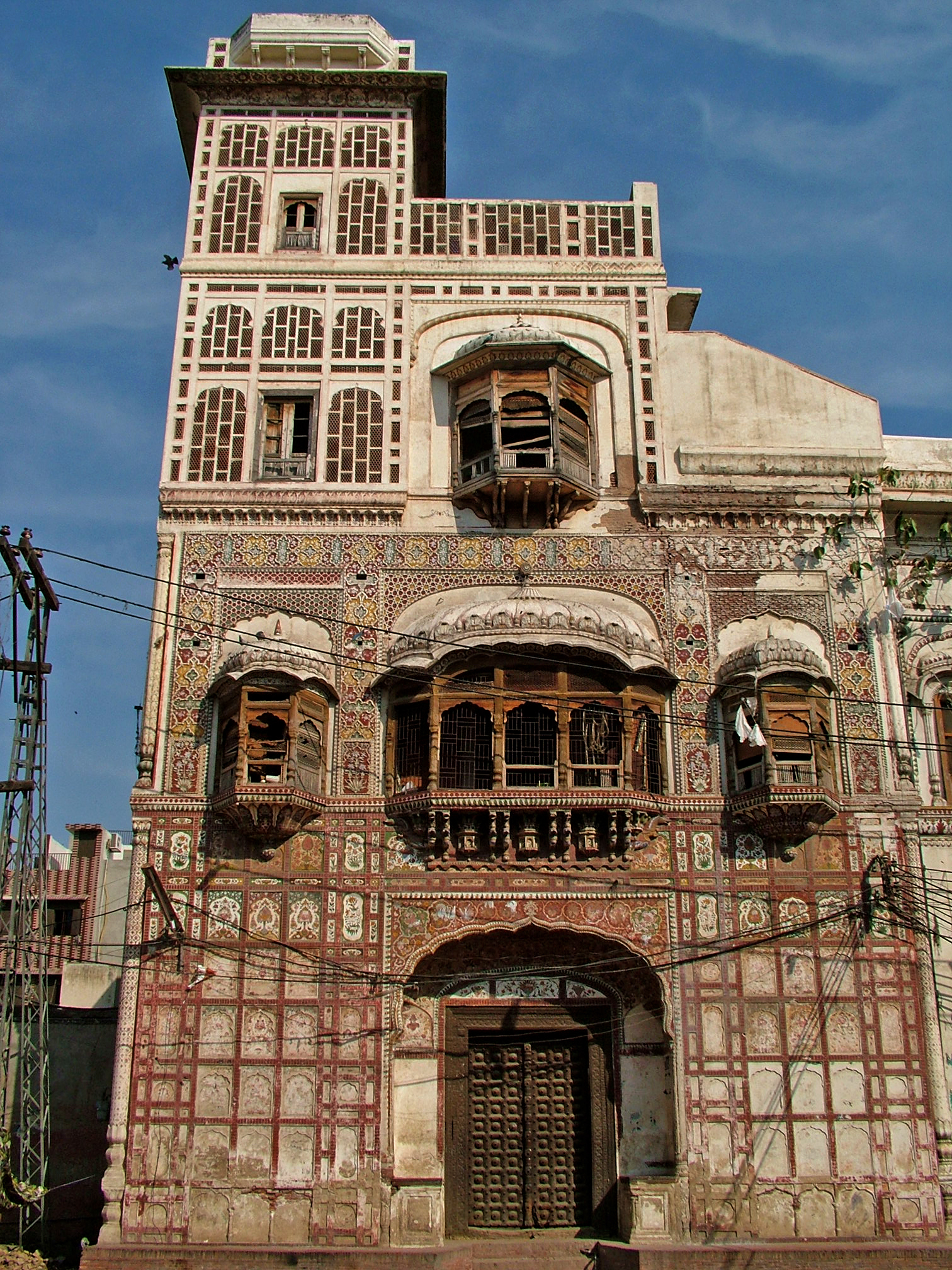
The Haveli of Nau Nihal Singh is the most notable surviving example of Sikh architecture in Lahore.

There are many havelis inside the Walled City of Lahore, some in good condition while others need urgent attention. Many of these havlis are fine examples of Mughal and Sikh Architecture. Some of the havelis inside the Walled City include:

==== Haveli of Nau Nihal Singh ====
The Haveli of Nau Nihal Singh (Urdu: نو نہال سنگھ حویلی) is considered to be one of the finest examples of Sikh architecture in Lahore, and is the only Sikh-era haveli that preserves its original ornamentation and architecture. The haveli is noted for its lavishly decorated western façade, displaying vivid Kangra-style painting. The site has been used as a girls' school since the British colonial-era.

Haveli Agha Gull :

Inside Sheranwala Gate lies Khizri Street. At the end of this lane, around the year 1875, Prince Sultan Muhammad Jamal Durrani, a descendant of Prince Salman Shah—son of Ahmad Shah Abdali, the King of Afghanistan—constructed a mansion, later famously known as Haveli Agha Gull.

Prince Sultan Muhammad Jamal Durrani was himself a distinguished religious scholar. His son, Prince Sultan Ali Durrani (author of Misbah-ul-Hidayat, 1923), was also a scholar and closely related to Prince Ayoob Shah. This haveli also became the residence of Prince Sultan Ahmad Durrani and Ghulam Hussain Qureshi—both of whom were religious figures. Ghulam Hussain Qureshi was notably the teacher of Pakistan's prominent Islamic scholar, Allama Alauddin Siddiqui.

This very haveli was also the childhood home of writer and columnist Qaiser Ali Agha. (Reference: Azeem Mujahid Ahmad Shah Abdali, p. 158, written by Qaiser Ali Agha)

Today, the main wooden gate of this haveli no longer exists—though a photograph of it has been preserved. The remaining parts of the structure have been replaced by a market. Due to its deep placement within narrow alleys, this historic haveli has largely remained hidden from public attention.

The haveli had five entrances: three from the Khizri neighbourhood. The main entrance was a large wooden gate, above which the following verse was inscribed:

بسم اللہ الرحمن الرحیم

لی خَمسۃٌ اُطفی بِہم حَرَّ الجَحیمِ الحاطِمہ

المُصطفی و المُرتضی و ابناہما و الفاطمہ

مکان غلام آل عبا شہزادہ سلطان محمد جمال 

The second and third entrances were also located within the same lane, while the second major entrance led to Katri Agha Gull. Near this gate was the home of Fayyaz Pehlwan, also known as Fauji Pehlwan. In the same lane lived a family that published the Holy Quran under the name Al-Mumtaz Company, making this part of Khizri Gali of significant historical value.

Next to the main gate, separate from the haveli, was an area where a well once existed. A two-storey structure was later built on this site. The fifth entrance was from the side of Raratiyaan (near Azam Cloth Market, Lahore).

- Nisar Haveli
- Mubarak Haveli
- Haveli Barood Khana
- Mubarak Begum Haveli
- Haveli Agha Gull (Khizri Street Sharanwala Gate)
- Salman Sirhindi's Haveli
- Haveli of Dina Nath
- Chuna Mandi Havelis
- Fakir Khana Haveli
- Lal Haveli
- Haveli Sir Wajid Ali Shah (Near Nisar Haveli)
- Haveli Mian Khan (Rang Mehal)
- Haveli Shergharian (Near Lal Khou)

=== Other landmarks ===
==== Royal baths ====
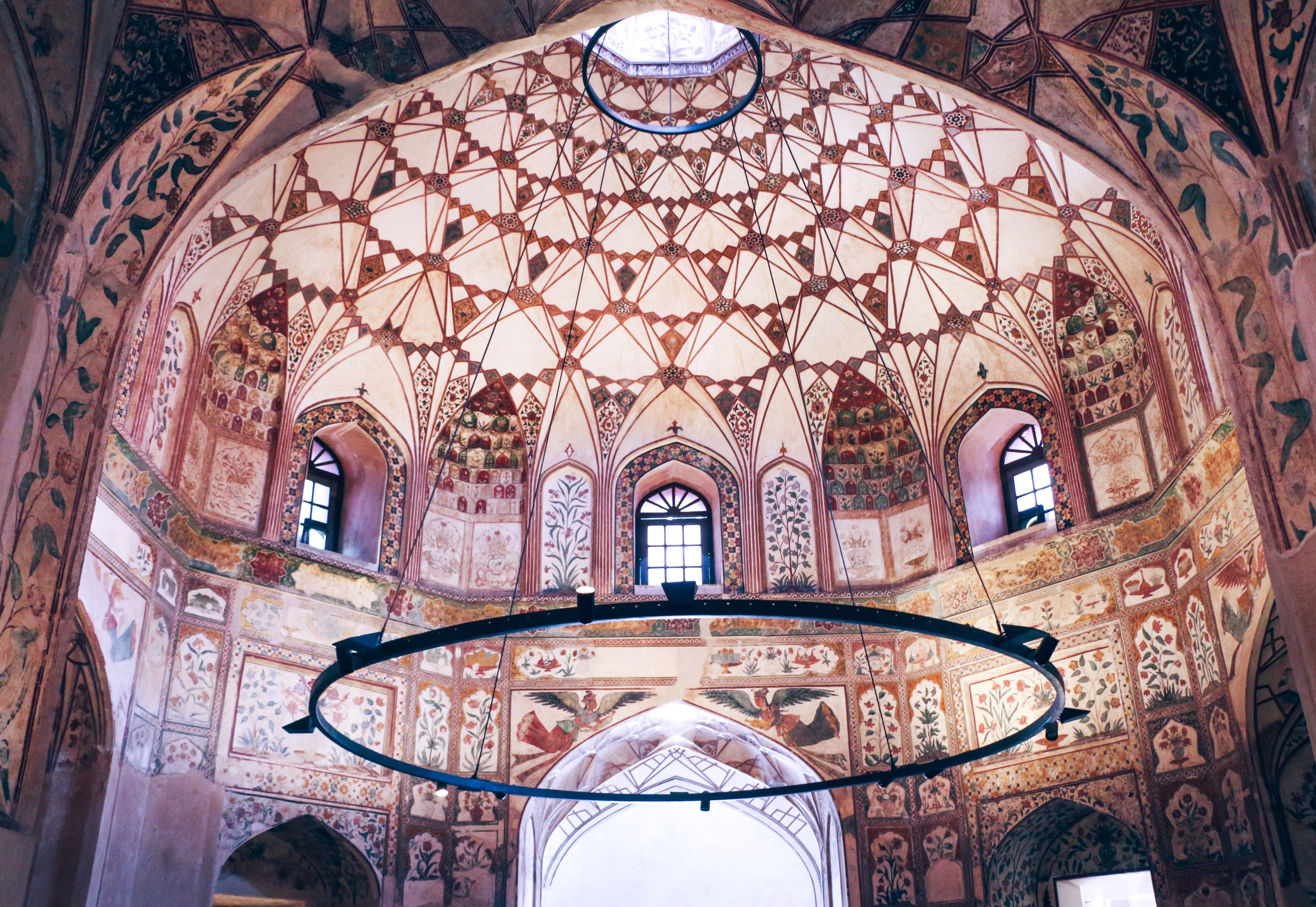
The Shahi Hammam is known for its extensive collection of Mughal frescoes.

The Shahi Hammam (Urdu: شاہی حمام; "Royal Baths"), is a Persian-style bath which was built in 1635 C.E. during the reign of Emperor Shah Jahan. The Shahi Hammam is noted for its extensive embellishment with Mughal-era frescoes that have recently been restored. The baths were built to serve as a waqf, or endowment, for the maintenance of the Wazir Khan Mosque.

No longer used as a hammam, the baths were restored between 2013 and 2015 by the Aga Khan Trust for Culture and the Walled City of Lahore Authority. The restoration project was given an Award of Merit by UNESCO in 2016 for the hammam's successful conservation which returned it to its "former prominence."

==== Hazuri Bagh Baradari ====
The Hazuri Bagh Baradari (Urdu: حضوری باغ بارہ دری) is a baradari of white marble located in the Hazuri Bagh quadrangle, which forms the space between the Alamgiri Gate of the Lahore Fort, and the Badshahi Mosque. It was built by Maharaja Ranjit Singh, Sikh ruler of Punjab in 1818. The pavilion consisted of two storeys until it was damaged by lightning in 1932.

==== Fort Road Food Street ====
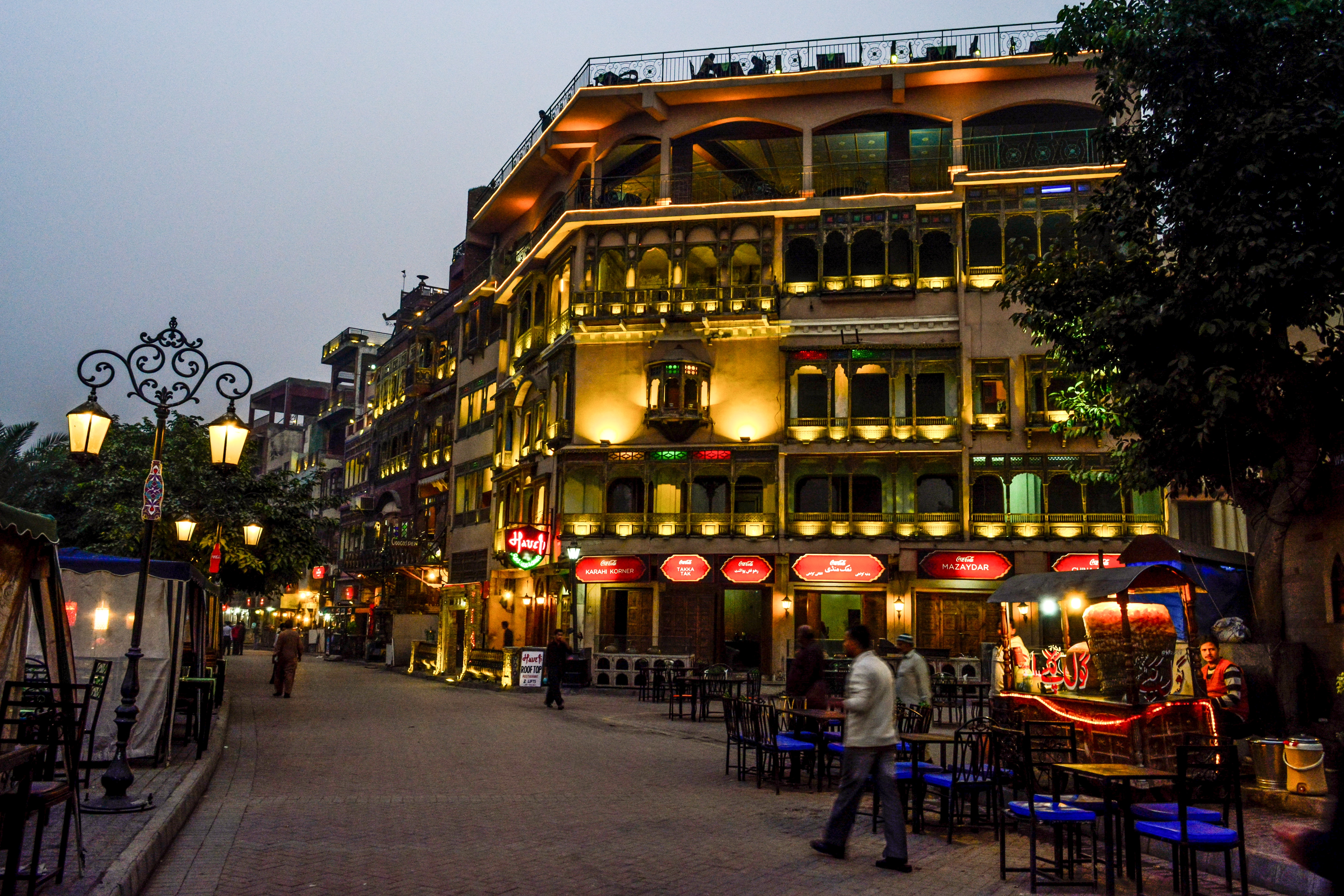
Outlets on the Fort Road Food Street specialise in Lahori cuisine.

The Fort Road Food Street (Urdu: سڑک خوراک - روشنائی دروازہ) is a pedestrianised area located on the Fort Road within the walled city that is dedicated to culinary stalls and restaurants specialising Lahori cuisine. The street has colourful lights and views of Badshahi Mosque and is near the Roshnai Gate

==== Gates ====
The Walled City of Lahore once had 13 gates. All survived until the 1857 Uprising when in an effort to de-fortify the city, all but one of the gates were destroyed by the British. Three were rebuilt as simpler structures, while the Delhi Gate, Shah Alami Gate, and Lohari Gate were built in a more elaborate style. The Shah Alami Gate was destroyed during riots following the Partition of British India.

Name	Picture	Description
Bhati Gate بھاٹی گیٹ		The entrance to the "Bhati Gate" is located on the western wall of the old city. The area inside the gate is well known throughout the city for its food. Just outside "Bhati Gate" is the Data Durbar, the mausoleum of the Sufi saint Ali Hajweri - widely considered to be Lahore's patron saint.
Delhi Gate دہلی گیٹ		The "Dehli Gate" was on the road that led from Lahore to Delhi. The gate was built during the Mughal era at the present date Chitta Gate. The present gate was built by the British in the 19th century, further east from the "old Delhi Gate"
Kashmiri Gate کشمیری گیٹ		The "Kashmiri Gate" faces the direction of Kashmir.
Lohari Gate لوہاری گیٹ		The "Lohari Gate" is very close to "Bhati Gate". The gate is named Lohori because many lohar blacksmith workshops that were based just outside this gate.
Roshnai Gate روشنائی دروازہ		The "Roshnai Gate", also known as the "Gate of Lights", is located between the Lahore Fort and the Badshahi Mosque. The gate was one of the main entrances into the city, and was constantly visited by Omerahs, courtiers, royal servants and retinues. In the evenings, the gate was lit up, hence its name. The gate was also referred to as the "Gate of Splendour". It is the only gate that still largely remains in its original state
Shairanwala Gate شیرنوالا گیٹ		The "Shairanwala Gate" ("Lions Gate"), originally known as Khizri Gate, was made by Maharaja Ranjit Singh. After its completion, Singh placed two live lions (or Shers) in cages at the gate as a symbolic warning to potential enemies.

===== Former gates =====
Name	Description
Akbari Gate	The "Akbari gate" was also commonly known as Delhi gate in modern-day Lahore. The "Akbari Gate" is named after the Mughal emperor Akbar, who rebuilt the town and citadel. Close to this gate the emperor also founded a market, which is named after him, "Akbari Mandi" (Akbari Market).
Masti Gate	Just behind the Lahore Fort is the entrance to the "Masti Gate", also known as the "Gate of Merriment". This area is dominated by wholesale shoe sellers who sell both traditional- and Western-style shoes. Located further down the street is one of the city's oldest Masjids, the Masjid of Mariyam Zamani Begum, named after the mother of Jahangir, Mariyam Zamani.
Mochi Gate	Located at the entrance to Mochi Bagh (garden) and amidst a bustling bazaar (market), the "Mochi Gate" is a historical gate built during the Mughal period. In Urdu, Mochi means cobbler, which may indicate that the bazaar was once a market for shoes and repair shops. Another theory is that according to legend the gate was named after Moti, a guard of the gate during the Mughal era, who guarded and looked after the gate all his life. Later on, the name was distorted and became Mochi. Today, the bazaar around the Mochi gate is renowned for its dry fruits, kites and fireworks. Mochi Gate is the entrance to the Mochi Bagh, where many renowned Pakistani leaders of past and present have delivered speeches.
Mori Gate	Located between the Lahori Gate and Bhati Gate, the "Mori Gate" is the smallest of the gates of the walled city. This gate was used to remove the waste and disposal material from the city. Mori Gate was never considered an official gate, but the residents of Lahore considered it to be the 13th gate.
Shah-Alami Gate	The "Shah-Alami Gate" is named after one of the sons of the Mughal emperor Aurangzeb, Shah Alam I. Before his death, the gate was called the "Bherwala Gate". During the 1947 independence riots, the gate was burned. Today only the name survives. One of Lahore's biggest commercial markets, "Shah Alam Market" or Shalmi as locals call it, exists near the site of the gate.
Taxali Gate	The "Taxali Gate", also known as the Taxal (royal mint), was built during the Mughal reign. There is a shoe market located here known as Sheikupurian Bazar. There are a variety of foods available in and around this gate - one of the most beloved being Sri Pai from Fazal Din aka "Phajja". Taj Mehal and Shahbudin Halwi are a couple of the more popular sweet stores.
Yakki Gate	The "Yakki Gate" was named after the martyr saint "Zakki". Zakki fell while defending the city against the Mughal invaders from the north. Over time the name "Zakki" became distorted to what the gate is known as today: "Yakki".

== Conservation ==
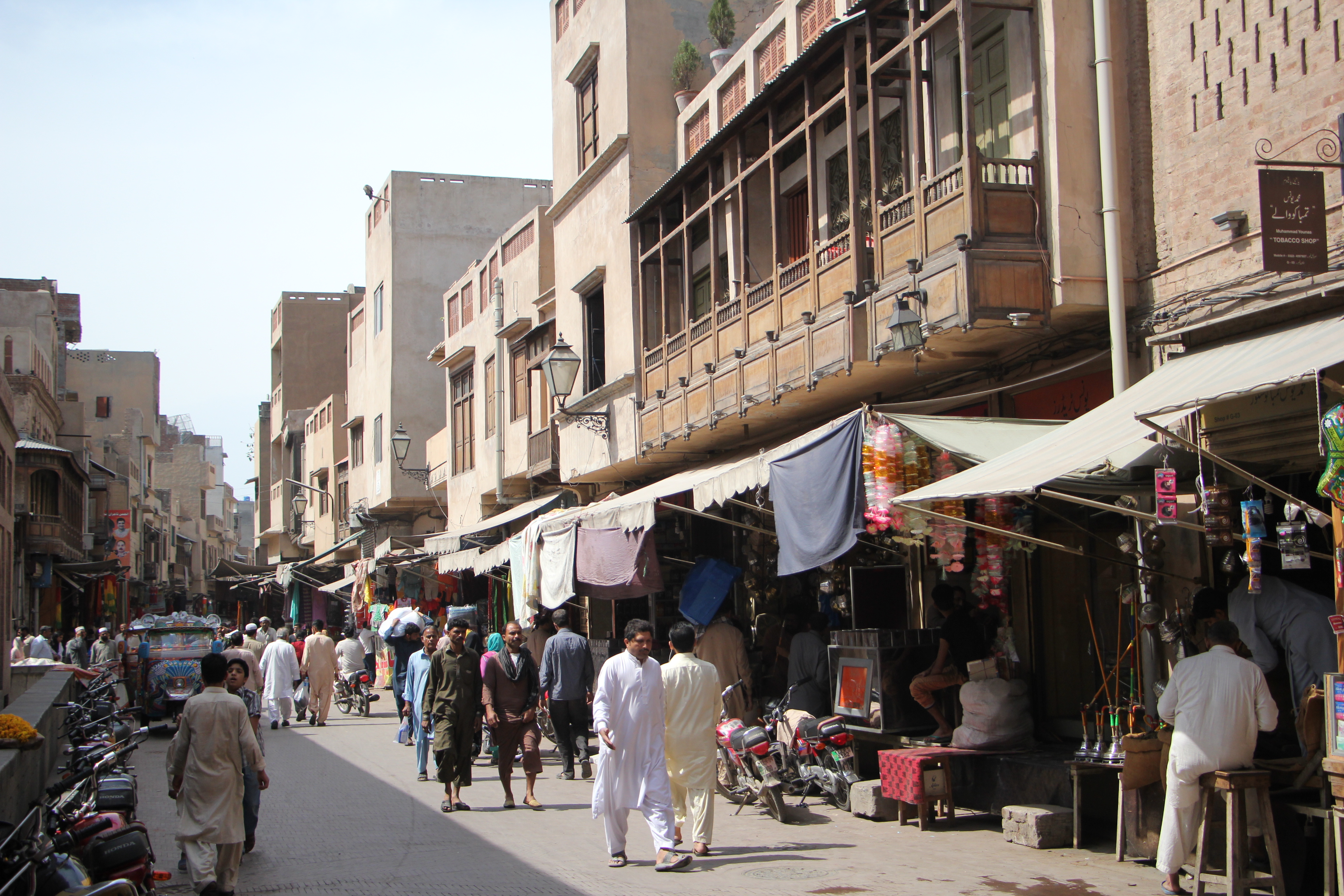
Façades along the first phase of the Shahi Guzargah project near Delhi Gate have been rehabilitated, while power lines were placed underground.

=== Shahi Guzargah Project ===
In 2012, the Pilot Urban Conservation and Infrastructure Improvement Project—the Shahi Guzargah Project was launched by the Government of Punjab and the Aga Khan Trust for Culture (an agency of the AKDN) which restored a section of Shahi Guzargah ("Royal Passage") between the Wazir Khan Mosque and Delhi Gate under the management of the Walled City of Lahore Authority. The project was completed in 2015 with support from the governments of Norway and the United States of America.

Prior to completion of the project's first phase, the vicinity around the Wazir Khan Mosque had been encroached upon by illegally erected shops which blocked off much of the mosque from the surrounding neighbourhood. Tangled power lines further spoiled views of the mosque, and the Wazir Khan Chowk had been badly neglected and had shrunk in size due to illegally constructed shops. The first phase of the project removed illegally constructed shops, restoring views of the mosque. Wazir Khan Chowk was extensively rehabilitated by the removal of encroachments, while the well of Dina Nath was restored. Power lines along the project corridor were also placed underground, and the Chitta Gate at the eastern entrance to Wazir Khan Chowk was rehabilitated.

== Historic suburbs ==
- Anarkali
- Shahdara Bagh
- Mughalpura
- Baghbanpura
- Gawalmandi

== See also ==
- Lahore
- Lahore Fort
- Badshahi Mosque
- Suneri Mosque
- Wazir Khan Mosque
- Fakir Khana
- Fort Road, Lahore
- Fort Road Food Street, a food street in the walled city serving Lahori food
- Shaheed Ganj Mosque
- Naulakha Bazaar
- lunda Bazar
- Shahi Hamam
