= Sunehri Mosque, Lahore =

Mosque in Lahore, Punjab, Pakistan

Sunehri Mosque
- سنہری مسیت سنہری مسجد
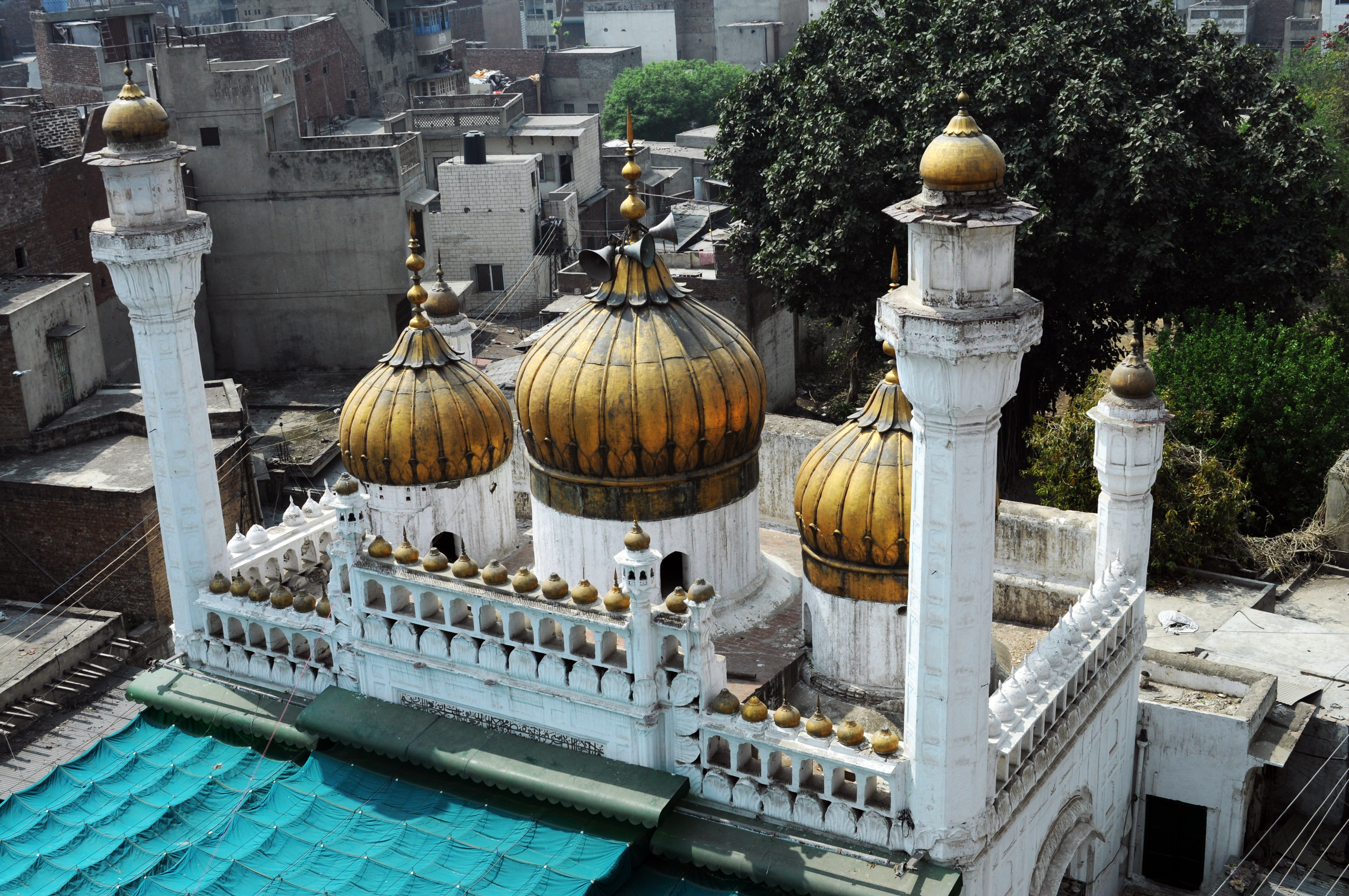

Religion
- Affiliation: Islam
- Branch/tradition: Sunni

Location
- Location: Lahore, Punjab, Pakistan
- Interactive map of Sunehri Mosque
- Coordinates: 31°34′59″N 74°19′11″E

Architecture
- Type: mosque
- Style: Indo-Islamic, Mughal
- Completed: 1753; 273 years ago

Specifications
- Minaret: 4
- Minaret height: 54 metres (177 ft)
- Materials: brick, marble

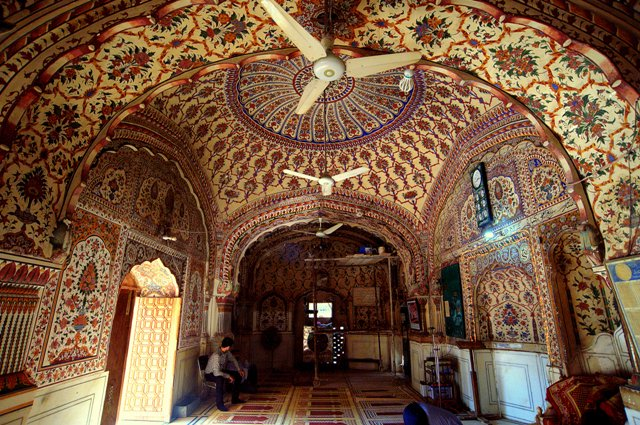
The mosque's interior is ornately embellished with Mughal-era frescoes.

The Sunehri Mosque (Punjabi: سنہری مسیت, romanised: Sunahirī Masīt; Urdu: سنہری مسجد , romanised: Sunehrī Masjid, lit. 'The Golden Mosque'), also known as the Talai Mosque, is a late Mughal architecture-era mosque in the Walled City of Lahore, capital of the Pakistani province of Punjab.

== Location ==
Sunehri Mosque is located in the Walled City of Lahore.

== History ==
Unlike the Wazir Khan Mosque and Badshahi Mosque which were built at the zenith of the Mughal Empire in the 17th century, the Sunehri Mosque was built in 1753 when the empire was in decline.

The architect of the mosque was Nawab Bukhari Khan, deputy governor of Lahore during the reign of Muhammad Shah. Local shopkeeper had objected to the construction of a large mosque in a congested area, so Bukhari Khan acquired a fatwa from local religious leaders in order for construction to begin.

After Ranjit Singh captured Lahore in 1799, the mosque came under Sikh control and was temporarily used for non-Islamic purposes, which caused grief among the Muslim population. Ranjit Singh later returned the mosque to Muslims, restoring it for Islamic worship, and donated gold for its domes, giving the mosque its famous golden (sunehri) domes. This act reflected his policy of religious accommodation and respect for different faiths.

== Architecture ==
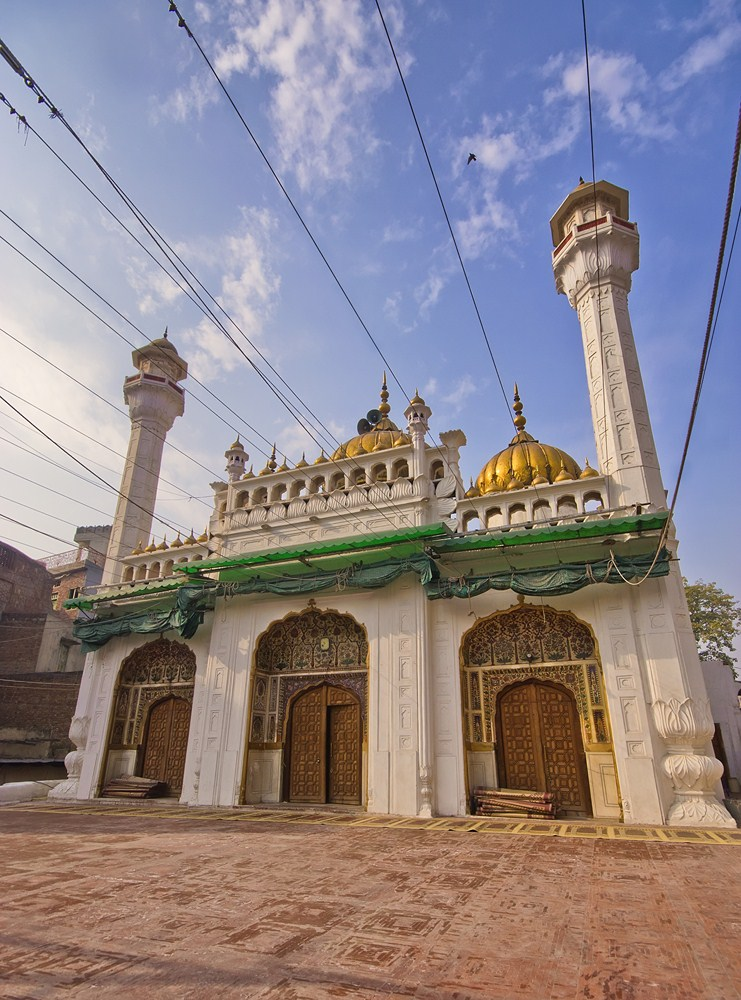
A view of the prayer hall from the mosque's inner courtyard

The mosque was built on a plinth elevated 11 feet off of the bazaar's surface, with shops occupying the ground floor beneath the mosque. The shops' rents were used to pay for the mosque's upkeep. The architectural style of the mosque reflects influences of Sikh architecture from nearby Amritsar.

The staircase in front of the mosque has 16 steps, and opens up to a small courtyard measuring 65 feet by 43 feet. An ablution tank is in the centre of this courtyard. The prayer chamber measures 40 feet long, and 16 feet wide. The mosque has a gateway, which measures 21.3 metres in length and a courtyard that measures 161.5 by 160.6 metres (530 ft × 527 ft).The marble domes cover seven prayer chambers. Four lofty minarets stand at the four corners of the mosque, each with an outer circumference of 20 metres (66 ft), soaring up to 54 metres (177 ft).

== Conservation ==
In 2011, the Government of Punjab began a Rs. 5.78 million (US$21,000) project to restore the mosque with funding from the Ambassadors Fund for Cultural Preservation of the United States of America. Minarets were resurfaced while the domes were re-gilded, while new marble floors were installed.
