= Punjab Walled Cities and Heritage Areas Authority =

Walled City of Lahore Authority
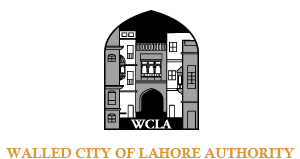
- Founded: 2012
- Headquarters: Lahore, Punjab, Pakistan
- Key people: Kamran Lashari (Director General)
- Website: www.walledcitylahore.gop.pk

The Walled City of Lahore Authority (Note: Punjabi: اندرون شہر لہور اتھارٹی; Urdu: مقتدرہ اندرون شہر لاہور) is a semi-governmental organisation established and funded by the Government of Punjab for the conservation, planning and development, regulation and management of the Walled City of Lahore, the historic fortified interior of Lahore in Punjab, Pakistan.

The organisation works autonomously and was established in 2012 after Provincial Assembly of the Punjab amended the Walled City of Lahore Bill 2011 to create the authority. It looks after the heritage sites in the area and specifies penalties for damaging buildings and runs the functions of the Old City of Lahore. The authority also helps promote cultural activities and tourism in Lahore.
