= Architecture of Lahore =

Overview of architecture in Lahore

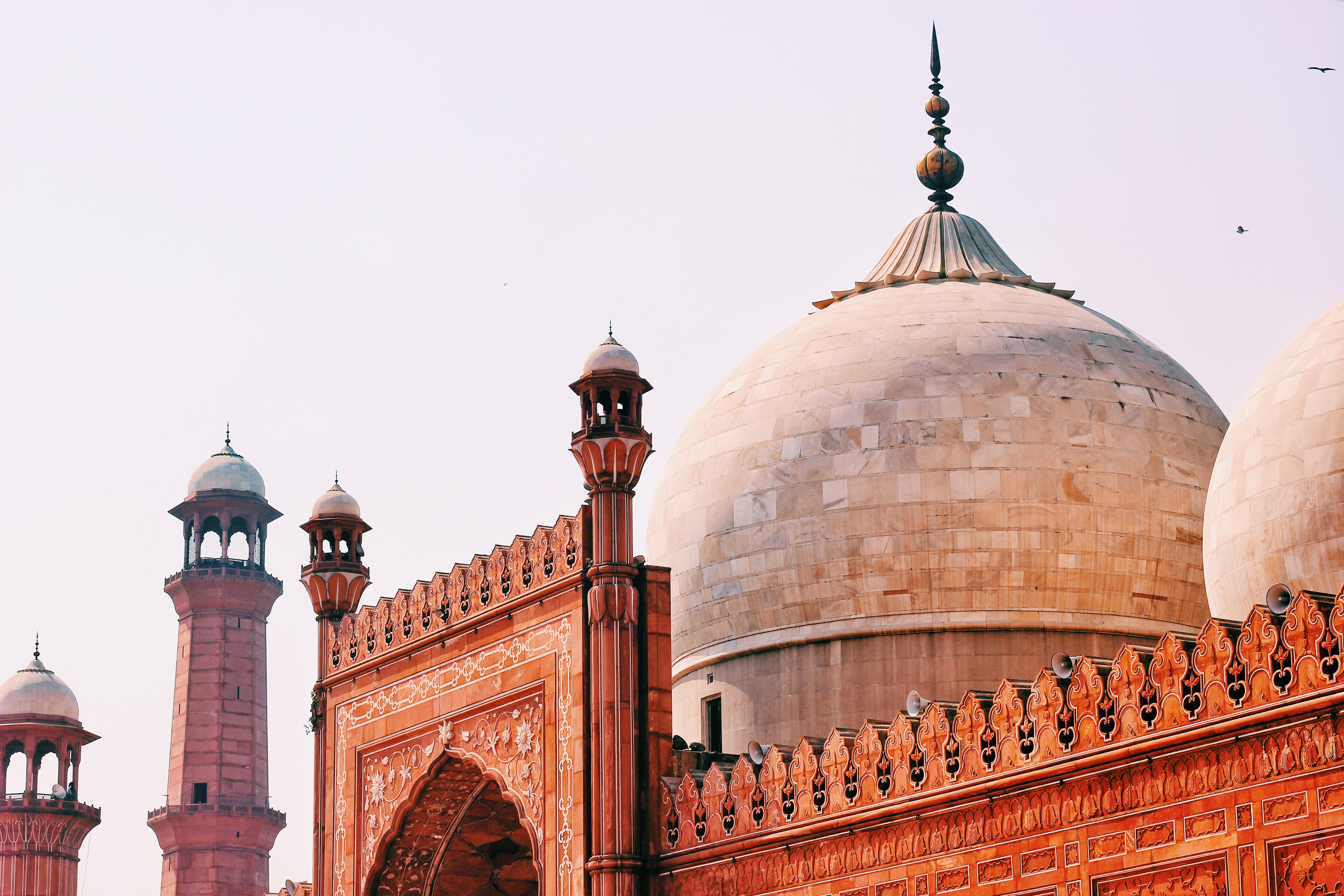
Badshahi Mosque is one of Lahore's most famous buildings

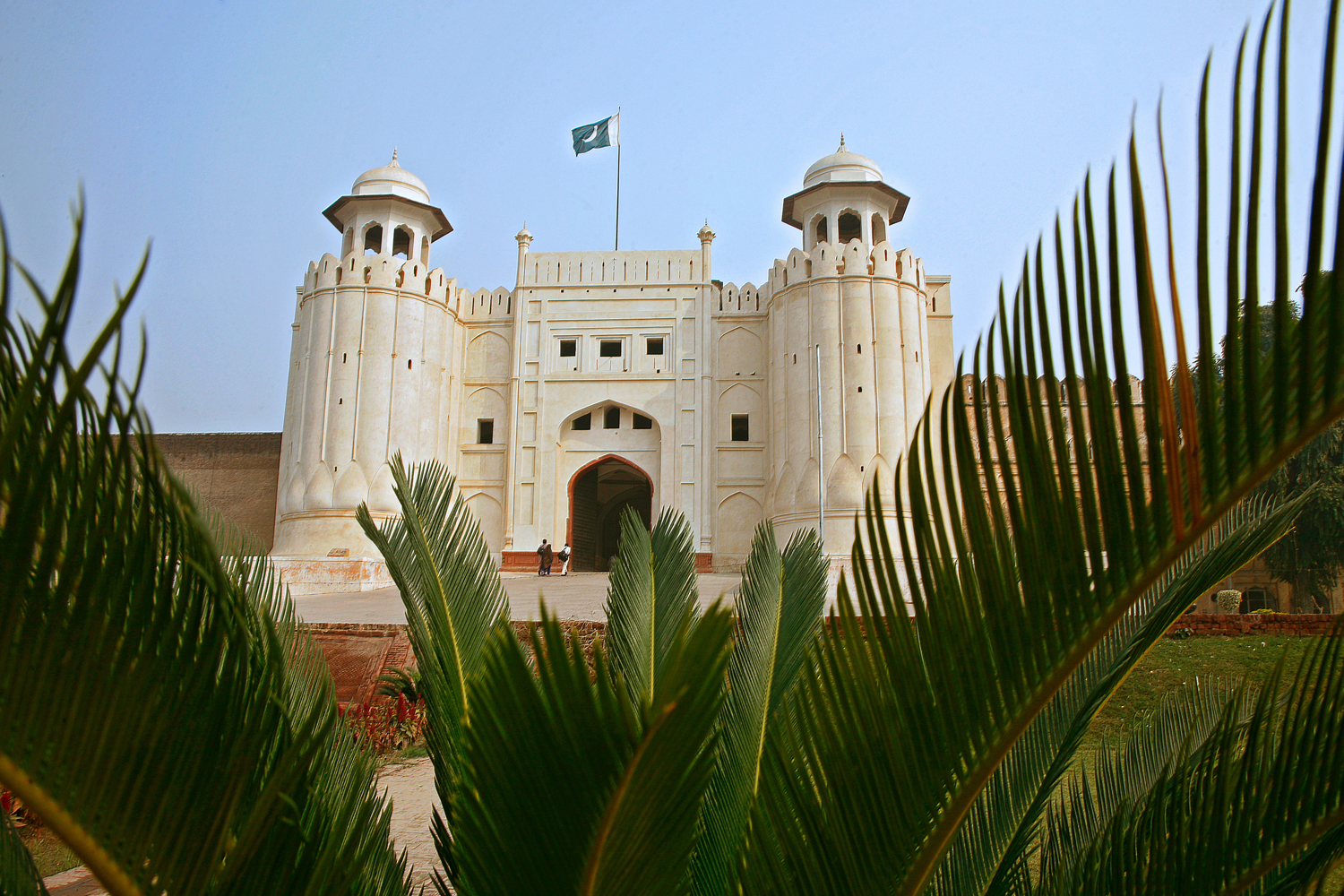
Alamgiri Gate at the Lahore Fort.

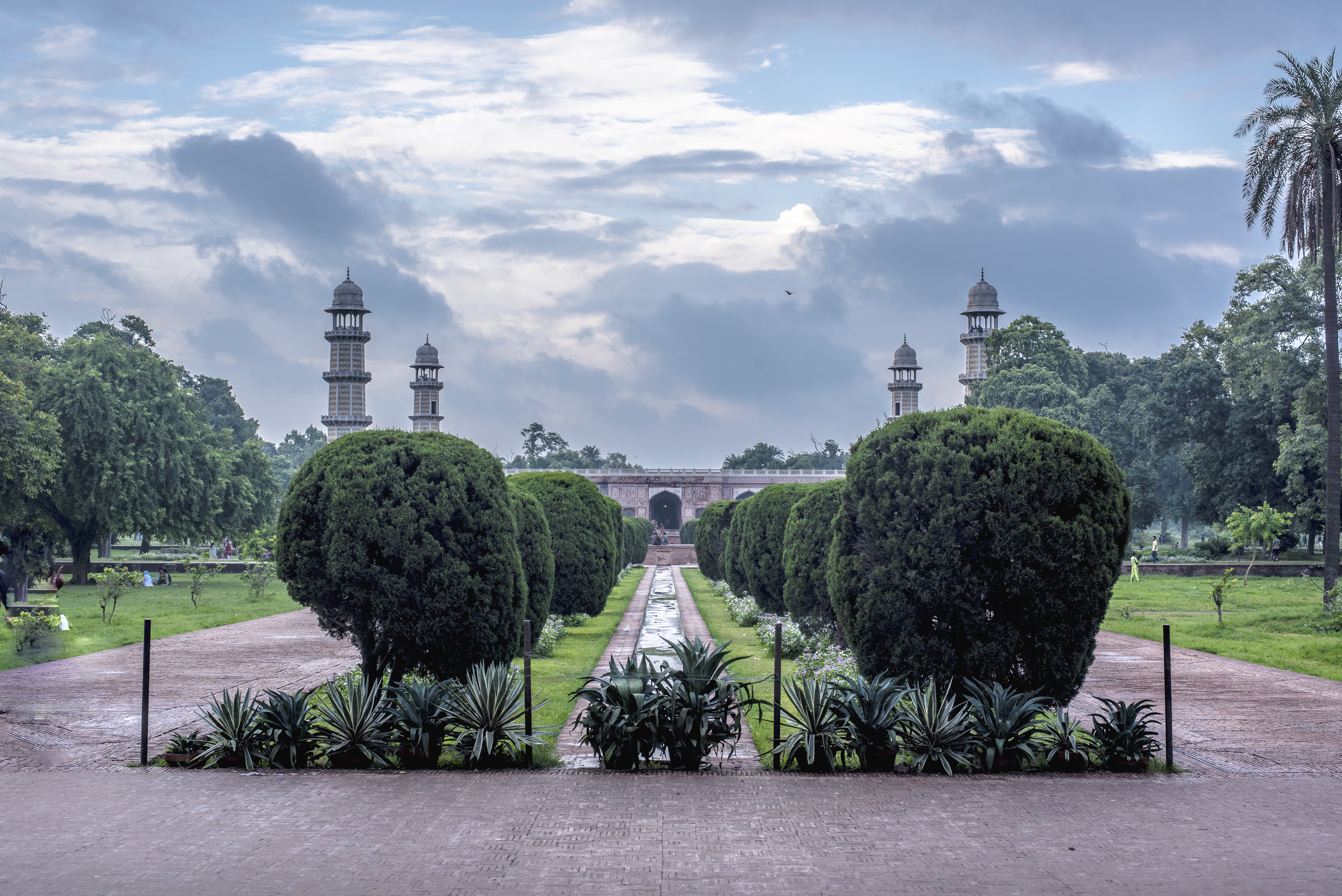
The Tomb of Jahangir is surrounded by a Persian-style Paradise garden or bagh.

The Architecture of Lahore reflects the history of Lahore and is remarkable for its variety and uniqueness. There are buildings left from the centuries of rule of the Mughal Empire, the Sikh Empire, as well as from the era of the British Raj, whose style is a mixture of Victorian and Islamic architecture often referred to as Indo-Saracenic. In addition, there are newer buildings which are very modern in their design. Unlike the emphasis on functional architecture in the west, much of Lahore's architecture has always been about making a statement as much as anything else.

The old city houses a number of examples of architecture of Lahore, which have a strong influence of the Mughal style. Department of archaeology has excavated many architectural remains of the buildings that were built during the rule of Rama of Ayodhya. Thus it can be said that though many buildings of Lahore carry Muslim heritage, they also have the influence of other religions such as Sikhism, Hinduism, Jainism and Zoroastrianism.

Lahori architecture also includes the thirteen gates, through which one can enter the city from various directions. Some of the gates are known as Raushnai Gate, Masti Gate, Yakki Gate, Kashmiri Gate, Khizri Gate, Shah Burj Gate, Akbari Gate and Lahori Gate. Some of the other significant buildings of Lahore built during the Mughal rule are Jahangir's Quadrangle, Maktab Khana, Khilwat Khana, Picture Wall, Kala Burj and Hathi Paer.

Lahore architecture consists of a few mosques as well. An atypical style of all the major buildings was that they were surrounded by beautiful gardens.

== Walled city ==
The walled city of Lahore is situated next to the river Ravi, which helped the city develop economically, demographically and culturally. Trade, food and communication, were all made possible due to the strategic location of the city. The old city is the reminiscent of the past glory of Lahore and the new city gives a prospectus of its bright and prosperous future. The city is built in the shape of a parallelogram and the area within the walls is about 1.87 square kilometres (461 acres). It is slightly elevated hence protecting it from destruction and any outside invasion. Mughal emperor Akbar during his stay in Lahore built a brick wall around the city to protect it. Since the walls had decayed over time, founder of Sikh Empire, Ranjit Singh rebuilt these walls and added a deep broad ditch around. This ditch was further filled with fine gardens, and encircled the city on every side except the north. Access to the city was possible through the thirteen gateways.

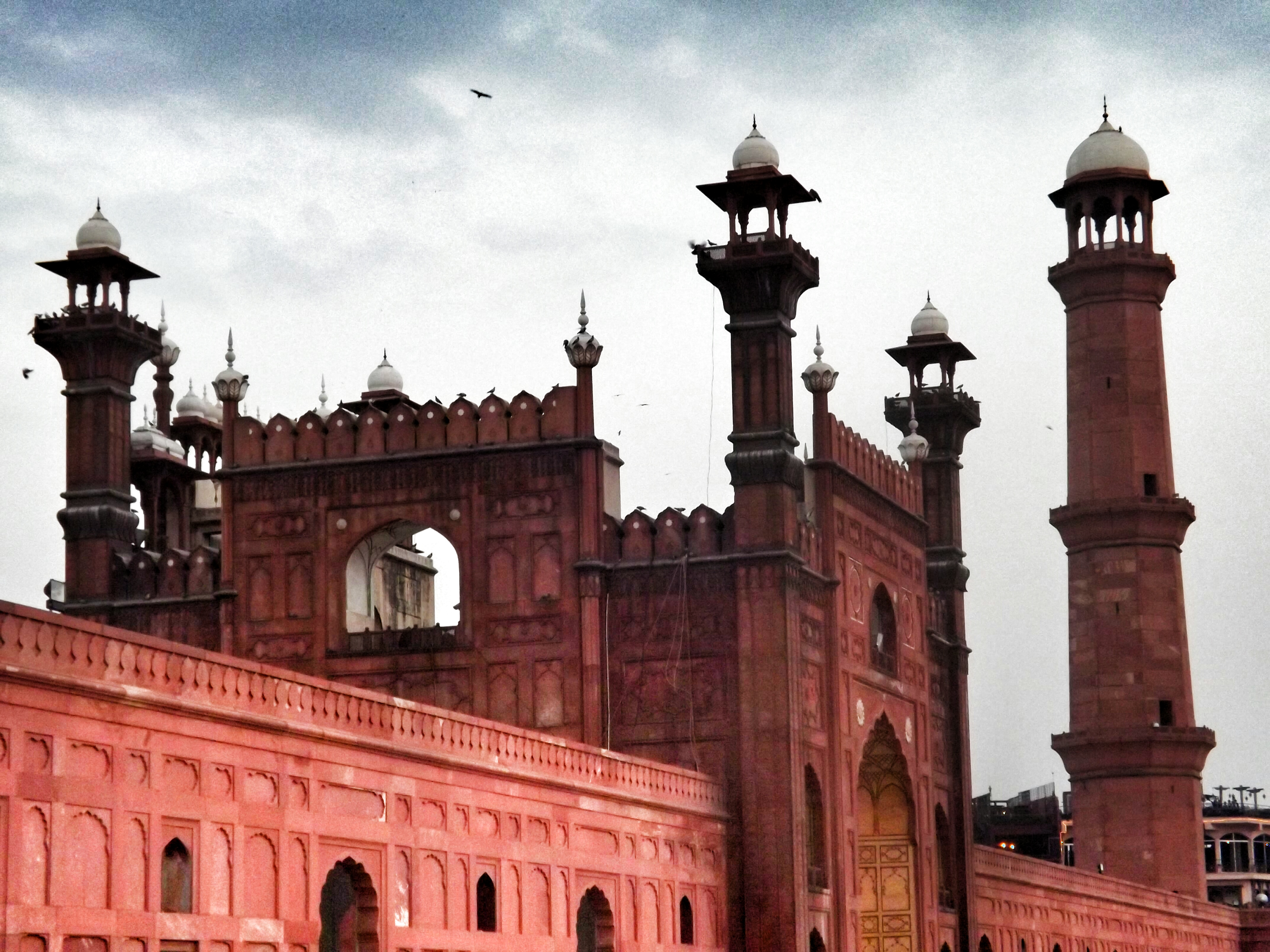
Main Entrance of Badshahi Mosque

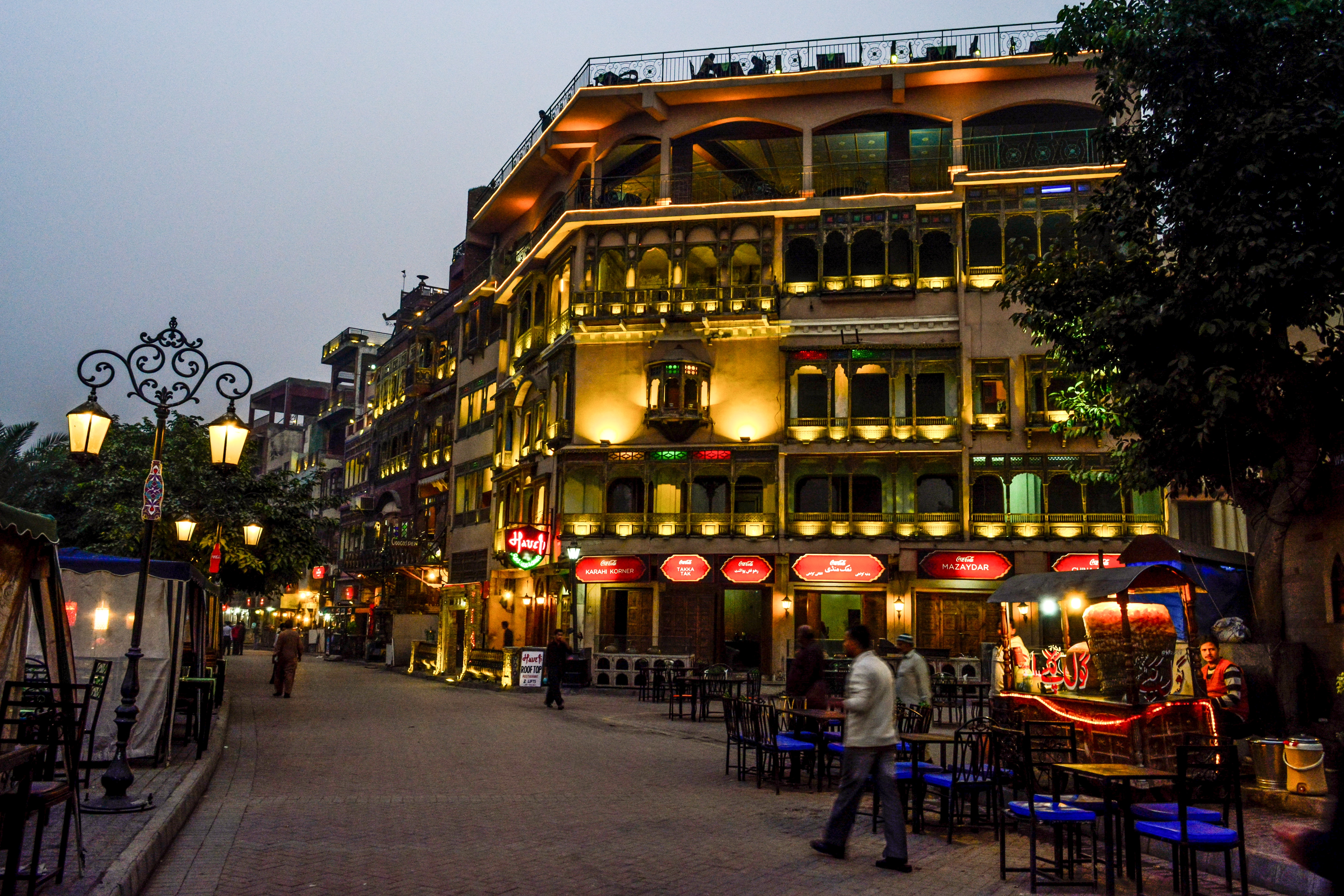
Food street at the Lahore Fort

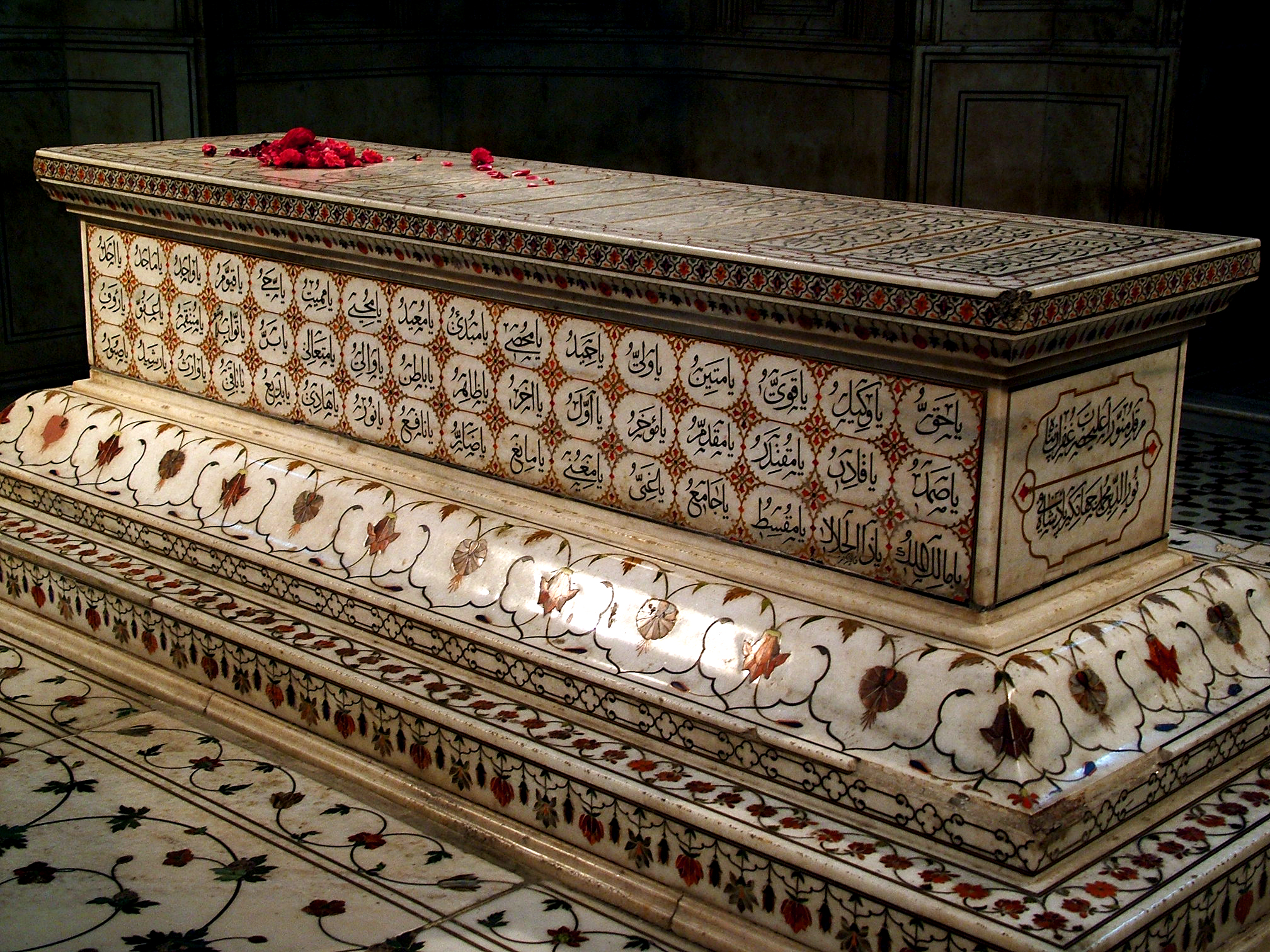
Jehangir's tomb

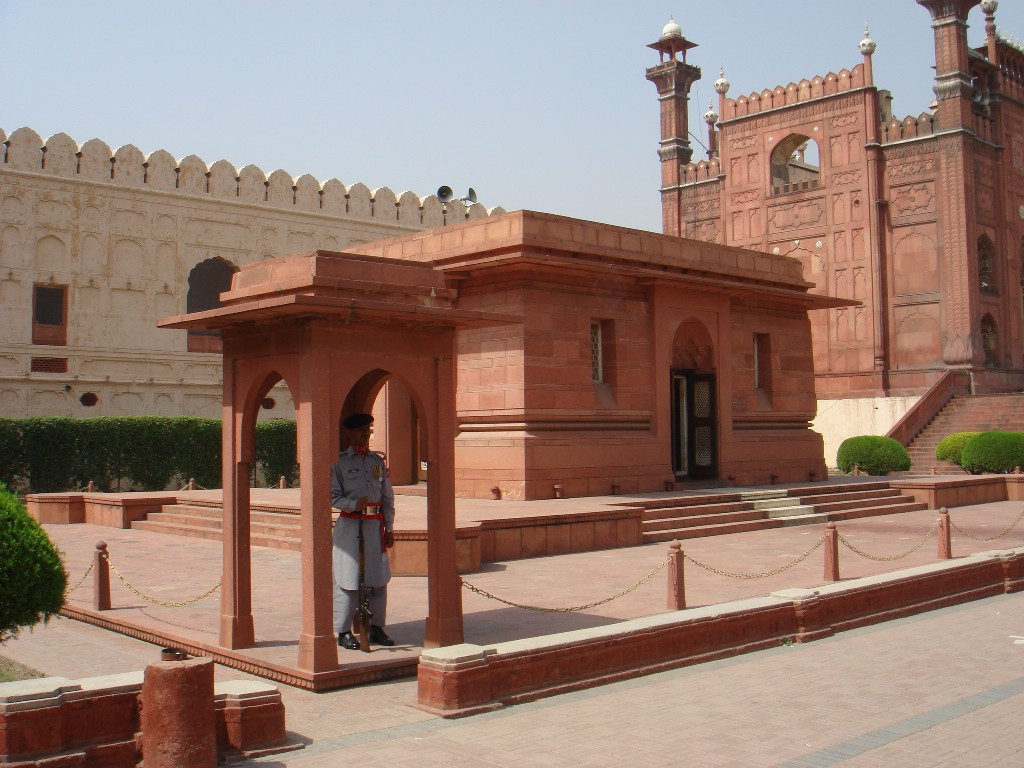
Allama Sir Muhammad Iqbal's tomb

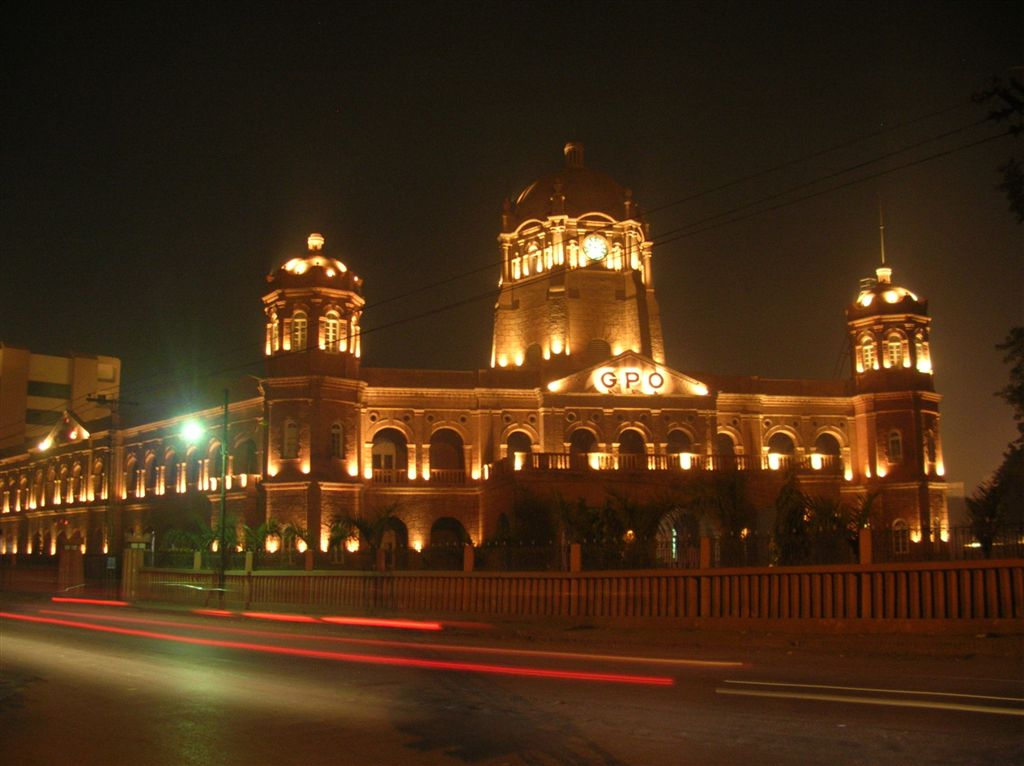
GPO on Mall road

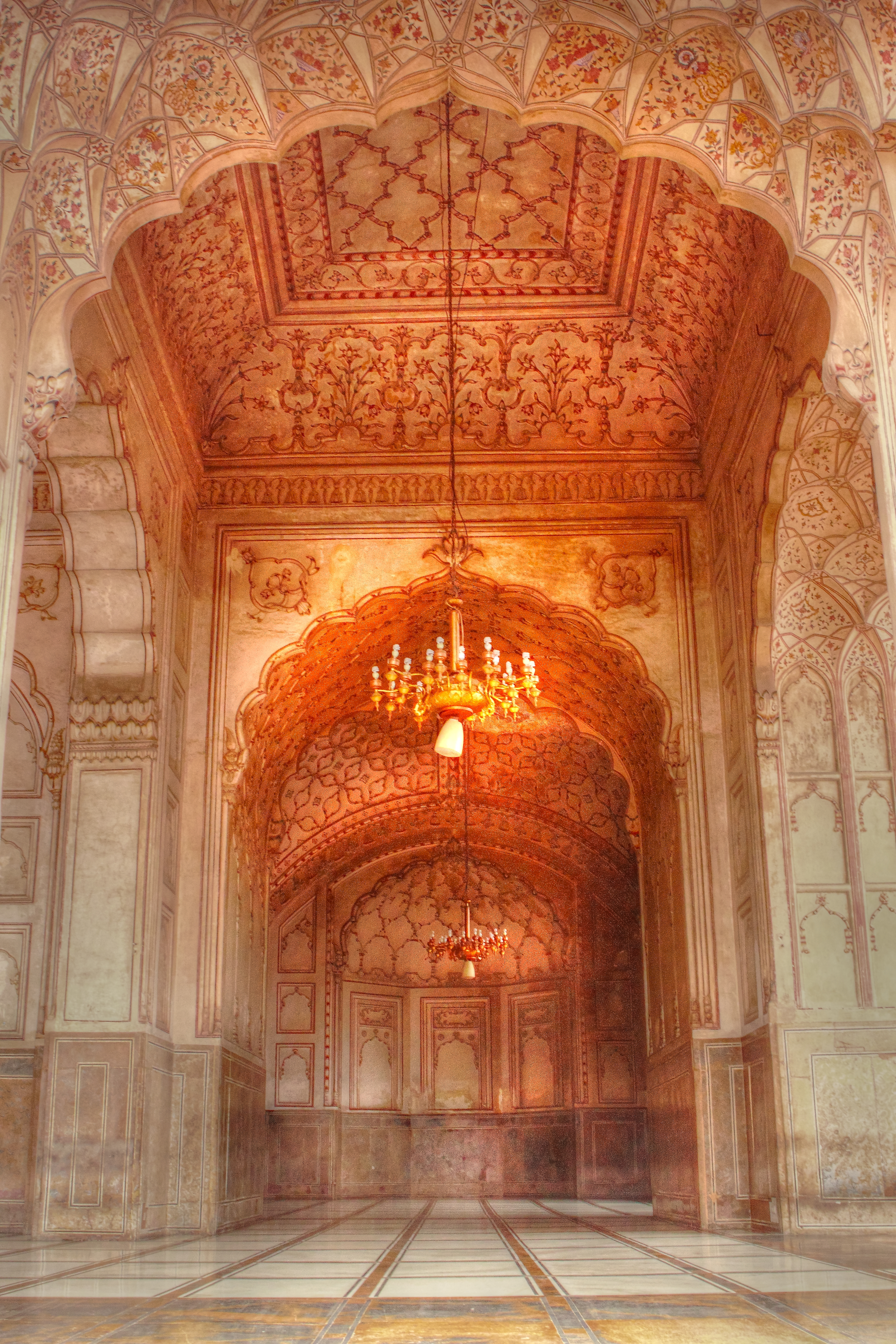
Interior of Badshahi Mosque

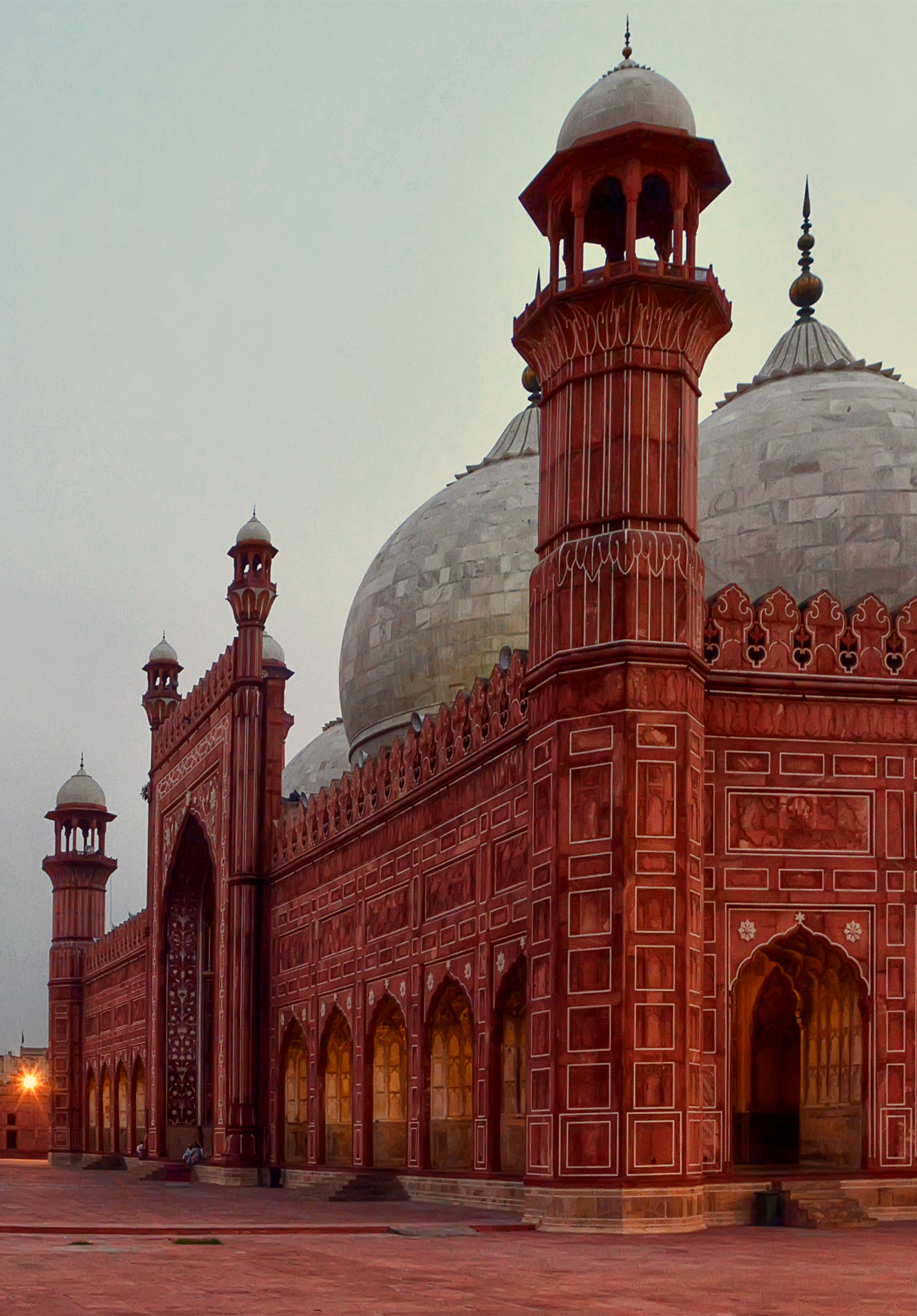
Badshahi Mosque

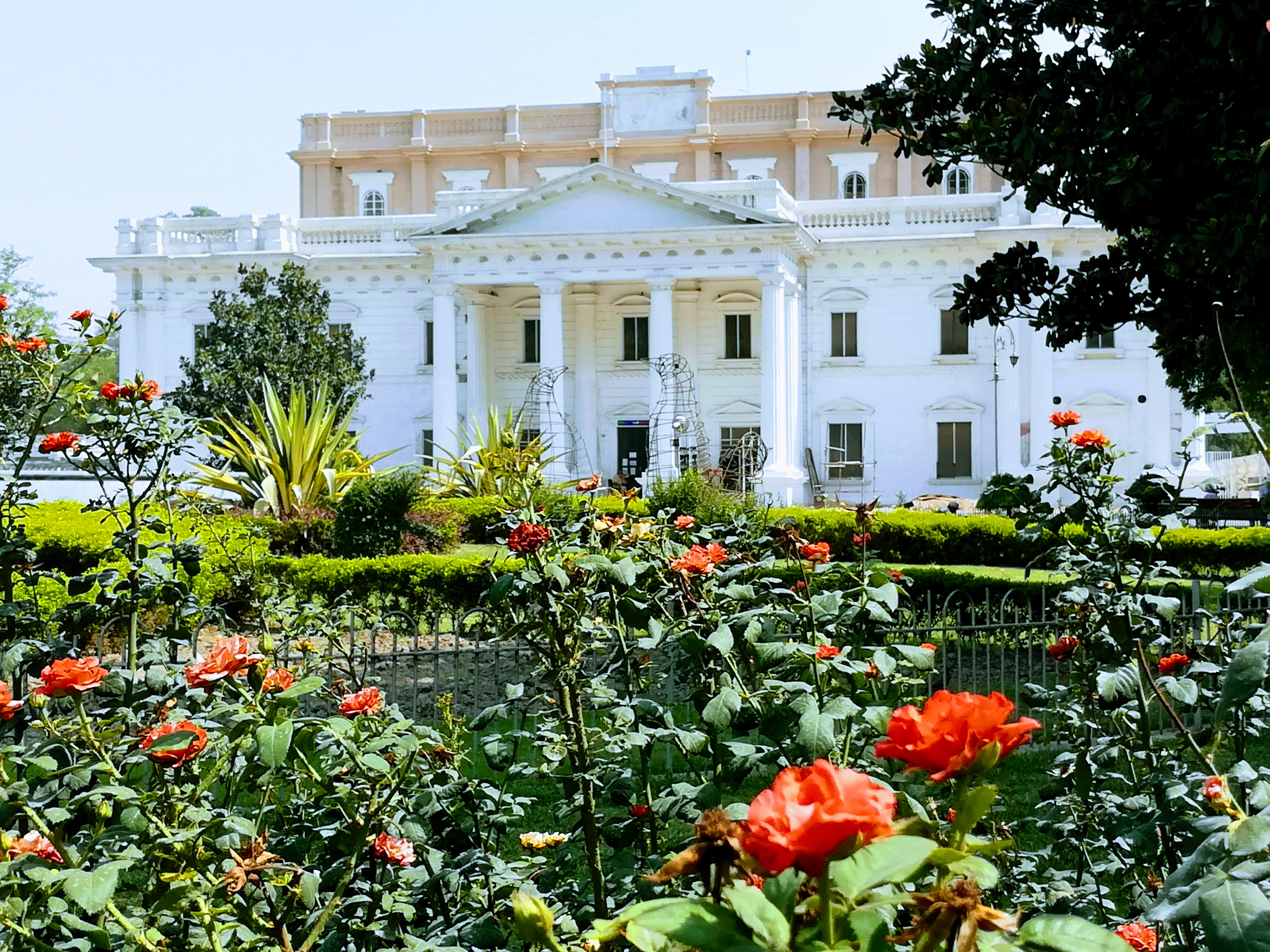
Quaid-e-Azam Library

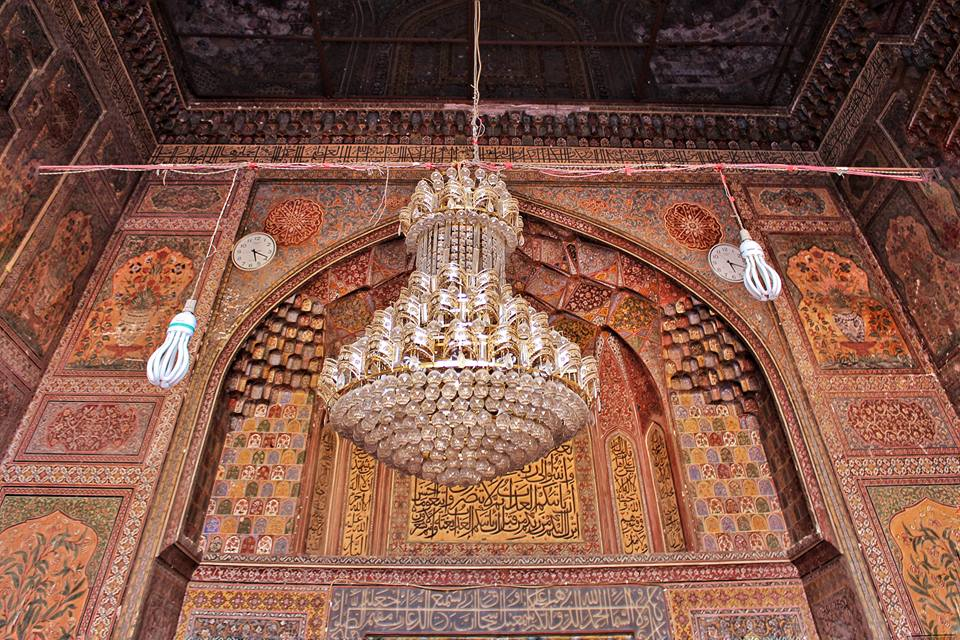
Interior of Wazir Khan Mosque

=== Surviving gates ===
| Name | Picture | Description |
|---|---|---|
| Bhati Gate | | The entrance to the "Bhati Gate" is located on the western wall of the old city. The area inside the gate is well known throughout the city for its food. Just outside "Bhati Gate" is the Data Durbar, the mausoleum of the Sufi saint Ali Hajweri (also known as Data Sahib Ganjbaksh). Every Thursday evening Na`at Readers and Qawawals (who perform Qawwali) gather here to read Na`at and perform religious Qawwali. |
| Delhi Gate | | The "Delhi Gate" was once the main and only road that led from Lahore to Delhi. The gate was built during the Mughal era. Although the gate suffered greatly in 1947 due to the riots caused by the partition of India, it has since been renovated and today is in its former glory. |
| Kashmiri Gate | | The "Kashmiri Gate" is so named because it faces the direction of Kashmir. Inside the gate, there is a shopping area called "Kashmiri Bazaar" and a girls' college. This college, built upon an old haveli belonging to a shah, is a beautiful example of Mughal architecture. |
| Lohari Gate | | The "Lohari Gate" is very close to "Bhati Gate." Like many other gates, it was built to keep enemies out. Although it is now surrounded by shops and stalls, it still has great architectural significance. In Urdu, loha means "iron," and the gate is named Lohari because many lohars (blacksmiths) workshops were based just outside this gate. |
| Roshnai Gate | | The "Roshnai Gate," also known as the "Gate of Lights," is located between the Lahore Fort and the Badshahi Mosque. As the gate was one of the main entrances into the city, it was constantly visited by Omerahs, courtiers, royal servants and retinues. In the evenings, the gate was lit up, hence its name. The gate was also referred to as the "Gate of Splendour." It is the only gate that is in good condition and still retains its original looks. |
| Shairanwala Gate | | The "Shairanwala Gate," also known as the "Gate of the Lions," was made by Maharaja Ranjit Singh. After its completion, Singh placed two live lions (or Shers) in cages at the gate as a symbolic gesture to warn any invader. |

== Mughal architecture ==
The Mughals ruled a population dominated by non-Muslims, mostly Hindus. Indigenous religions and traditions were tolerated and respected by the Mughal rulers. They were also incorporated into the arts, literature, music and architecture of the Mughal dynasty. During the 300-year rule of the Mughals, their attitudes towards indigenous cultures varied. With Akbar's arrival, there was a fusion of Hindu and Muslim styles and they are depicted in the various architectural innovations that he undertook.

Mughal architecture was the product of Indian, Islamic, Timurid and even European styles. The Mughal artists used these borrowed forms, in terms of symbolism and style, to fit in their own distinct style of architecture. According to Abul Fazl, the court chronicler, the Mughal forts and palaces were much more than imperial residences, they served as emblems of power and wealth, designed to dazzle the native rajas who attended their emperor's courts. Mughal emperors often demolished earlier structures to make space for new ones. Although they were proud of their heritage, each sought to mould the court in their own manner, and give his own reign a unique character. Apart from the forts and palaces, the two other most important types of Mughal buildings were the mosques and tombs. Both were used to provide a place of worship for Muslims.

Grand Islamic tombs had become popular at the time of the Mughals. These tombs commonly had entrances without doors, so that the interior was open to the outside air, and it had been suggested that this arrangement was devised to satisfy the law while evading its real meaning. Such attempts to reconcile artistic talent with religious tradition portray Islam as being devoid of artistic aspirations.

By an architectural point of view, therefore, Lahore is essentially a Mughal city, its golden period being by and large the period of Mughal rule. The Emperors added much to the city of Lahore, making it a beautiful and cultured city.

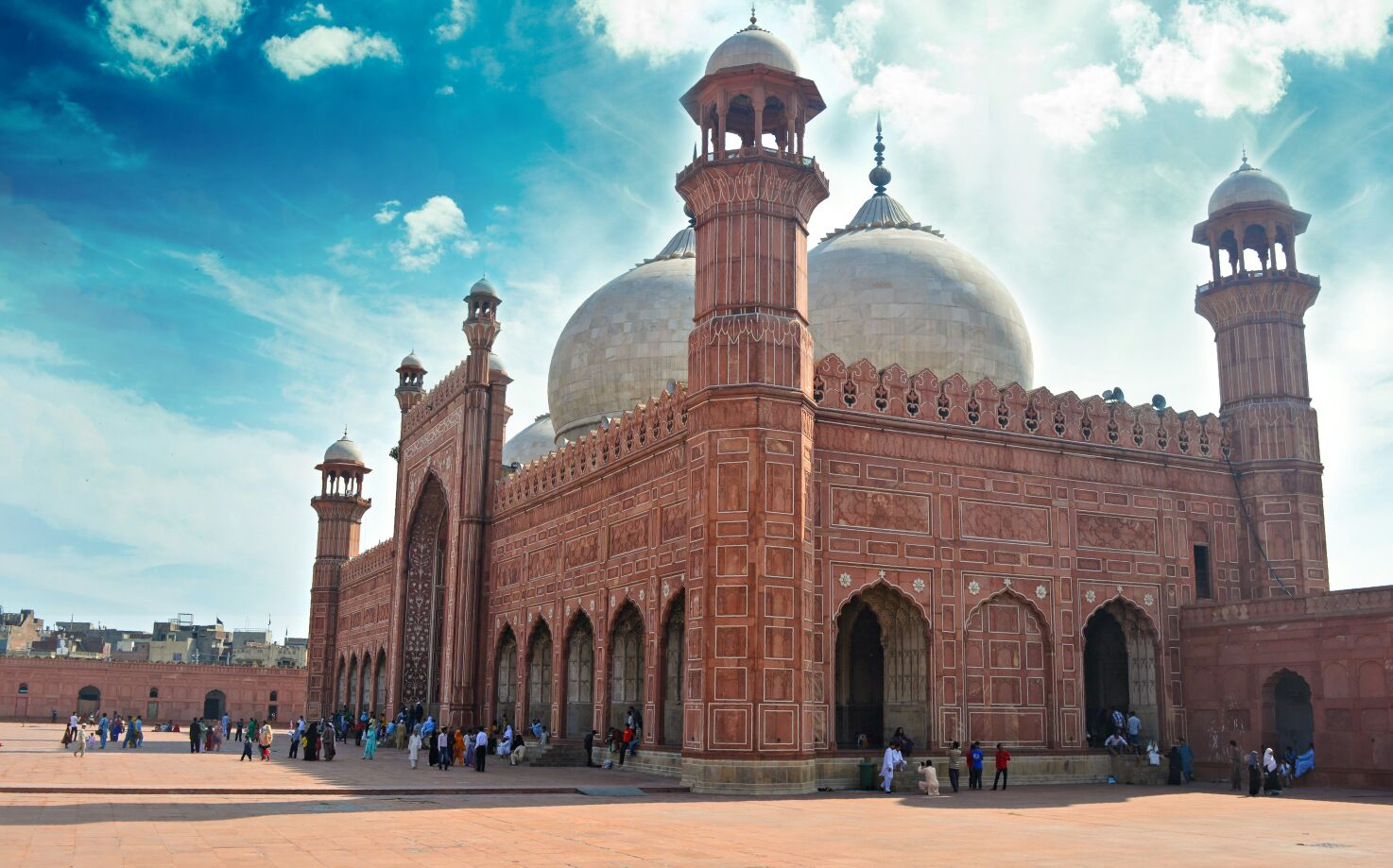
Badshahi Mosque

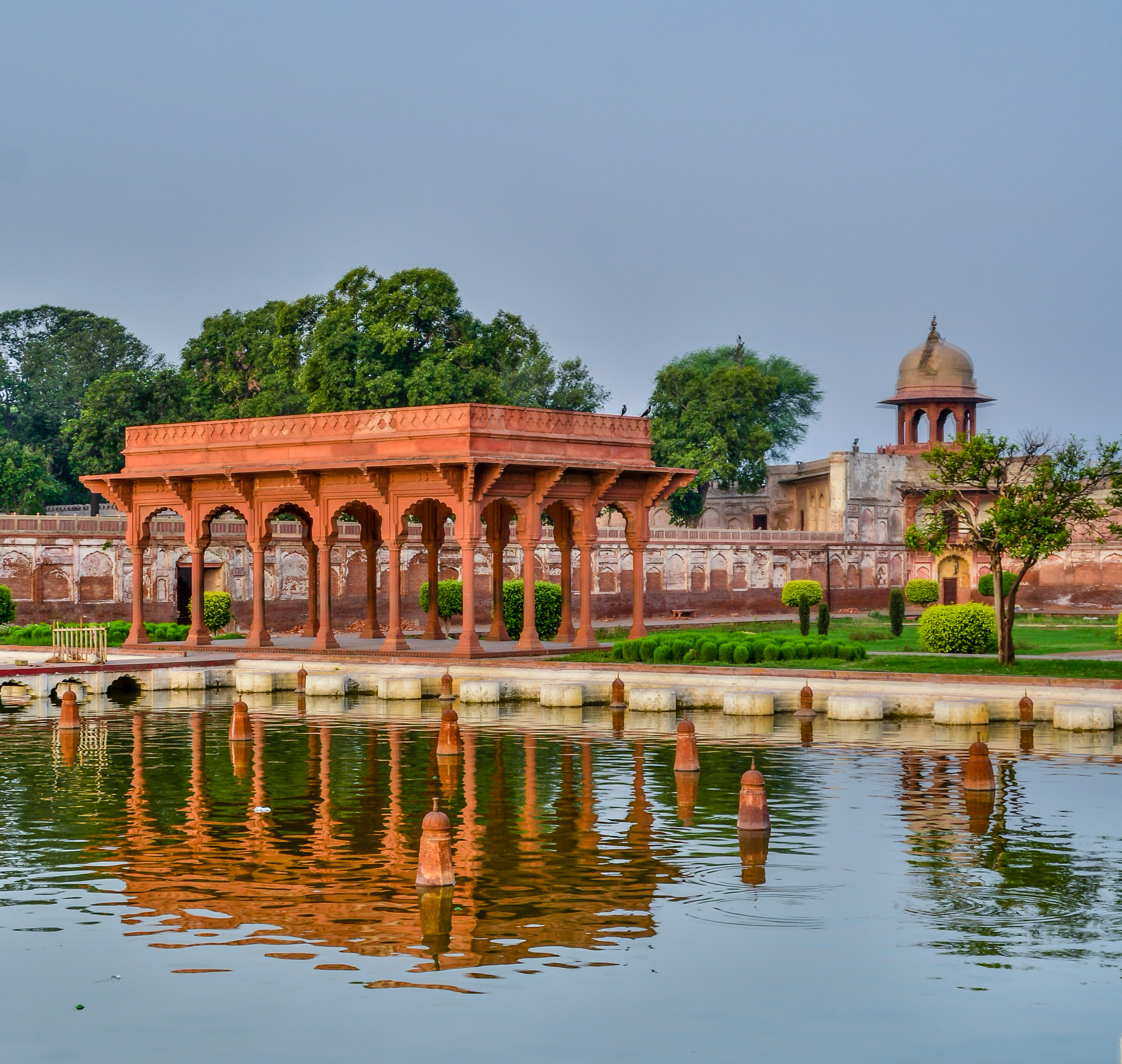
Shalimar Gardens

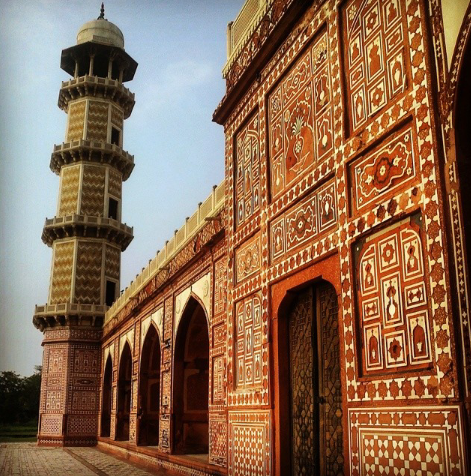
Tomb of Jahangir

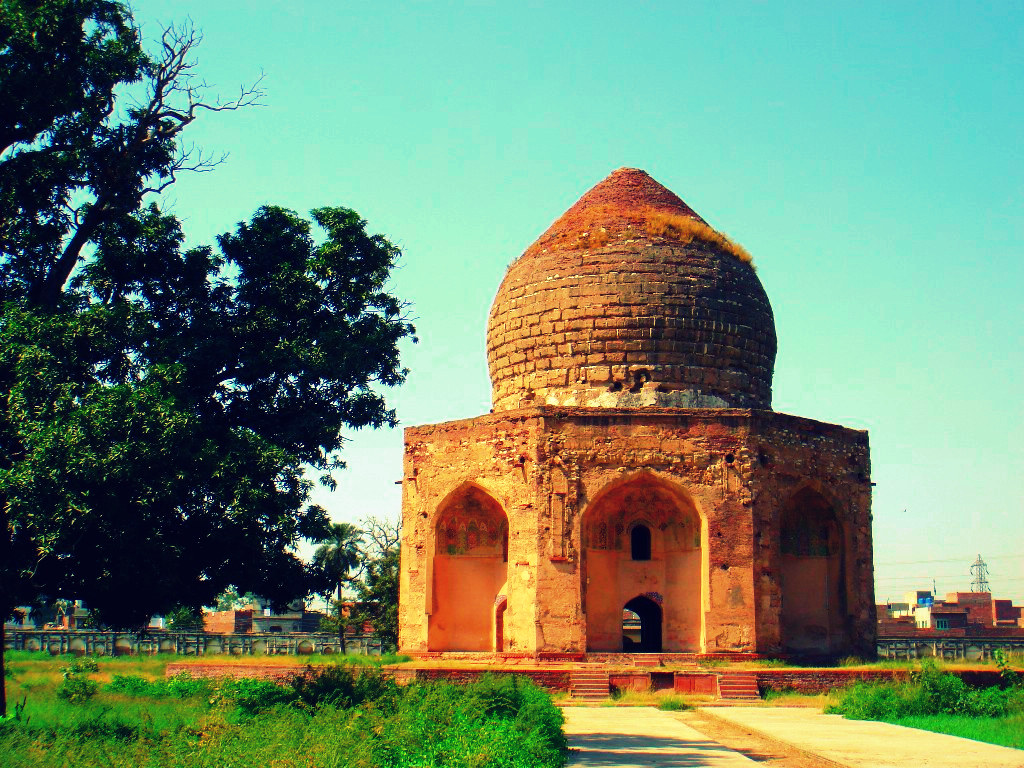
Tomb of Asif Khan

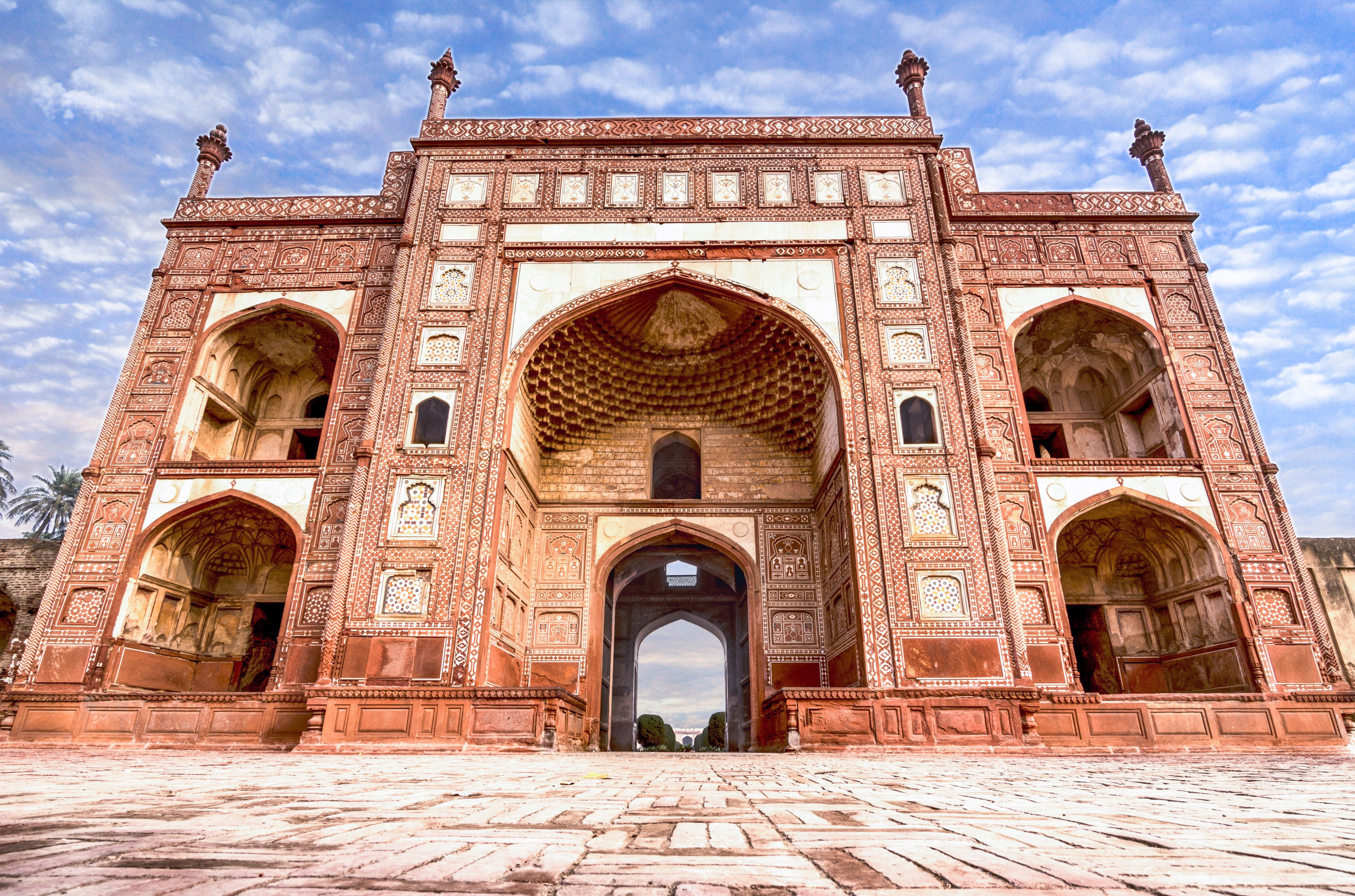
Akbari Sarai

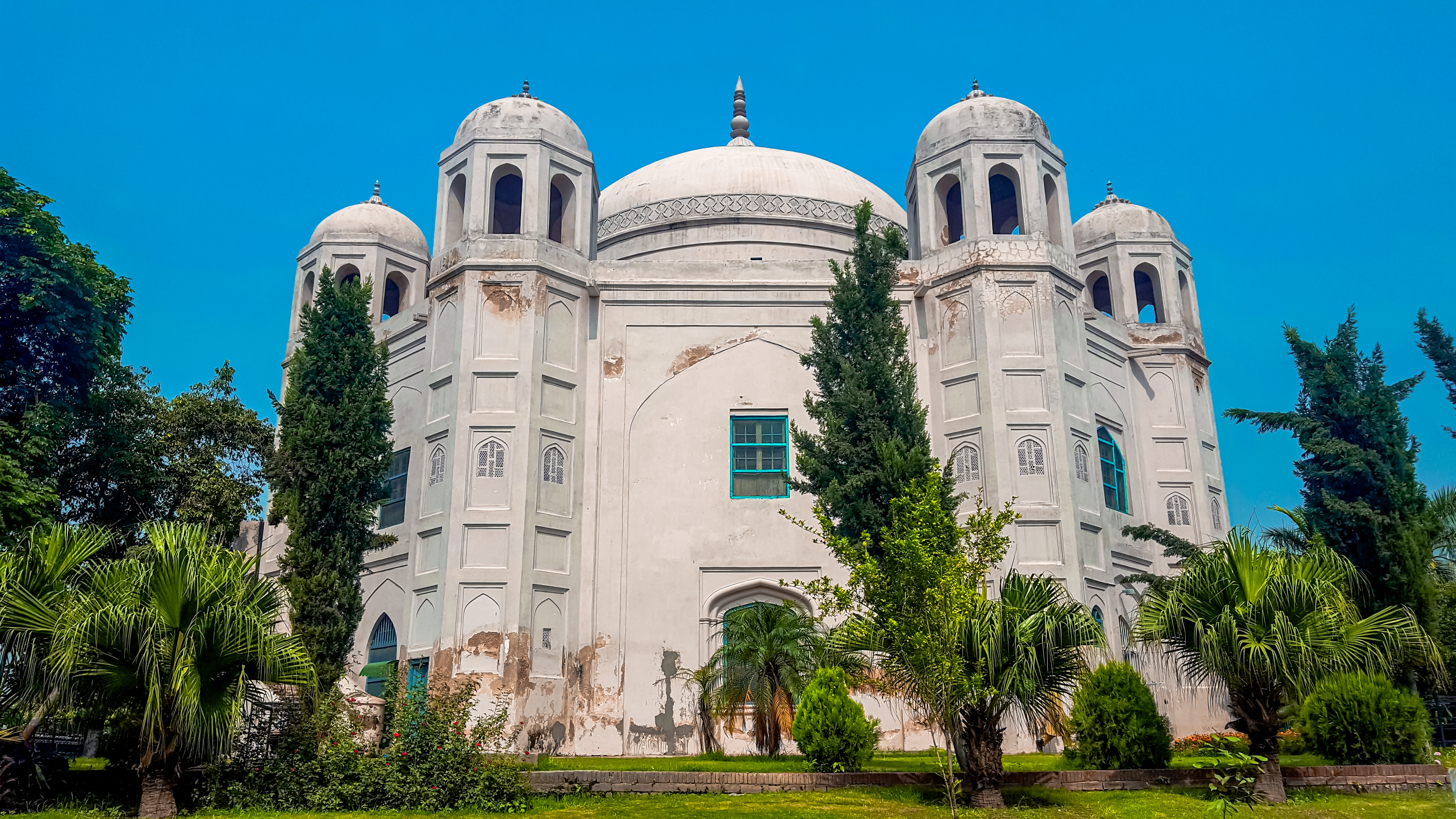
Tomb of Anarkali

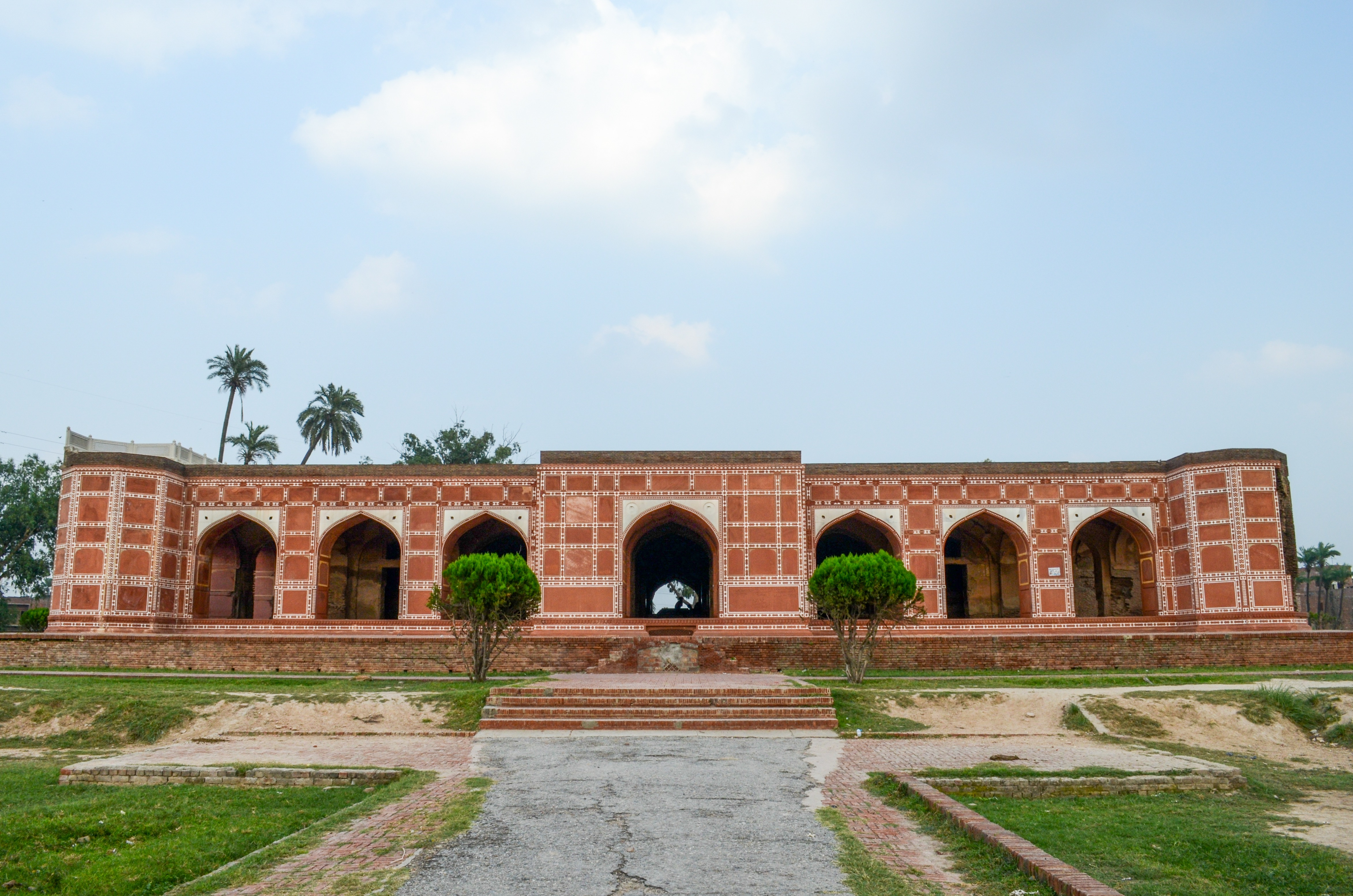
Tomb of Nur Jahan

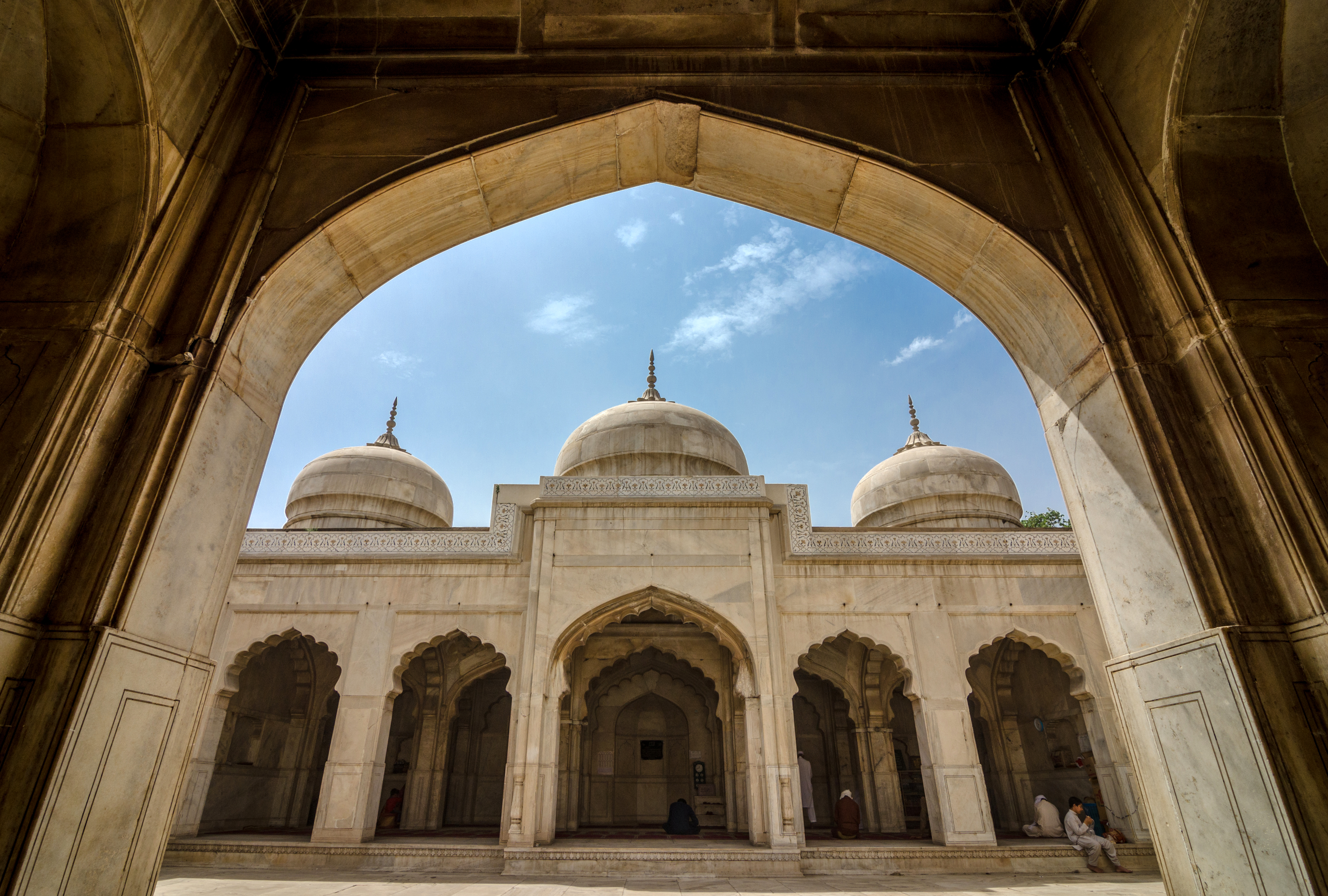
Moti Masjid

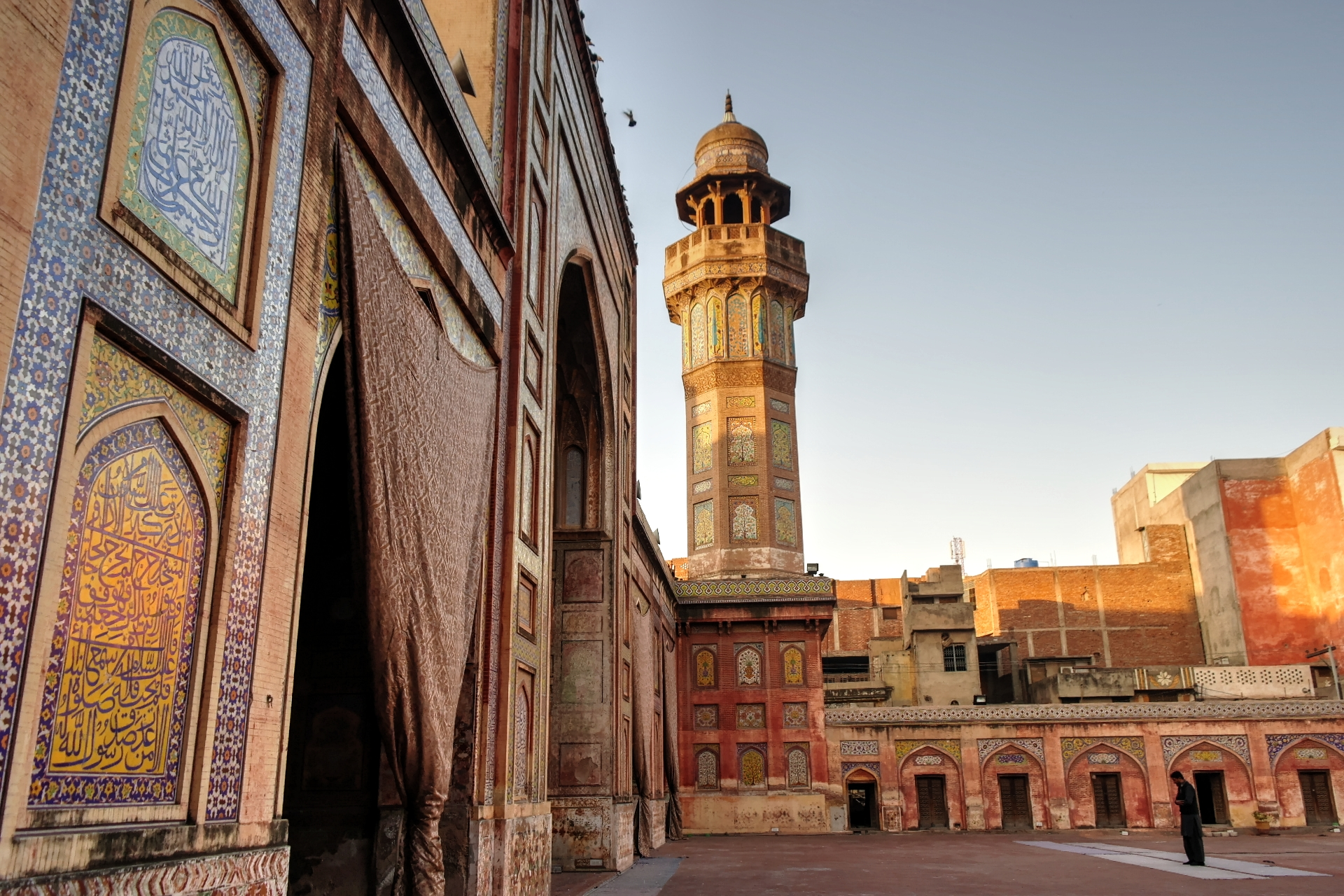
Wazir Khan Mosque

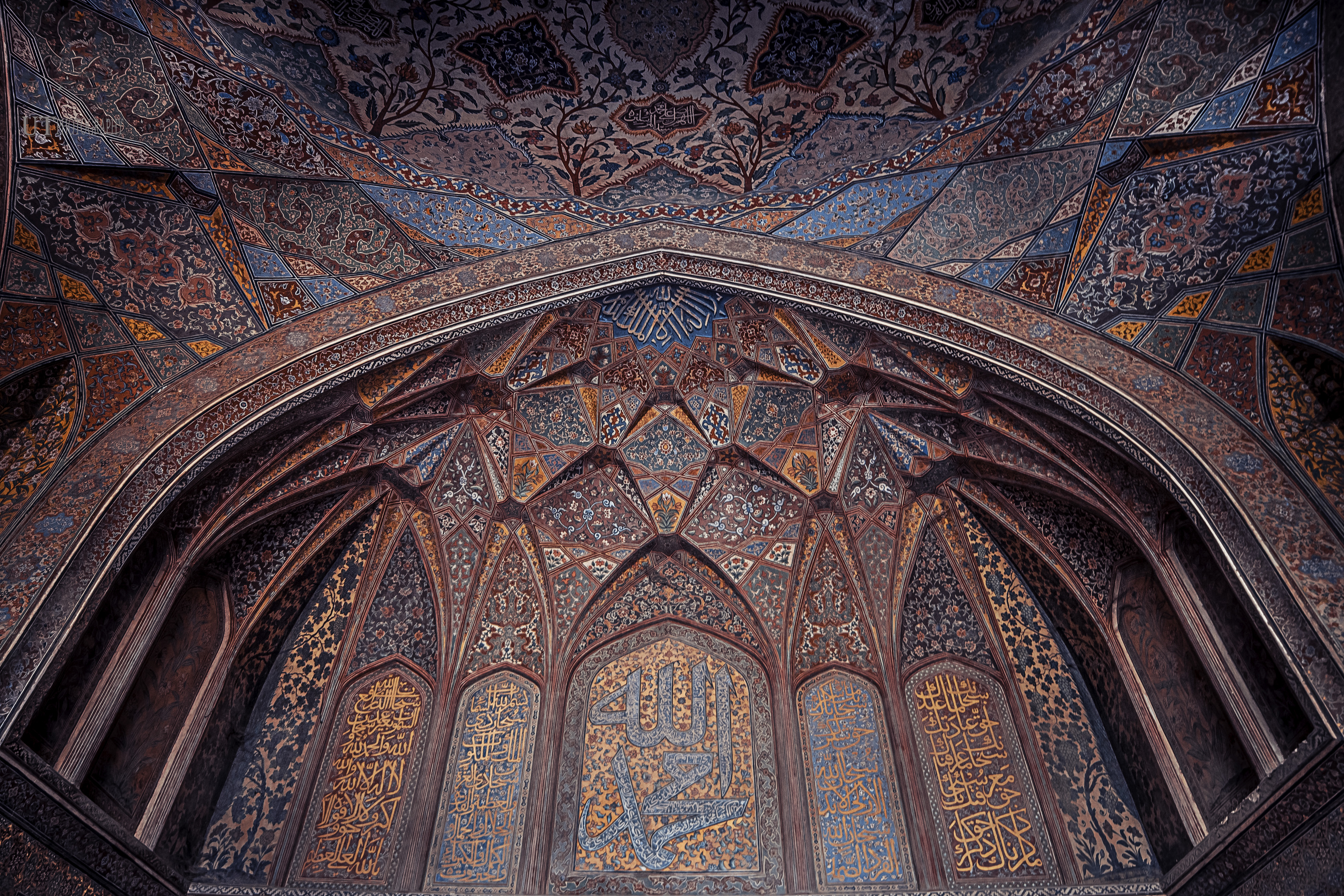
Wazir Khan Mosque intricate design

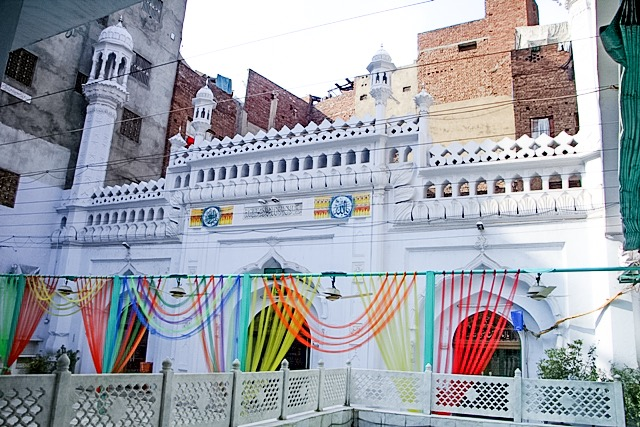
Neevin Mosque

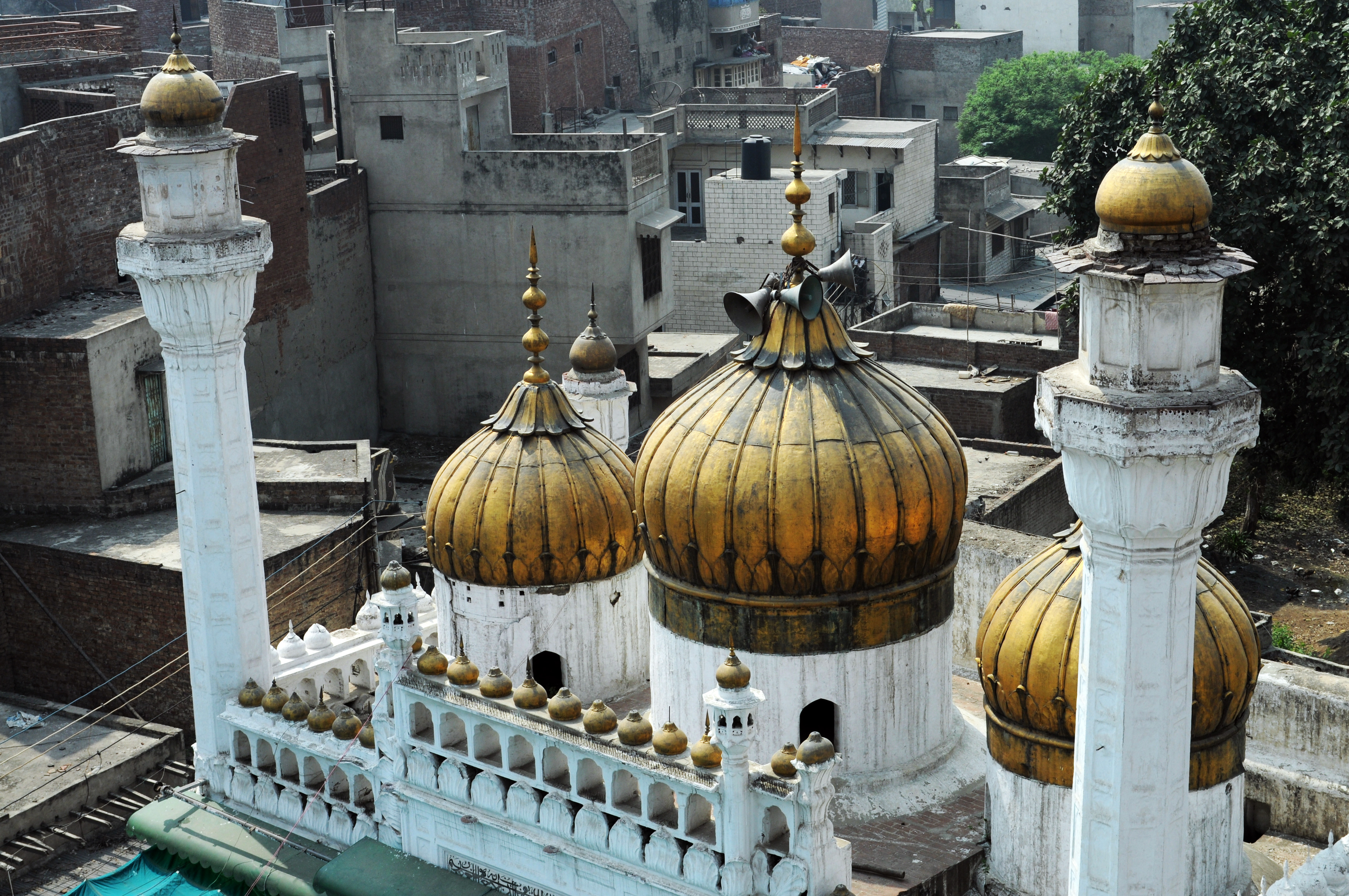
Sunehri Mosque

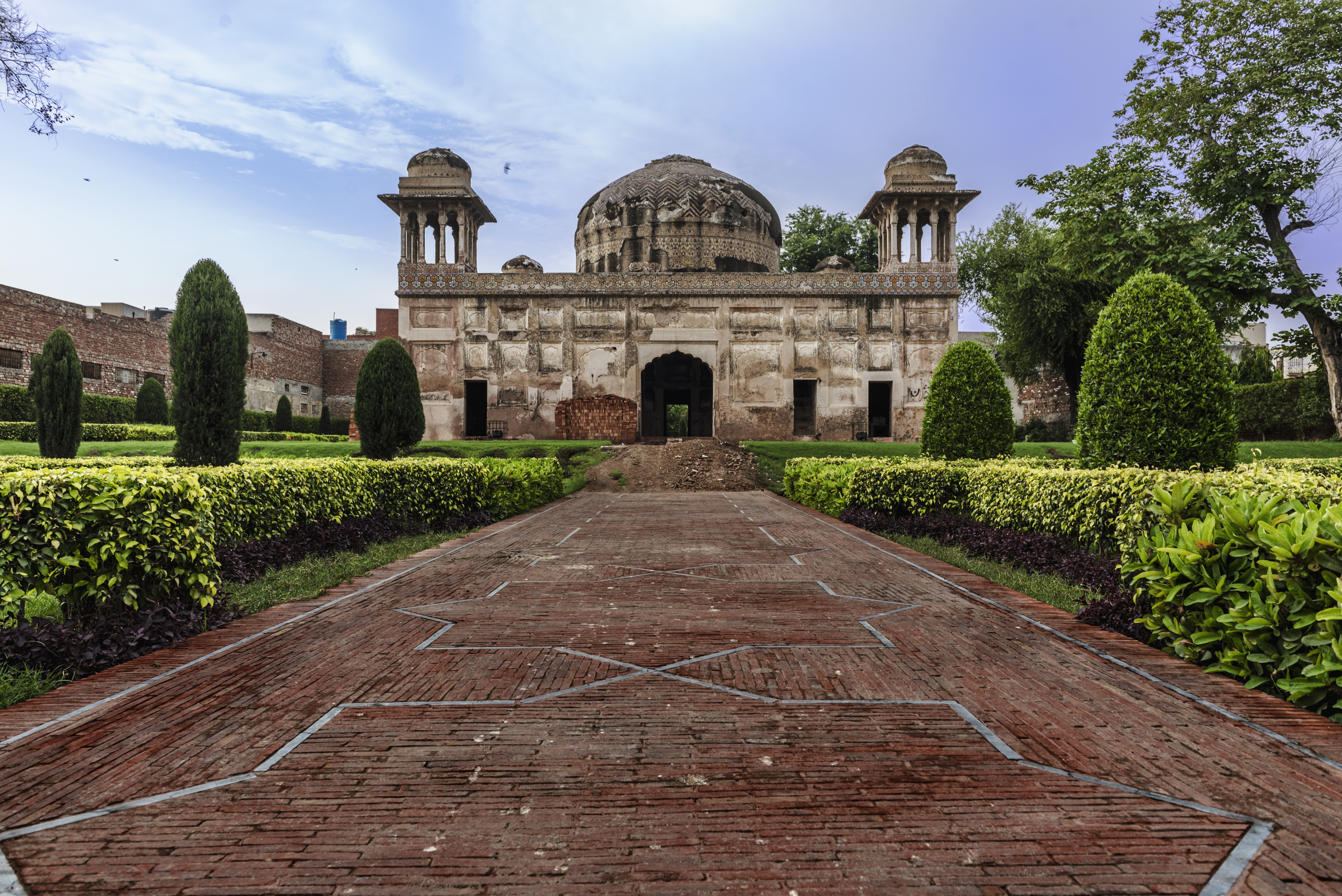
Tomb of Dai Anga

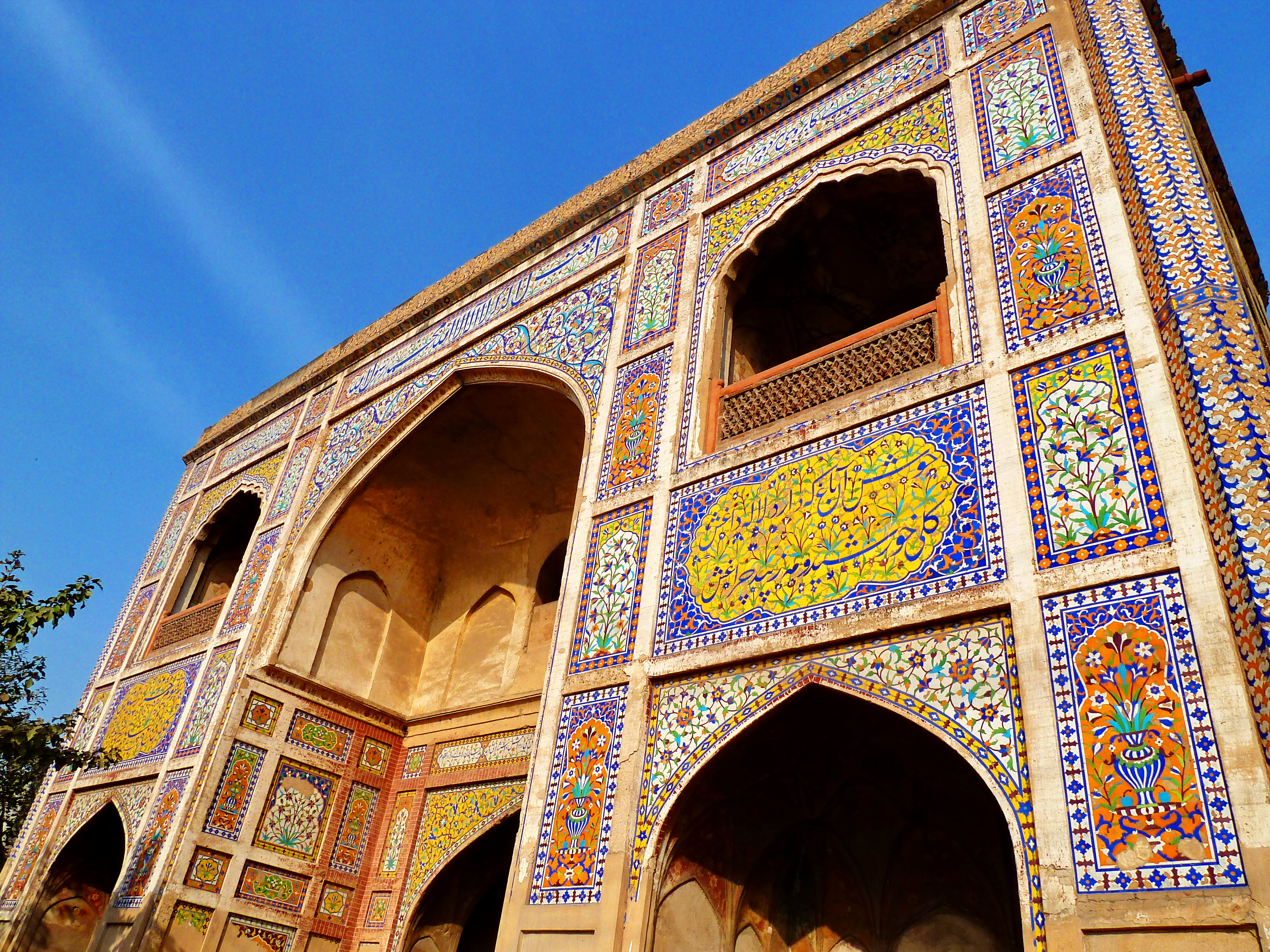
Tomb of Dai Anga entrance

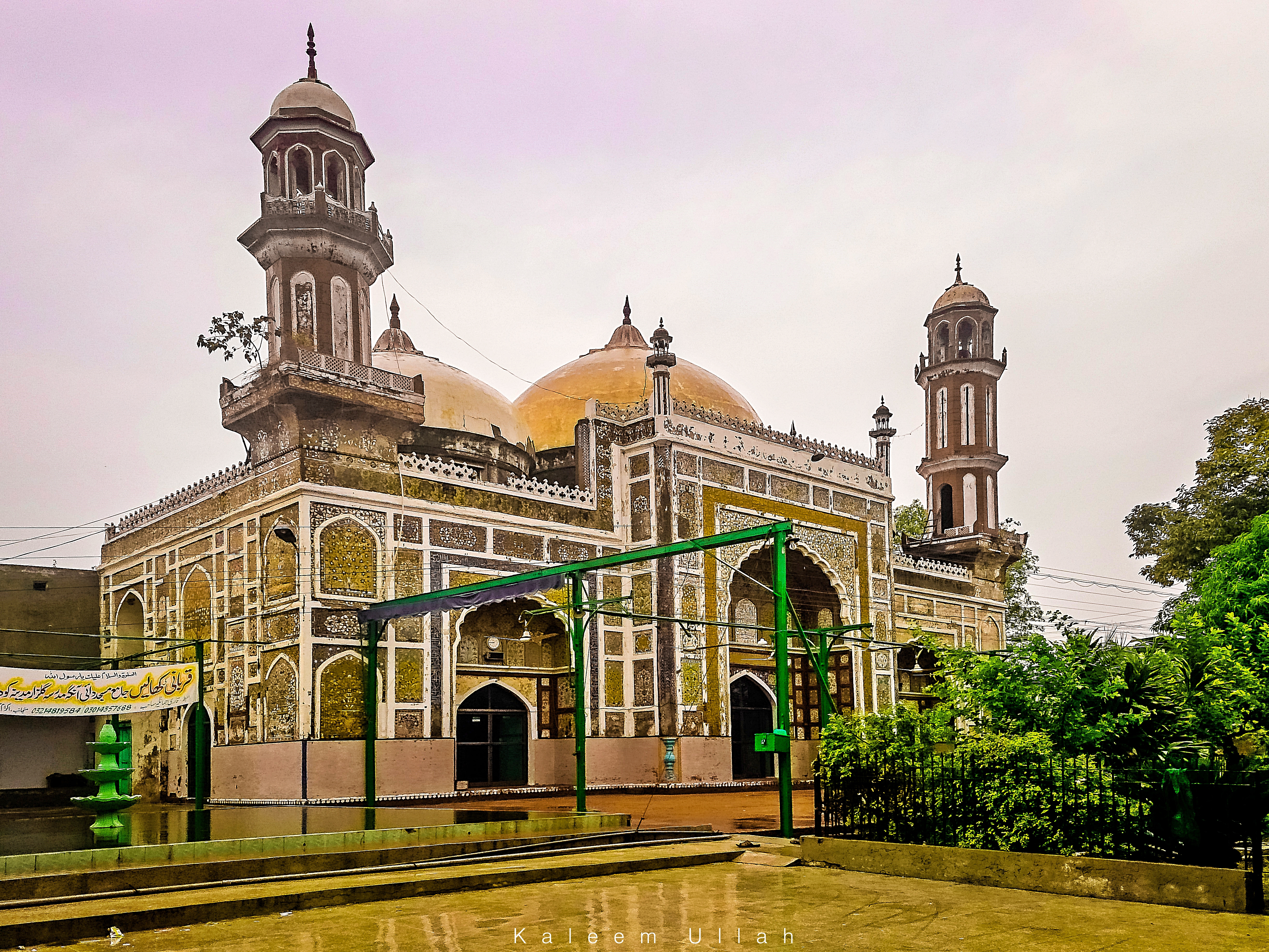
Dai Anga Mosque

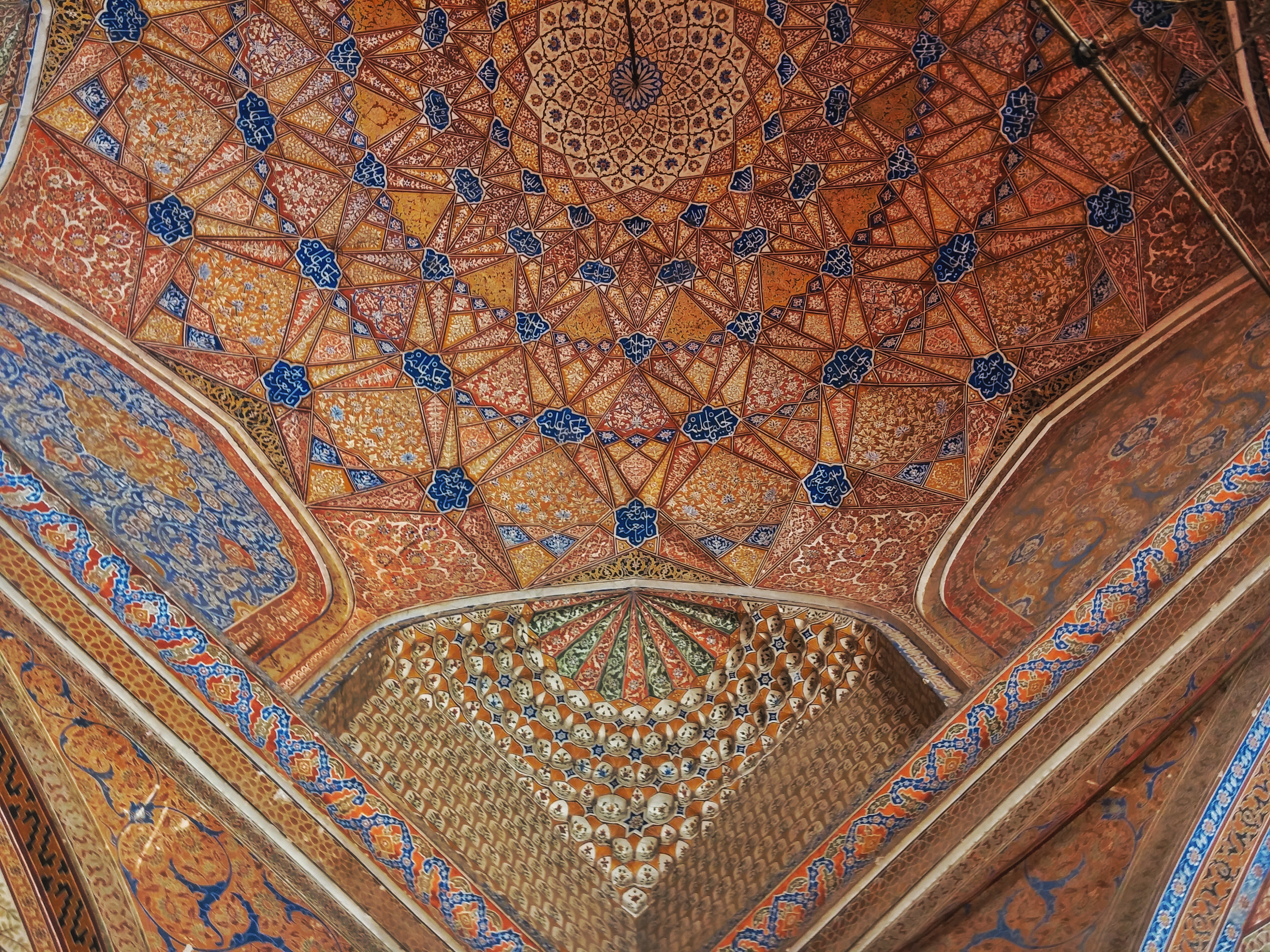
Intricate roof work of Begum Shahi Mosque

== Sikh architecture ==
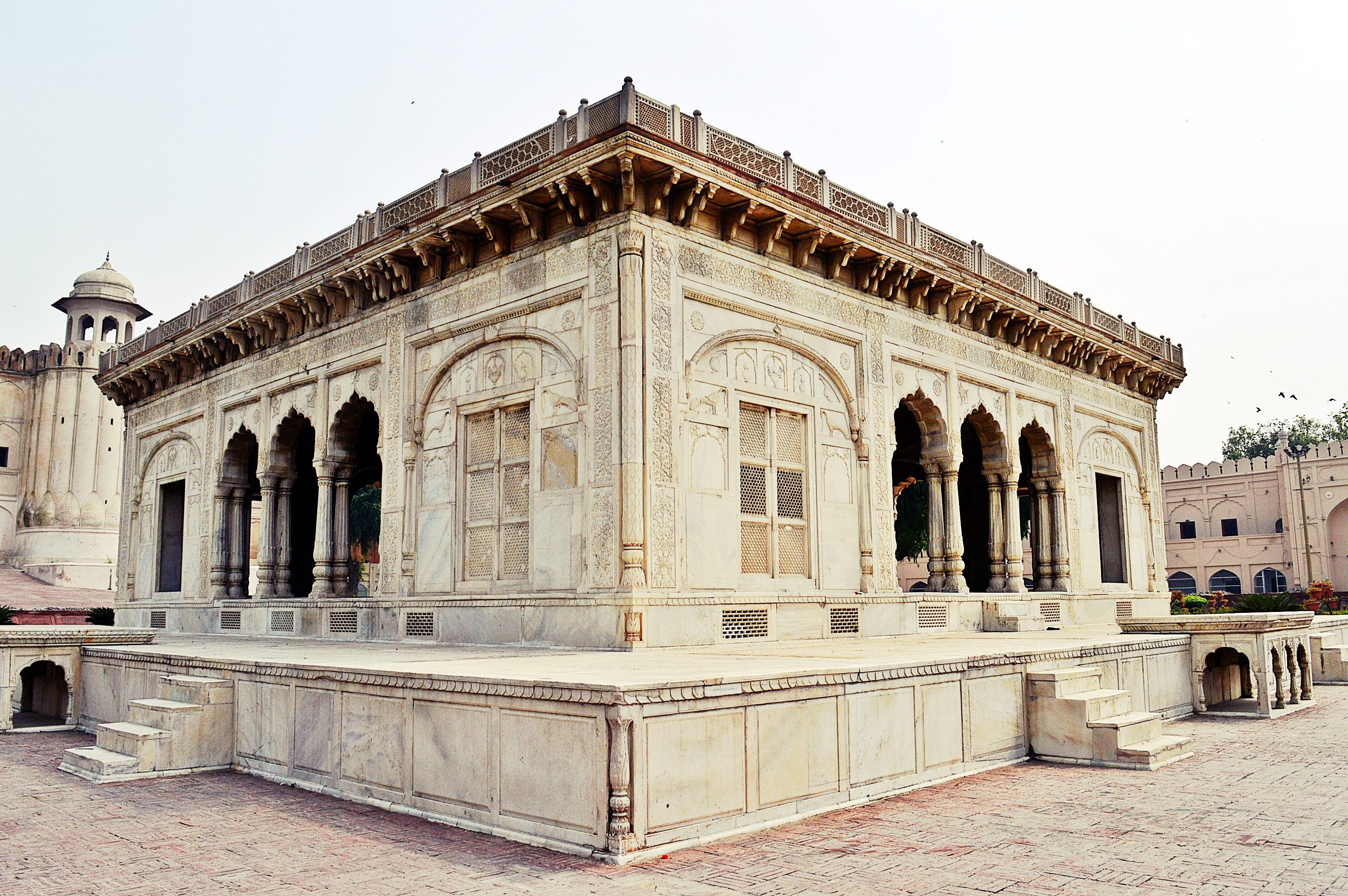
The Hazuri Bagh Baradari built by Ranjit Singh.

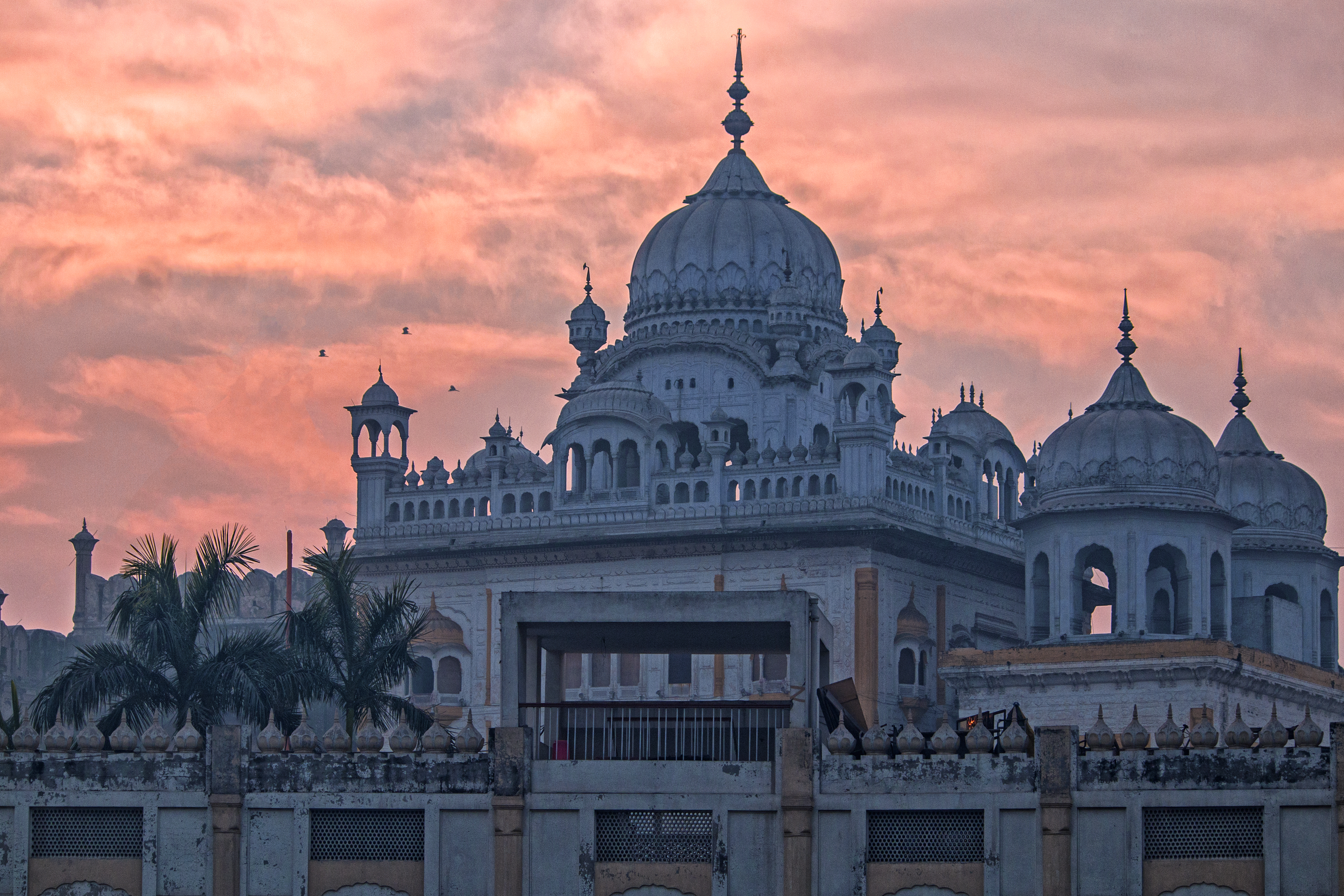
The Samadhi of Ranjit Singh.

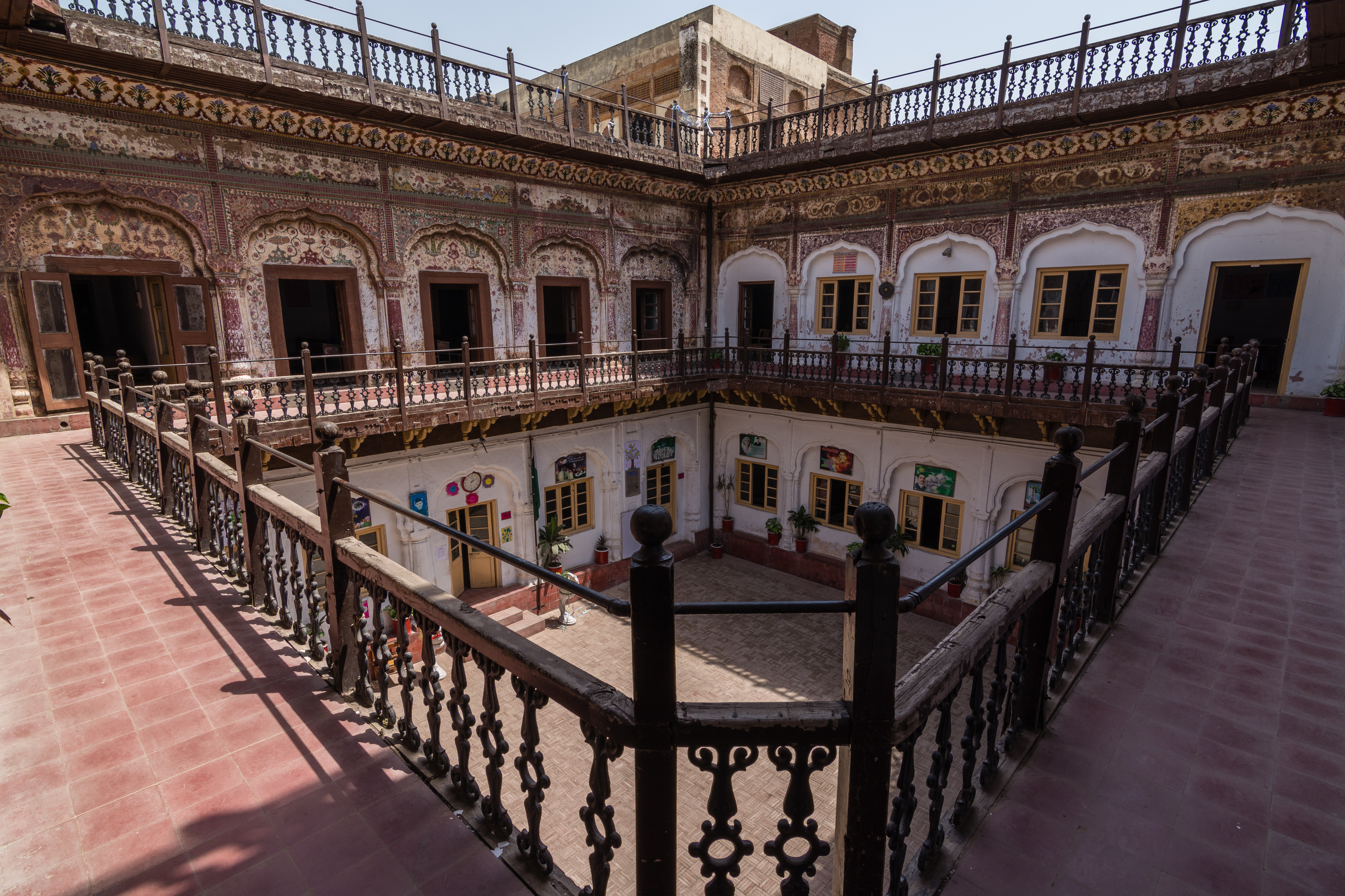
The former haveli of Nau Nihal Singh, the grandson of Maharaja Ranjit Singh of Punjab, Lahore

The Samadhi of Ranjit Singh is the mausoleum of the Sikh ruler Maharaja Ranjit Singh. It is located near the Lahore Fort and Badshahi Mosque in Lahore, Pakistan. Construction was started by his son, Kharak Singh on the spot where he was cremated, and was completed by his youngest son, Duleep Singh in 1848. The tomb exemplifies Sikh architecture, it is gilded fluted domes and cupolas and an ornate balustrade round the top. Ranjit Singh's ashes are contained in a marble urn in the shape of a lotus, sheltered under a marble pavilion inlaid with pietra dura, in the centre of the tomb. Two small monuments to the west of the main mausoleum commemorate Ranjit Singh's son Kharak Singh and grandson Nau Nihal Singh, and their wives. The religious structure is the gurdwara, a place where the Guru dwells. A gurdwara is not only the all-important building of the Faith, as masjid or mosque of the Islamic faith and mandir or temple of the Hindu religion, but it is also, like its Islamic and Hindu counterparts, the keynote of Sikh architecture.

== British architecture ==
Under British rule (1849–1947), colonial architecture in Lahore combined Mughal, Gothic and Victorian styles. Under British rule, Sir Ganga Ram designed and built the General Post Office, Lahore Museum, Aitchison College, Mayo School of Arts (now the NCA), Ganga Ram Hospital, Lady Mclagan Girls High School, the Chemistry department of the Government College University, the Albert Victor wing of Mayo Hospital, Sir Ganga Ram High School (now Lahore College for Women) the Hailey College of Commerce, Ravi Road House for the Disabled, the Ganga Ram Trust Building on Shahrah-e-Quaid-e-Azam, and the Lady Maynard Industrial School. He also constructed Model Town, a suburb that has recently developed into a cultural center for Lahore's growing socioeconomic elite.

The General Post Office and YMCA buildings in Lahore commemorated the golden jubilee of Queen Victoria, an event marked by the construction of clock towers and monuments all over British India. Other important British buildings included the High Court, the Government College University, the museums, St. Anthony's College, the National College of Arts, Montgomery Hall, Tollinton Market, the University of the Punjab (Old Campus) and the Provincial Assembly. Even today, Mall Road retains a variety of Gothic and Victorian style buildings built during the British Raj. At one end of The Mall stands the university, one of the most prestigious universities of Pakistan. The British also launched the city's first horse-racing club in 1924, starting a tradition that continues today at the Lahore Race Club. Other renowned buildings are Punjab Assembly Hall, Lahore High Court, General Post Office (GPO), Lahore Museum, Punjab University, Tollinton Market and the Lahore Railway Station.

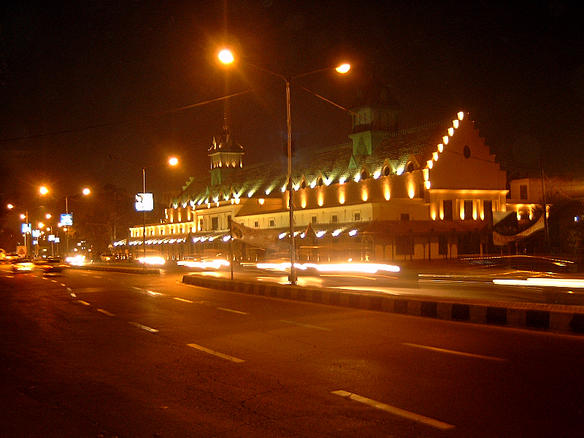
Tollinton Market

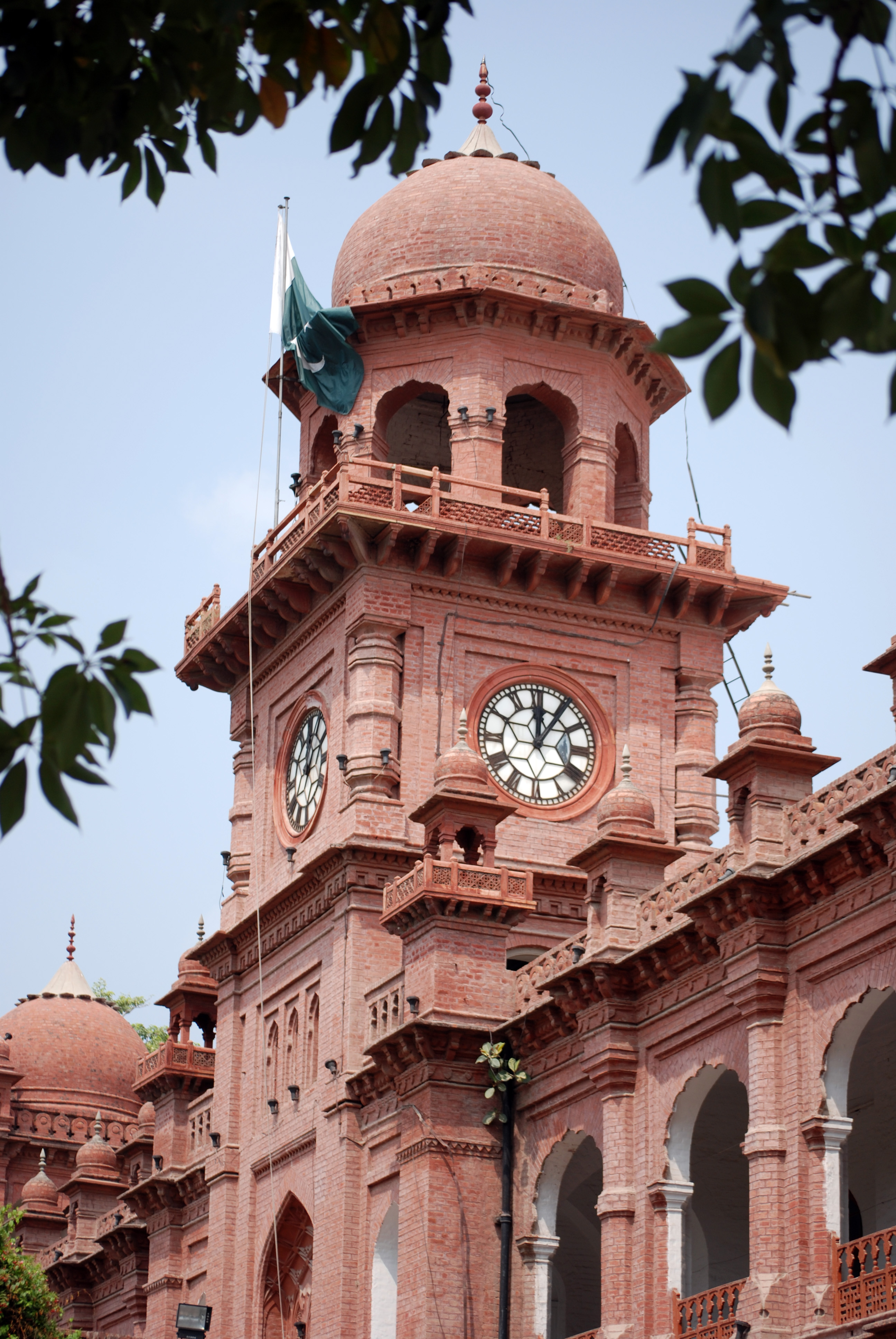
Allama Iqbal Campus in University of the Punjab

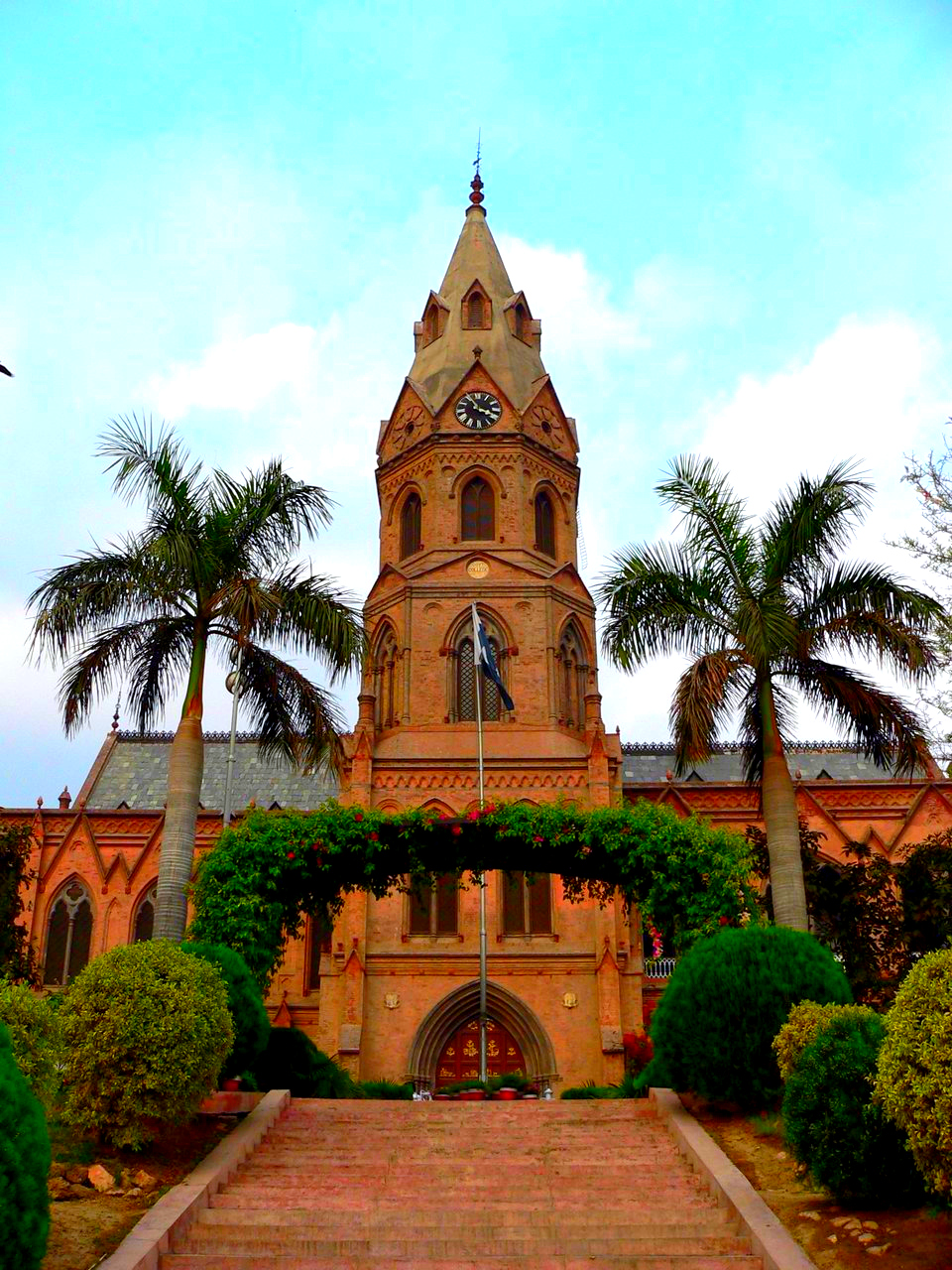
Government College University

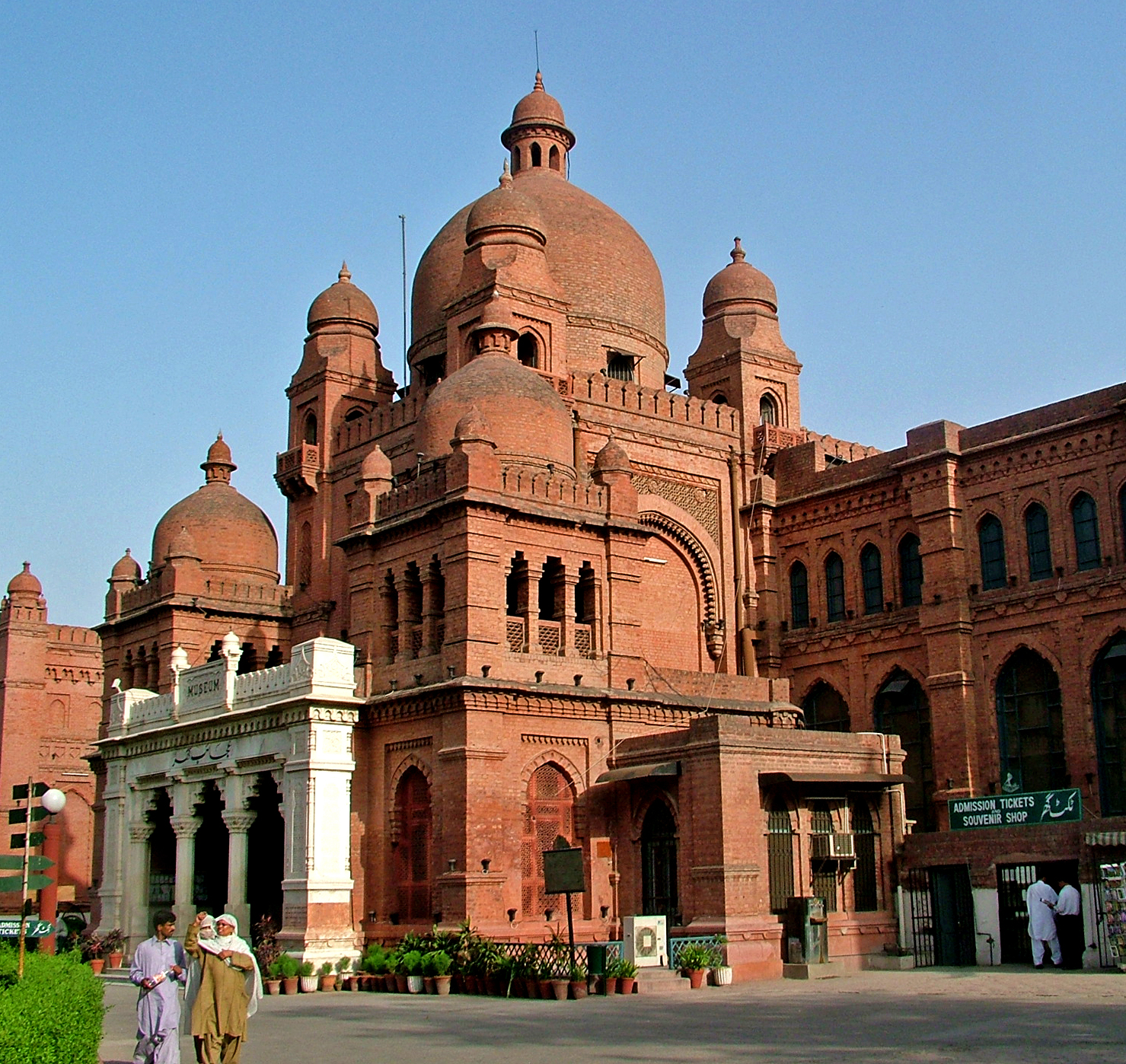
Lahore Museum

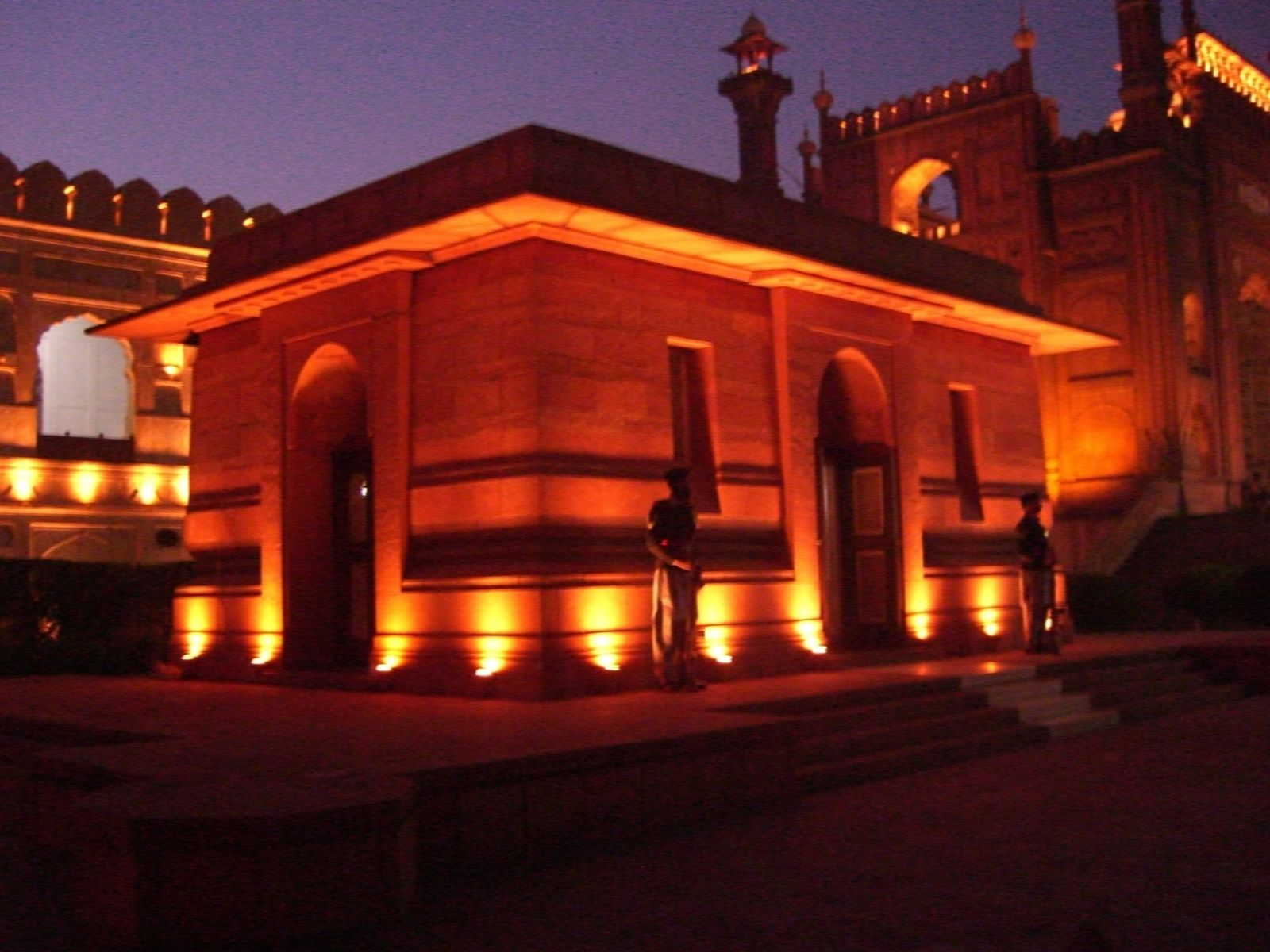
Tomb of Allama Iqbal (built during British Raj)

== Popular forms of architecture ==
=== Mosques ===
Religion throughout history has influenced the fabric of Muslim society and we find its imprint on art and culture as well. The city of Lahore which has been the seat of learning could not escape the impact of Islam. This impact we find in several architectural monuments specifically the Mosques built during the supremacy of Muslims over this area. Some of these Mosques were built by women and courtiers for the purpose of spreading knowledge. The most famous Mosque built during the Moghul period has been the Badshahi Mosque. Others include the Masjid Sara-I-Shahjahani, built by Emperor Shah Jahan and situated next to Emperor Jahangir's tomb; Taxali Gate Mosque; Mosque of Mullah Mohammad Saleh Kamboh, situated near the Mochi Gate; Sunehri Mosque, built during the last phase of Mughal rule; Masjid Sardar Jahan, the earliest mosque of Jahangir's period and situated inside the Lahori Gate; and the Zenana Masjid in the Fort built near the Ladies Quadrangle and was meant exclusively for the ladies living nearby.

=== Gardens ===
Since the beginning Lahore has been famous for its beautiful gardens and parks. Its ideal location on the banks of the Ravi provided an opportunity to the rulers and lovers of beauty to plan gardens to satisfy their aesthetic taste. During the Moghul period, most of the gardens were planned around mausoleums of rulers or saints or were laid by the royal courtiers. The gardens in some cases were used as farm houses or summer resorts. Many Emperors would camp in these gardens while on their visit to Lahore or when they were in transit. We are not certain whether these gardens were also used by the public at that time or not. Some of the gardens laid down during the Mughal period include-the Dilkusha garden, the Shalimar Gardens, the Chaubujri Garden, the Hazuri Bagh and the Gulabi Garden.

=== Tombs ===
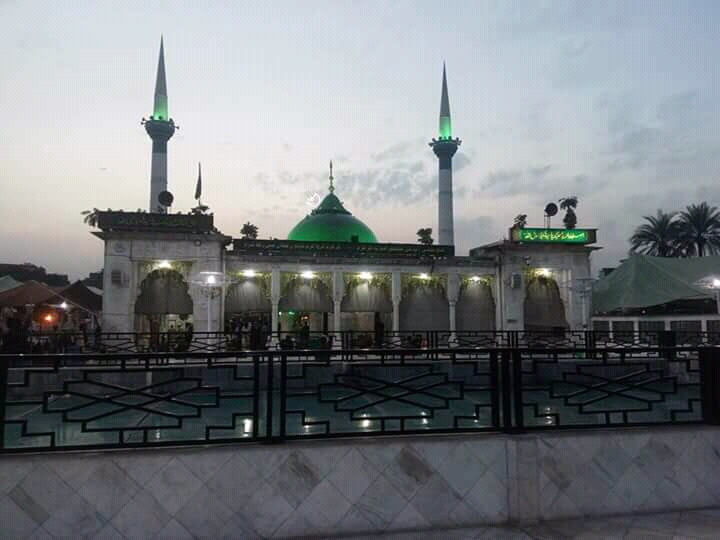
Shrine of Data Durbar.

Lahore is the city where mortal remains of the most romantic and artistic of all the Emperors of this sub continent exist. It is the city where one of the Mughal queens, Nur Jahan lies in eternal sleep in a city which she loved the most. Here too lies the figure believed to bring romance into lives, Anarkali. Besides royalty there are a number of important people who have left an imprint on the pages of history and are now a proud heritage of Lahore. Among the administrators we can name Asaf Khan, brother of Nur Jahan, and also a famous architect of his times, Ali Mardan Khan. Lahore is equally proud of religious leaders and saints. Their tombs are daily visited by thousands of their disciples and the living influence of their teachings is still being felt today.

== Modern architecture ==
In modern Lahore, the traditions of architecture in Lahore have been changing. The dome, minaret, the arch, the intricate mirror work and the extravagant use of ornaments which were features of the Mughal style, have now gone out of fashion. Furthermore, the changing patterns of economy, industrialisation and increase in population have contributed a great deal in revolutionising the entire basis of architectural forms. Due to changing lifestyles and trends, there has been an ever-increasing tendency to adopt Western and American forms of architecture. However, there is no parallel between the classical Mughal architecture and that of modern structures. Mughal architecture by far surpasses contemporary architectural designs. In modern days, parts of Bahria Town Housing Scheme in Lahore are themed on ancient Egyptian culture. There are many other architectural notables, including themes for different locales that make Bahria a very interesting and well conceived scheme to visit and live in. Lahore Alhamra Arts Council is also a piece of Architecture in Lahore, it gives modern and old all traditions of Pakistan. It is the work of Aga Khan in Lahore.

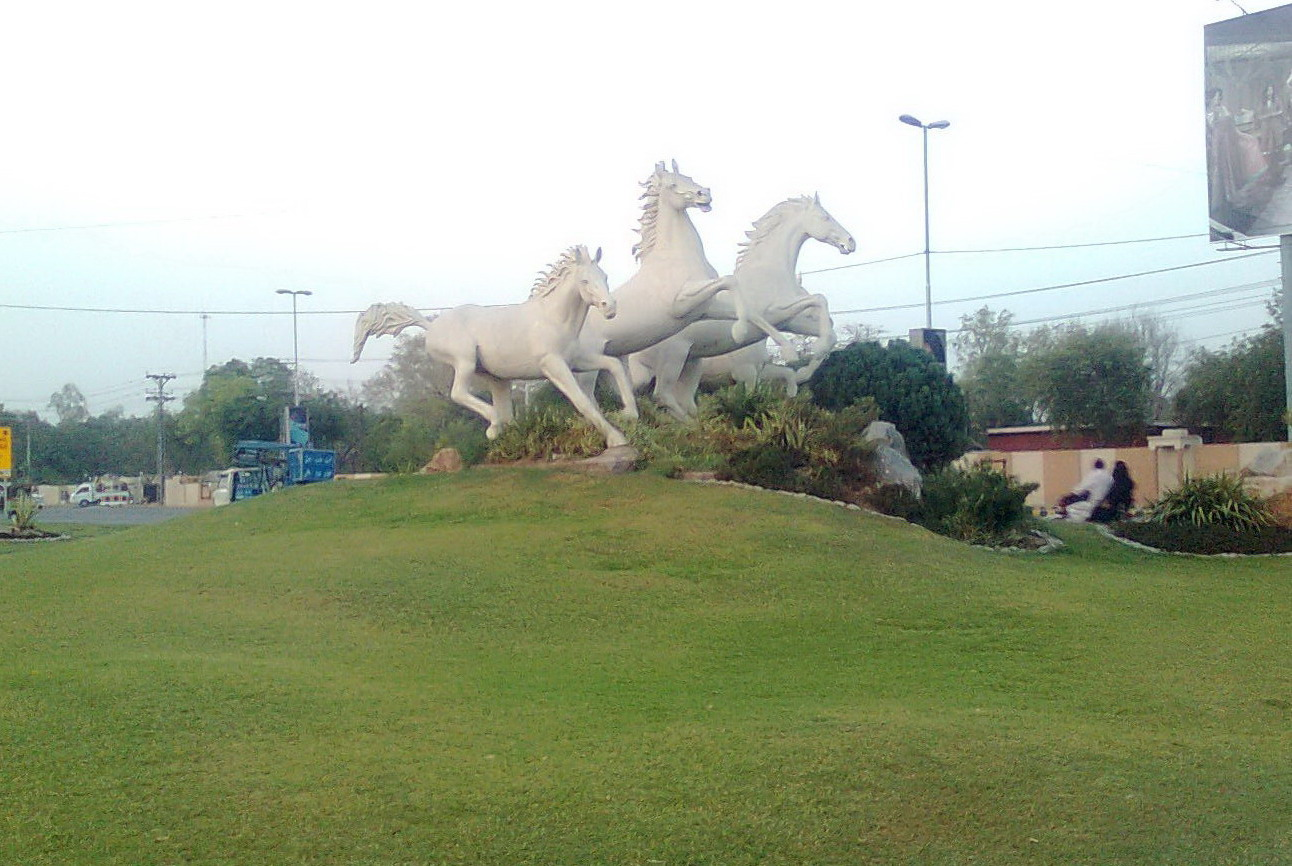
Ghora Chowk (Horse Roundabout) in Lahore Cantt

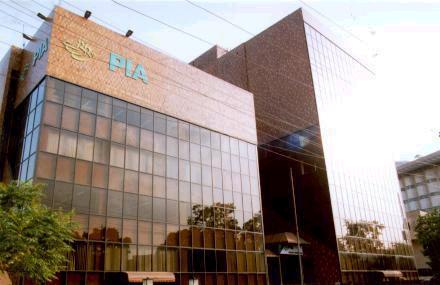
PIA Head Office

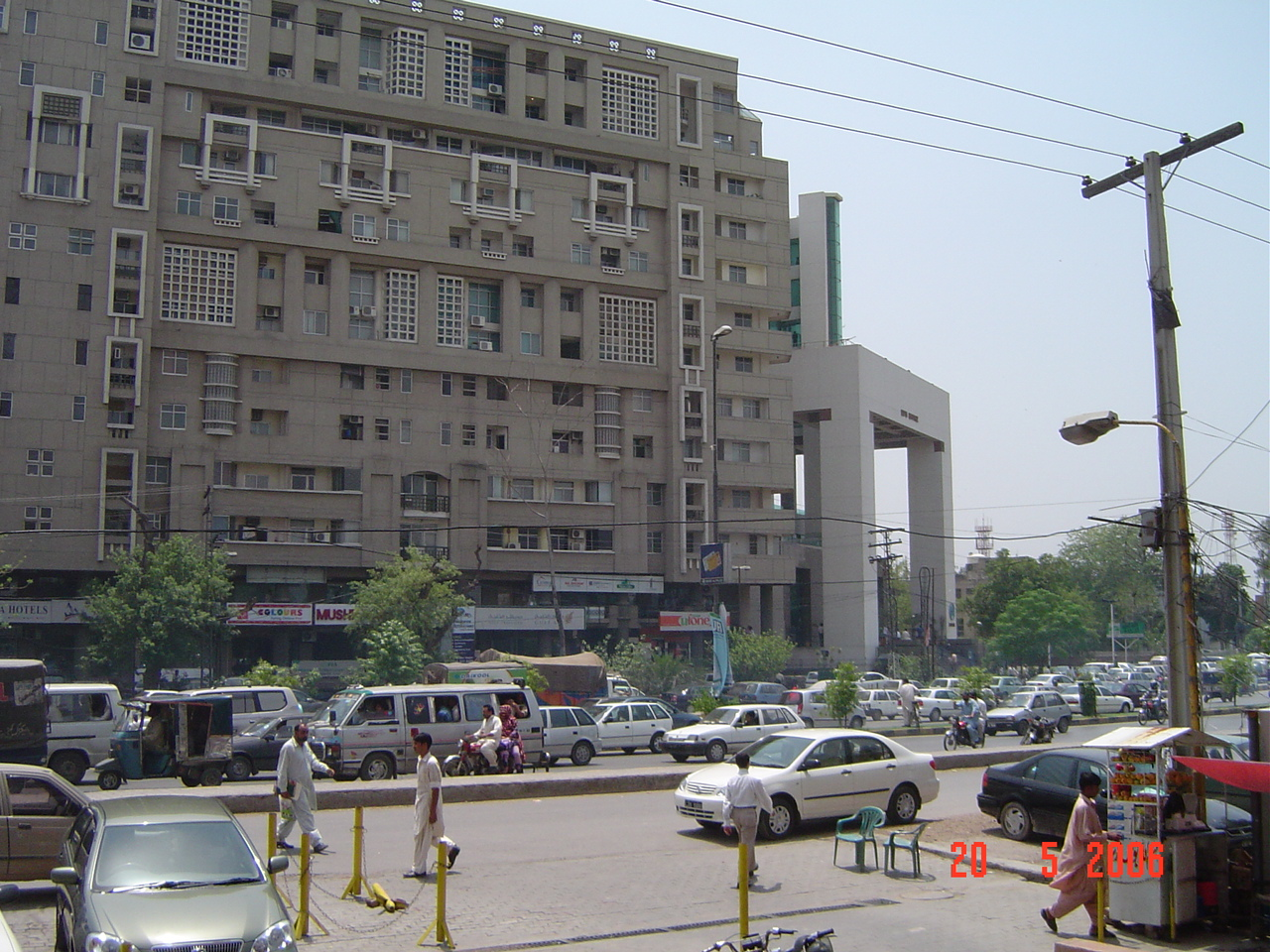
Eden Heights

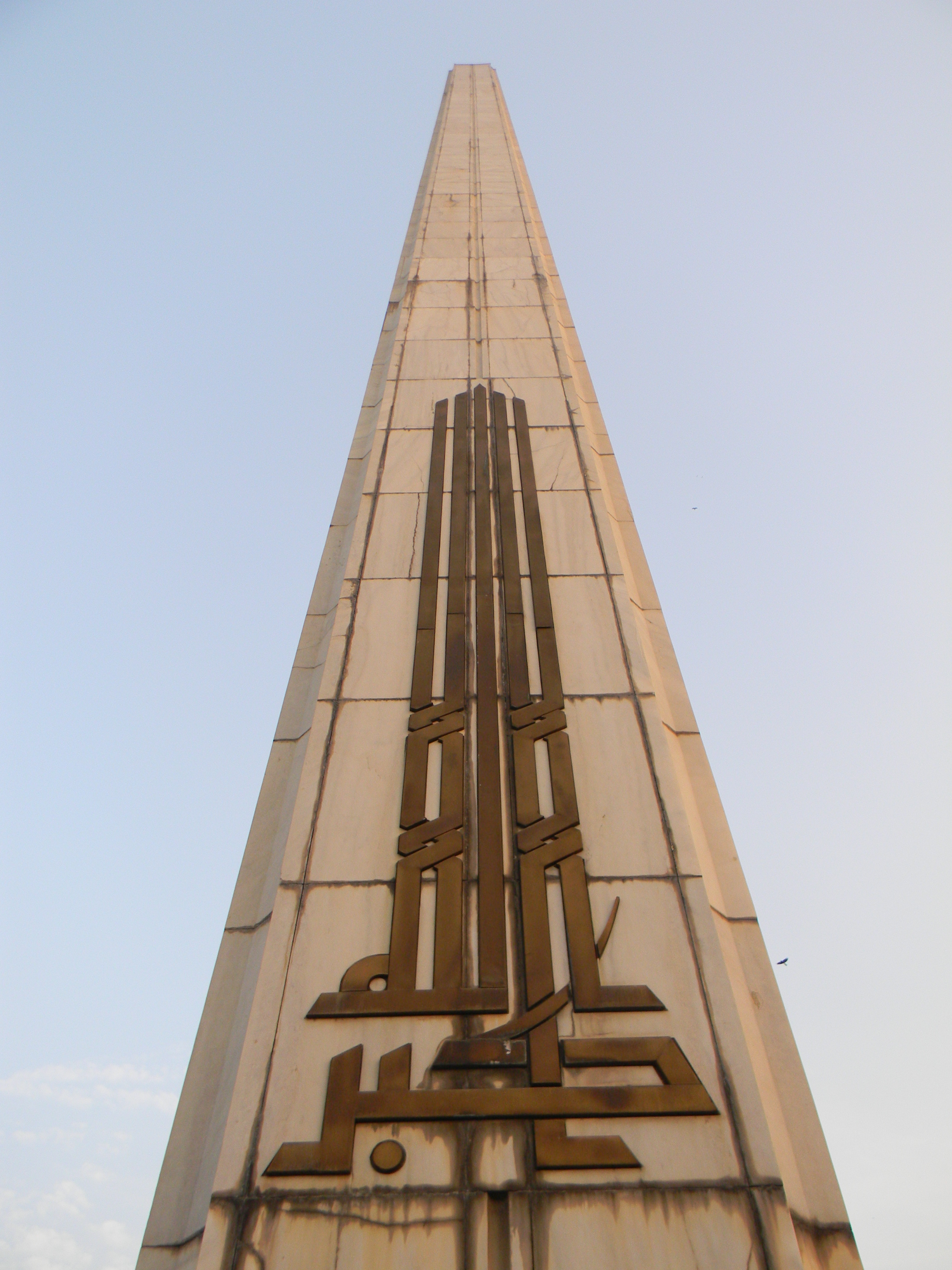
Islamic Summit

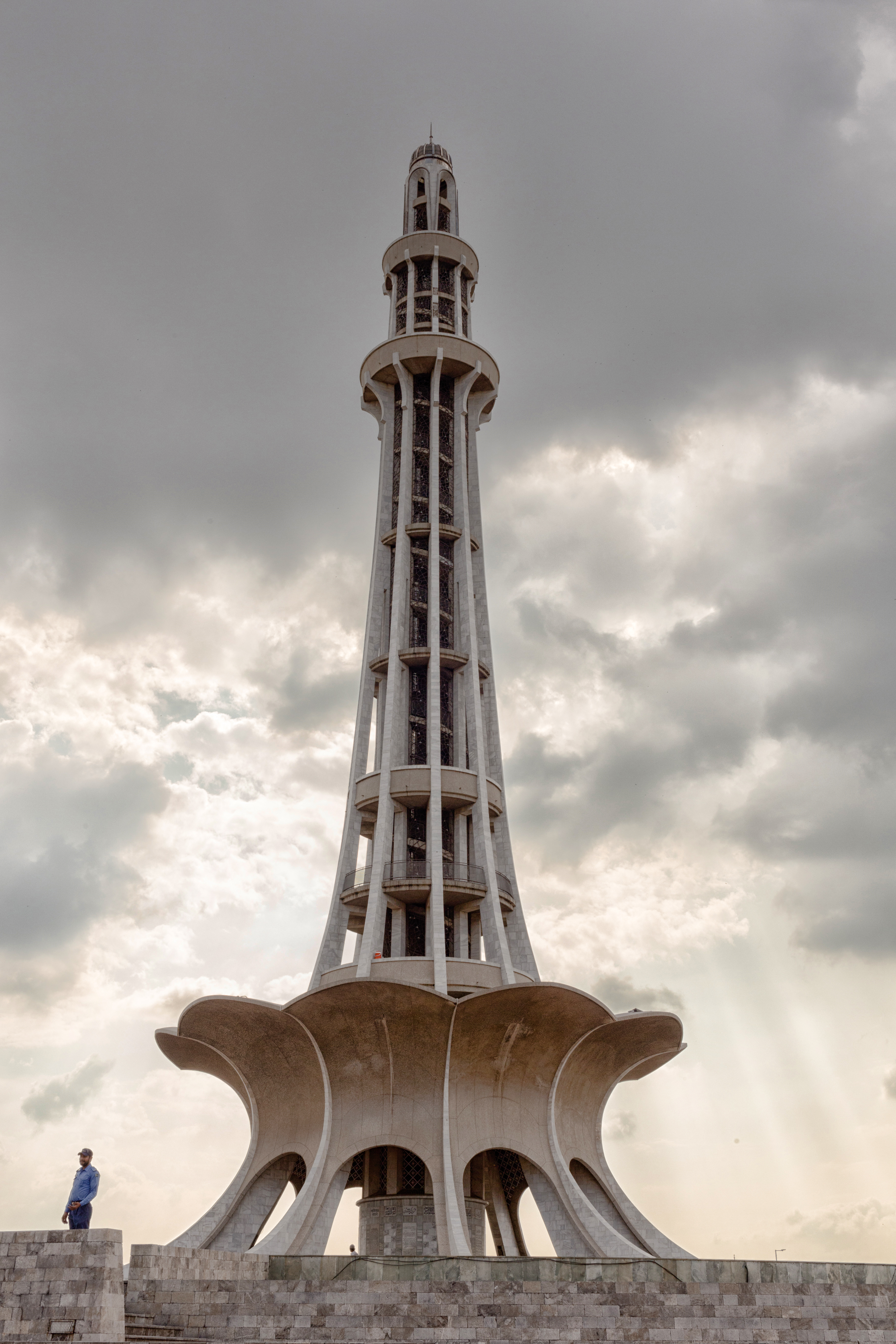
Minar-e-Pakistan

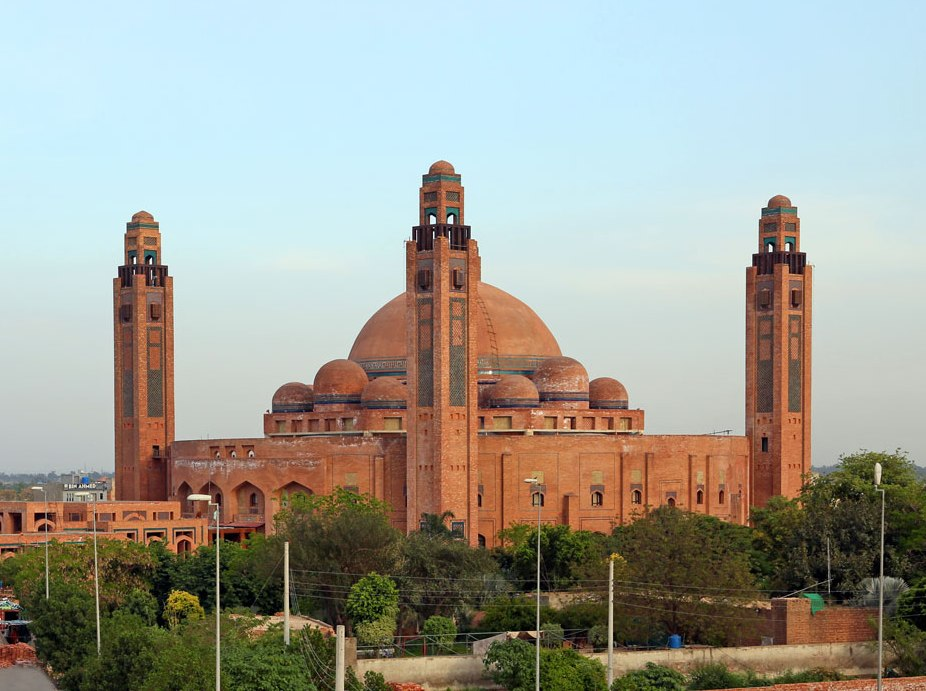
Grand Jamia Mosque, Bahria Town Lahore

== See also ==
- Mughal Era in Lahore
- Walled City of Lahore
- Indo-Persian culture
- Pakistani architecture
- In Lahore:
  - Alhamra Arts Council
  - Hazuri Bagh Baradari
  - Lahore Fort
  - Lahore Railway Station
  - Minar-e-Pakistan
  - Samadhi of Ranjit Singh
