= Wazir Khan Mosque =

Mosque in Lahore, Pakistan

- وزیر خاں مسیت مسجد وزیر خان
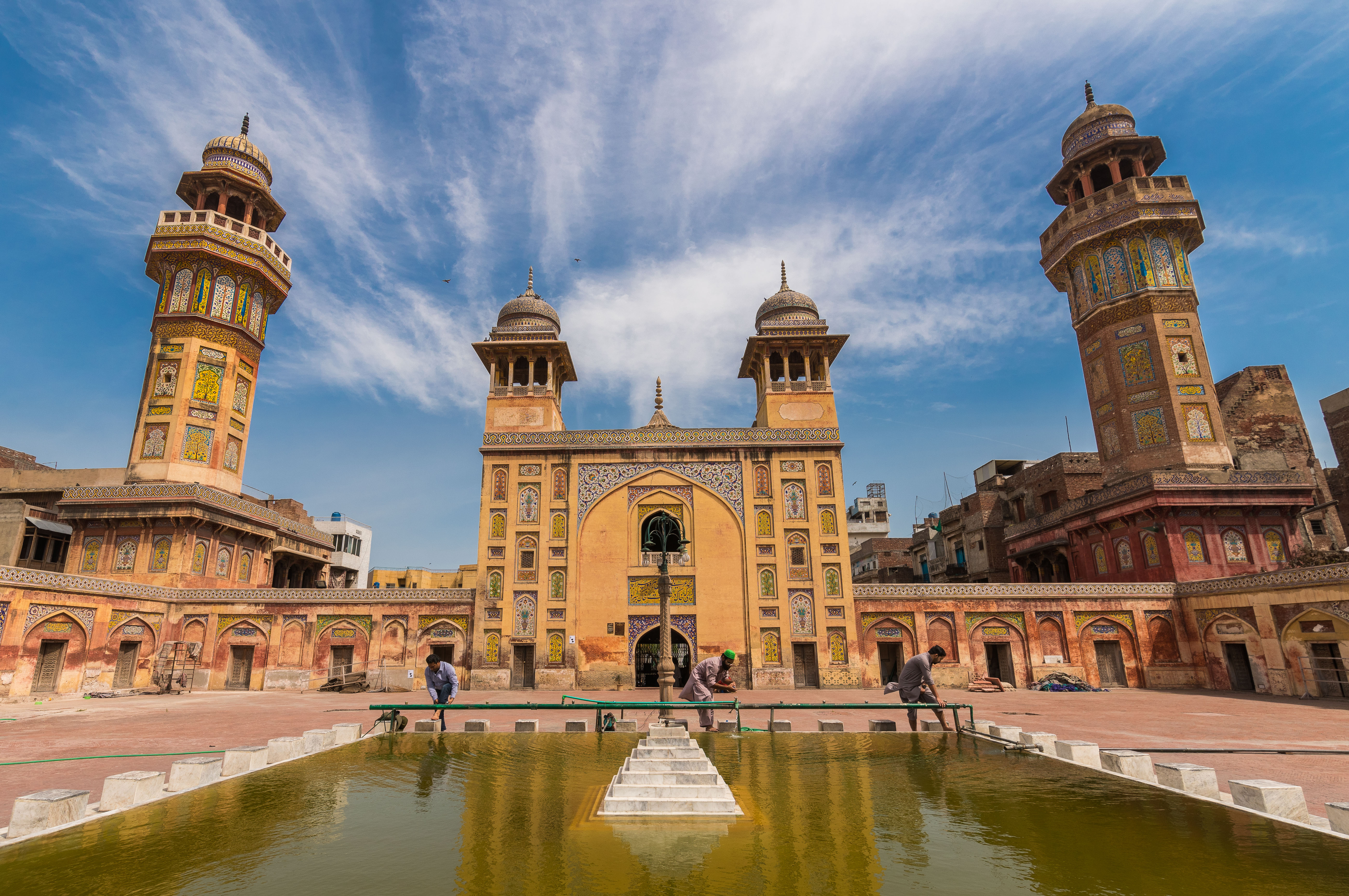

Religion
- Affiliation: Islam

Location
- Location: Lahore, Punjab, Pakistan
- Interactive map of Wazir Khan Mosque
- Coordinates: 31°34′59″N 74°19′24″E

Architecture
- Architect: Unknown
- Type: mosque and Sufi mausoleum
- Style: Indo-Islamic, Mughal
- Founder: Wazir Khan
- Groundbreaking: 1634
- Completed: 3 December 1641; 384 years ago

Specifications
- Dome: 5
- Dome height (outer): 21 feet (6.4 m)
- Dome height (inner): 32 feet (9.8 m)
- Dome dia. (outer): 19 feet (5.8 m)
- Dome dia. (inner): 23 feet (7.0 m)
- Minaret: 4
- Minaret height: 107 feet (33 m)

The Wazir Khan Mosque (Note: Punjabi: وزیر خاں مسیت, romanized: Wazīr Khã Masīt; Persian, Urdu: مسجد وزیر خان, romanized: Masjid Wazīr Khān) is a 17th-century Mughal mosque located in the city of Lahore, Punjab, Pakistan. The mosque was commissioned by the then governor of Lahore, Wazir Khan, during the reign of the Mughal emperor Shah Jahan as a part of an ensemble of buildings that also included the nearby Wazir Khan Hammam baths. Construction of the mosque began in 1634, and was completed in 1641.

Considered to be the most ornately decorated Mughal-era mosque, Wazir Khan Mosque is noted for its intricate faience tile-work known as kashi-kari, as well as its interior surfaces that are almost entirely embellished with elaborate frescoes. It is on the UNESCO World Heritage Tentative List.

== Location ==
The mosque is located in the Walled City of Lahore along the southern side of Lahore's Shahi Guzargah, or "Royal Road," which was the traditional route traversed by Mughal nobles on their way to royal residences at the Lahore Fort. The mosque is situated approximately 260 meters west of the Delhi Gate, where the Shahi Hammam is located. The Masjid also faces a town square known as Wazir Khan Chowk, and the Chitta Gate. The mosque hosts the shrine of Saint Sakhi Saif Souf.

== Background ==
The mosque was commissioned by the royal physician and the subahdar, or Viceroy, of Punjab, Hakim Ilam-ud-din Ansari, better known by his royal title of Wazir Khan. Wazir Khan owned substantial property near the Delhi Gate, and commissioned the Wazir Khan mosque in 1634 in order to enclose the tomb of Miran Badshah, an esteemed Sufi saint whose tomb now lies in the courtyard of the mosque. Prior to the construction of the Wazir Khan Mosque, the site had been occupied by an older shrine to the saint. Wazir Khan's mosque superseded the older Maryam Zamani Mosque as Lahore's main mosque for congregational Friday prayers.

The main construction of the mosque began during the reign of Shah Jahan in either 1634 or 1635, and was completed in approximately seven years. The chief architect of the Wazir Khan Mosque remains unknown, although Wazir Khan is documented to have employed artisans and craftsmen from his hometown of Chiniot, which was renowned for wood carving and stonework, to construct the mosque. During this period Ali Mardan Khan, Ahmad Lahori, Ala-ul-Mulk Tuni and Abdul Karim were the prominent architects active in Lahore, however, due to absence of any inscriptions on mosque connecting any of them with its construction, the identity of its architect remains uncertain.

In the late 1880s, John Lockwood Kipling, father of Rudyard Kipling, wrote about the mosque and its decorative elements in the former Journal of Indian Art. The British scholar Fred Henry Andrews noted in 1903 that the mosque had fallen into disrepair.

== Architecture ==
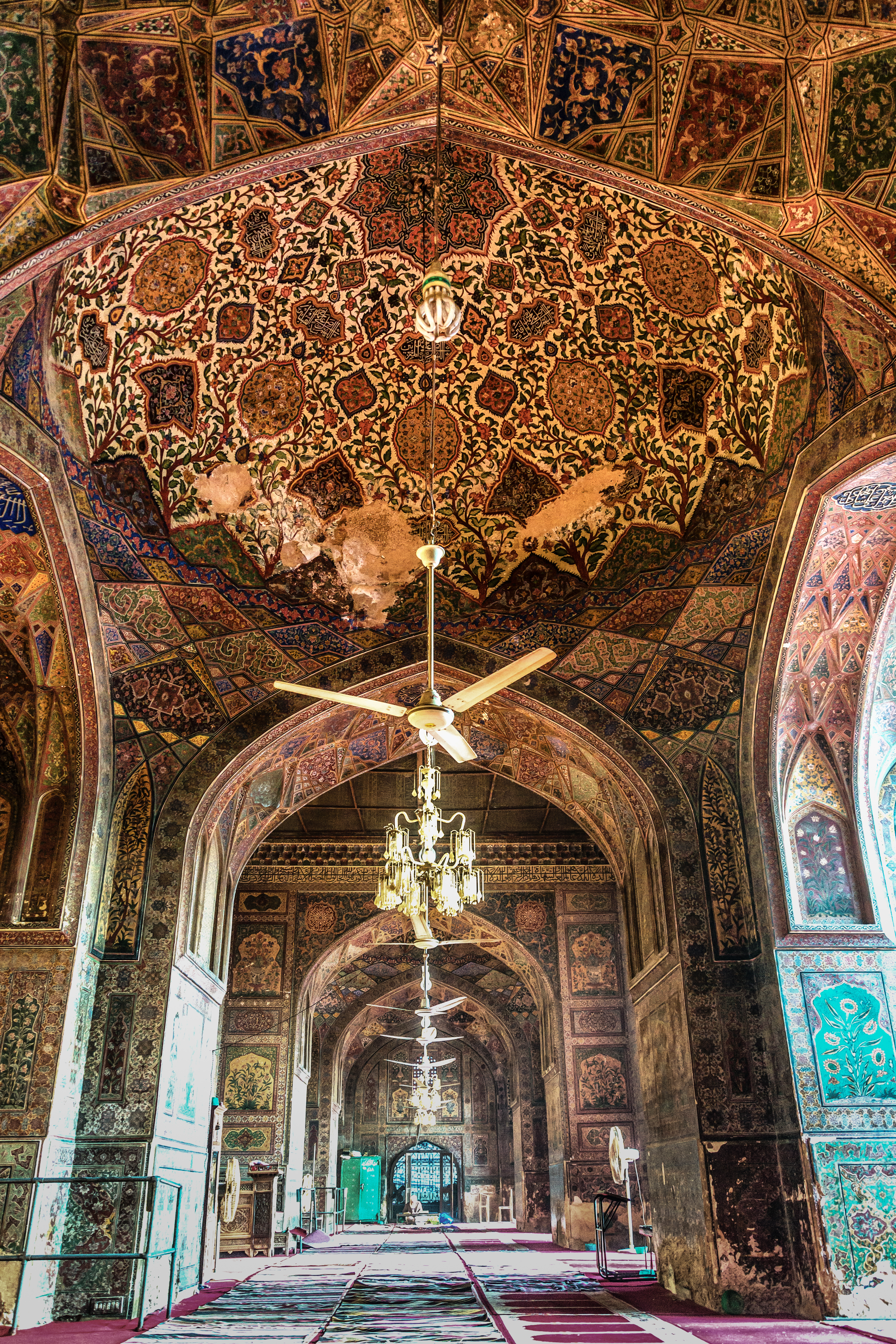
Wazir Khan Mosque is renowned for its intricate and extensive embellishment.

The mosque is built on an elevated plinth, with the main portal opening onto the Wazir Khan Chowk. The outer perimeter of the Wazir Khan Mosque measures 279 feet (85 m) by 159 feet (48 m), with the long axis parallel to the Shahi Guzargah. It was built with bricks laid in kankar lime. The mosque's interior is embellished with frescoes that synthesize Mughal and local Punjabi decorative traditions, while the exterior of the mosque is decorated with intricate Punjabi tile-mosaic known as kashi-kari.

=== Decorative elements ===
Wazir Khan mosque is known for its elaborate embellishment in a style which draws from the decorative traditions from several regions. While other monuments in Lahore from the Shah Jahan period feature intricate kashi-kari tile work, none match the scale of the Wazir Khan Mosque.

==== Structure ====
Bricks facing the mosque's exterior are richly embellished with the Punjabi-style tile work known as kashi-kari. Persian-style colours used include lajvard (cobalt blue), firozi (cerulean), white, green, orange, yellow and purple.

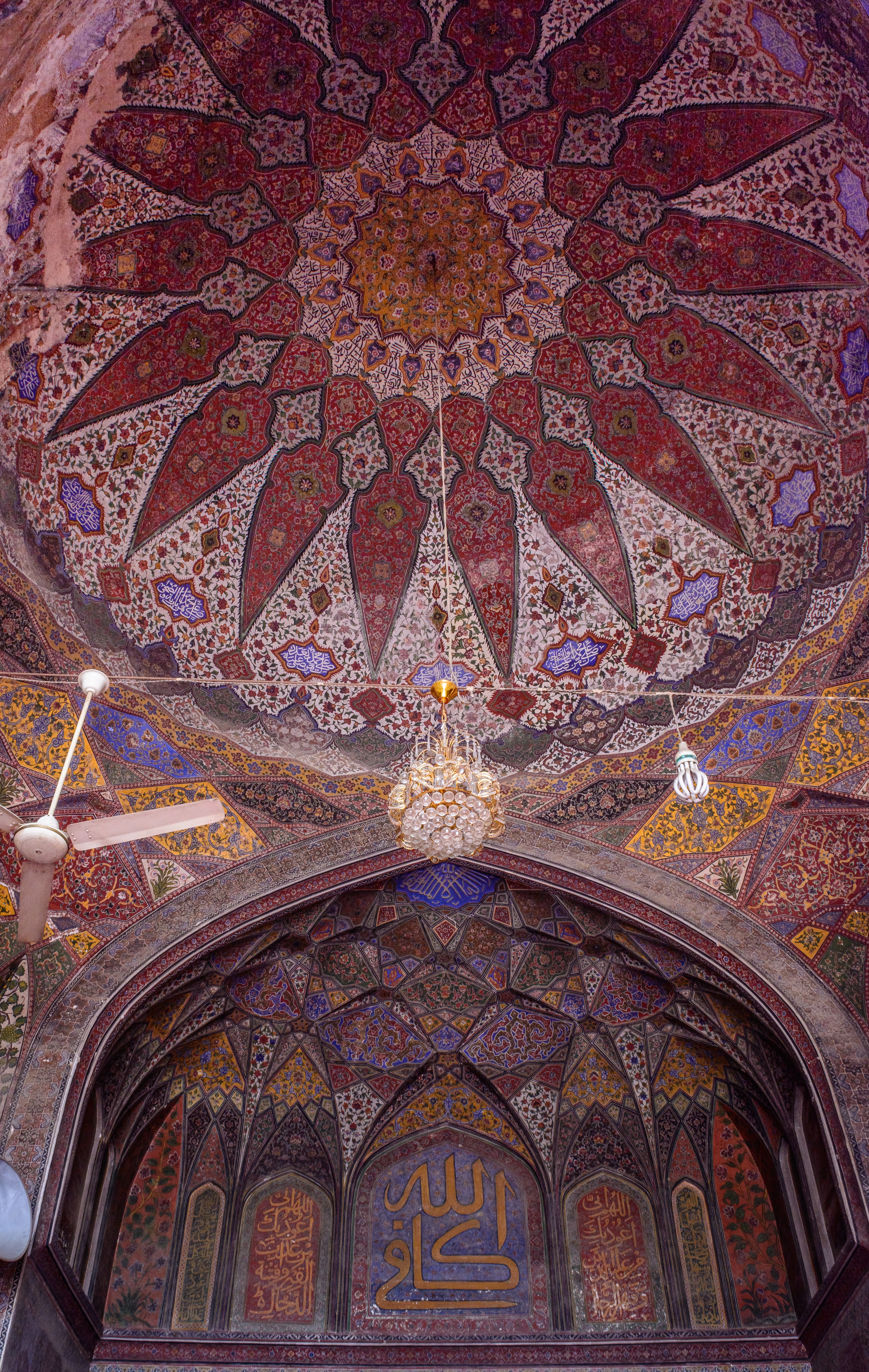
The main prayer hall is richly embellished with Mughal frescoes.

The façade of the entry portal facing Wazir Khan Chowk is decorated with elaborate tile work and calligraphy that includes verses of the Qur'an, the sayings of the Prophet Muhammad, prayers for the Prophet, and calligraphic insignias. Above the iwan entrance to the main prayer hall are verses from the Quran's surah al-Baqara written by the calligraphist Haji Yousaf Kashmiri.

==== Frescoes ====
Unlike the contemporary Shah Jahan Mosque in Sindh, the interior walls of Wazir Khan Mosque are plastered and adorned with highly detailed buon frescoes. The interior decorative style is unique for Mughal-era mosques, as it combines imperial Mughal elements with local Punjabi decorative styles. The main prayer hall contains a square pavilion over which the mosque's largest dome rests — a Persian form known as Char Taq. The underside of the dome feature frescoes depicting trees in pairs, pitchers of wine, and platters of fruit, which are an allusion to the Islamic concept of Paradise.

==== Architectural embellishments ====
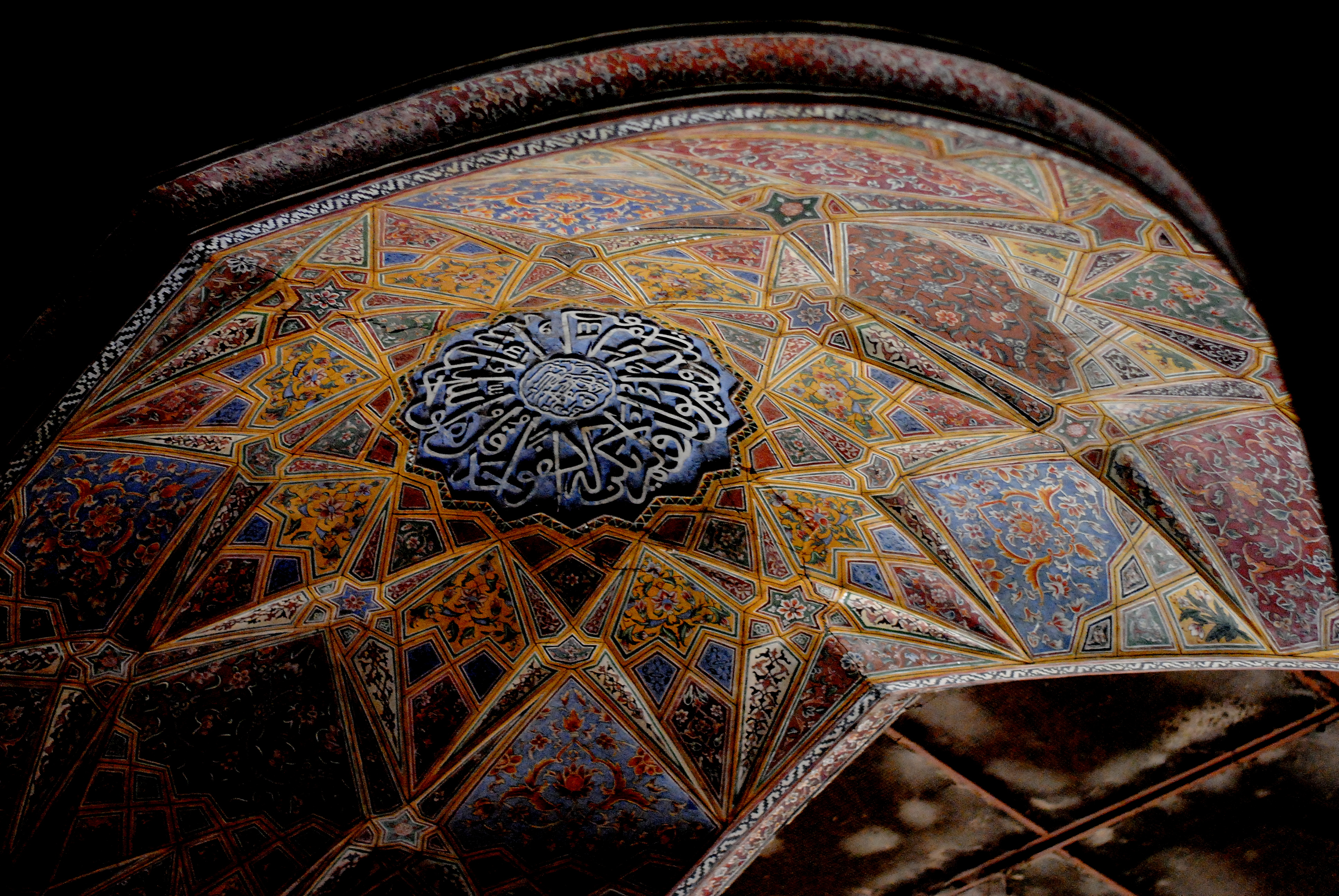
Several archways in the mosque are decorated with muqarnas.

The arched niche at the mosque's entrance facing Wazir Khan Chowk is richly decorated with floral motifs, and features one of Lahore's first examples of a muqarna — an architectural element found at the Alhambra in Spain, as well as on several imperial mosques in Iran. The low domes over the prayer hall reflect the style of the earlier Lodi dynasty, which ruled Lahore prior to the Mughal era.

== Layout ==
Wazir Khan's mosque was part of a larger complex that included a row of shops traditionally reserved for calligraphers and bookbinders, and the town square in front of the mosque's main entrance. The mosque also rented space to other types of merchants in the mosque's northern and eastern façades, and ran the nearby Shahi Hammam. Revenues from these sources were meant to serve as a waqf, or endowment, for the mosque's maintenance.

=== Entrance ===
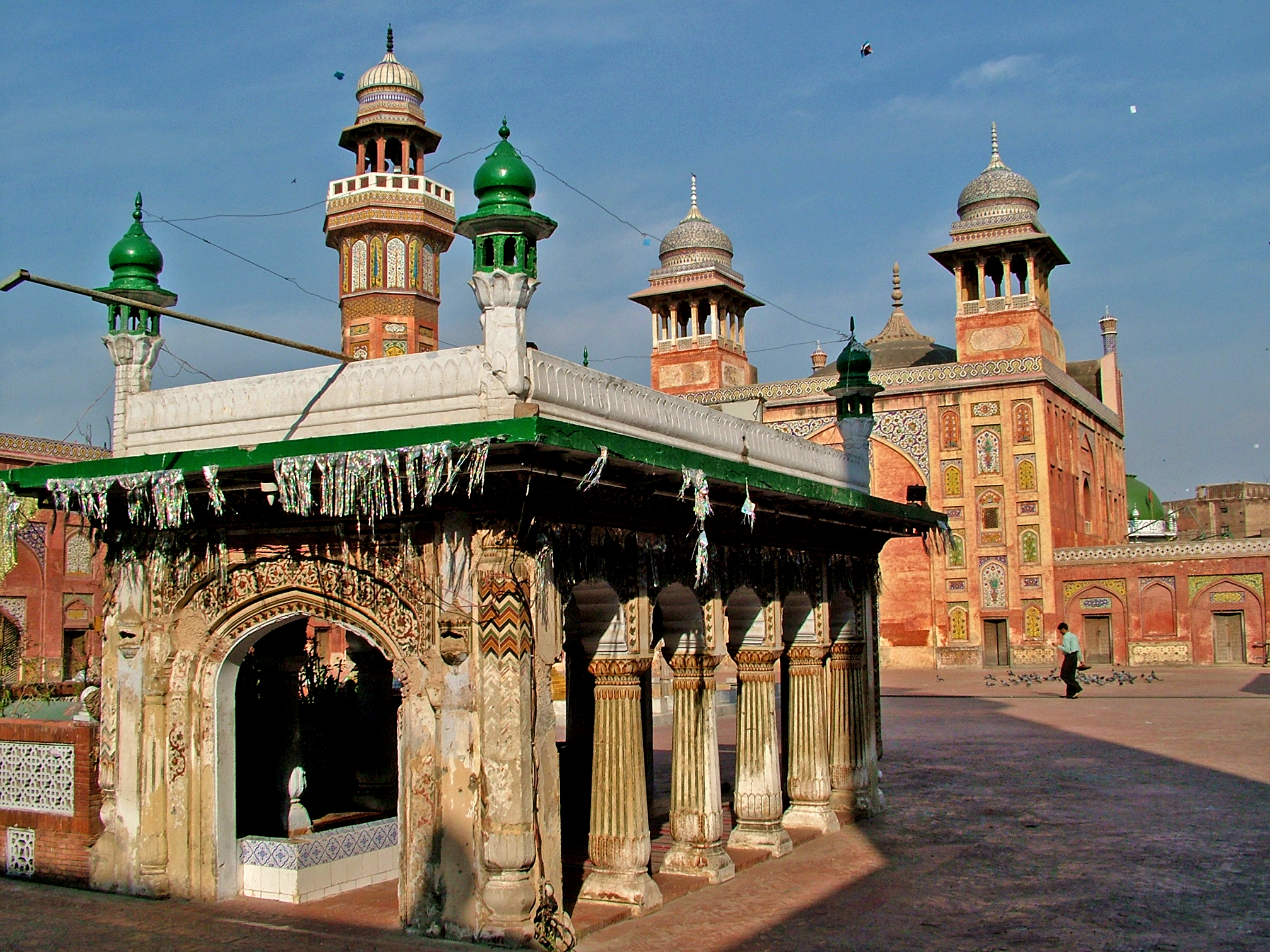
The mosque contains the tomb of the Sufi saint Syed Muhammad Ishaq Gazruni, also known as Miran Badshah.

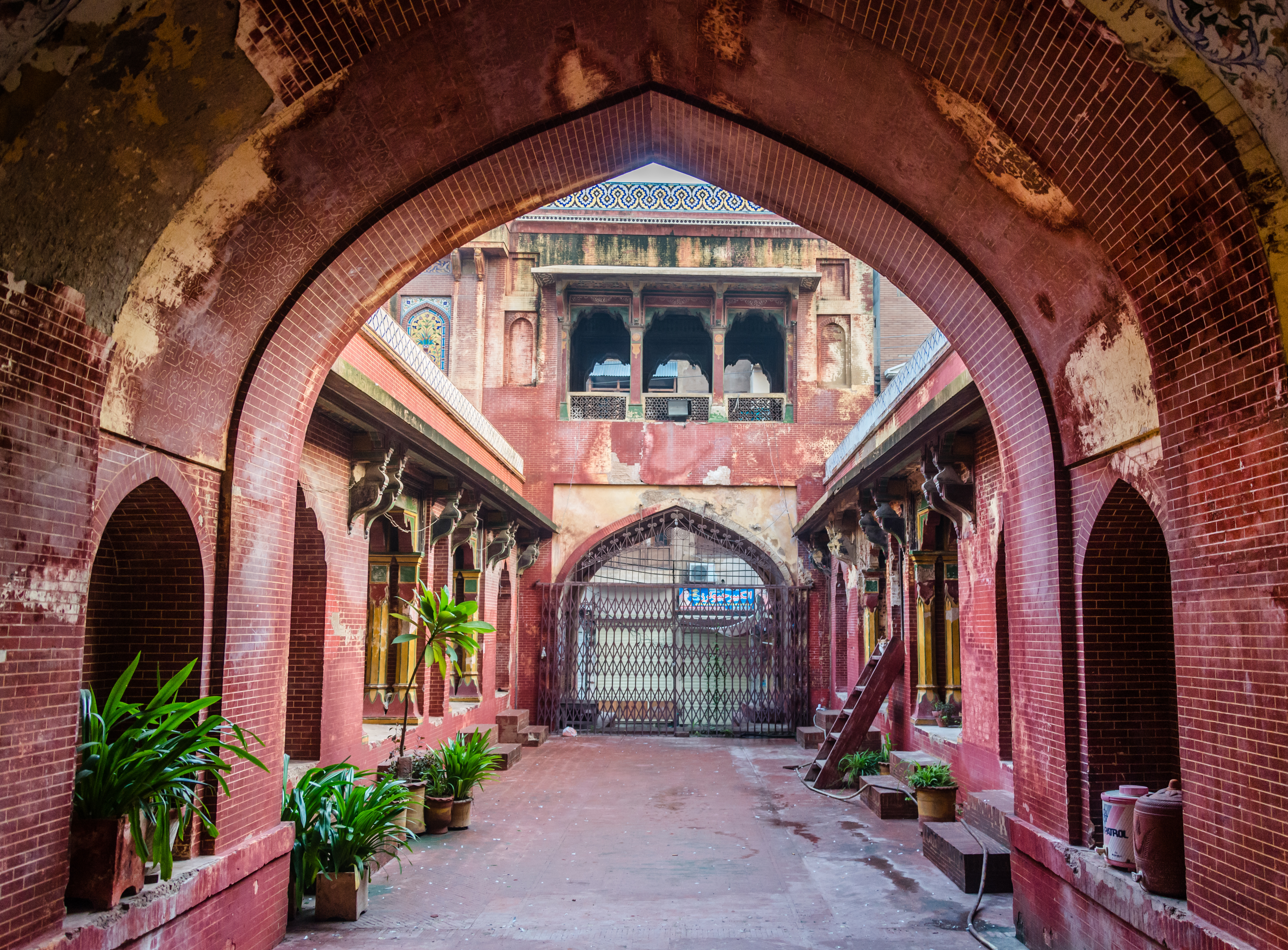
The mosque houses several shops in what is known as the "Calligrapher's Bazaar."

Entry into Wazir Khan Mosque is through a large Timurid-style Iwan over a smaller portal which faces the Wazir Khan Chowk. The iwan is flanked by two projecting balconies. Above the iwan is the Arabic Islamic declaration of faith written in intricate tilework. The panels flanking the iwan contain Persian quatrains written by the calligraphist Muhammad Ali, who was a disciple of the Sufi saint Mian Mir. The panel on the right of the iwan reads:

To all who turn towards the Qibla in prayer, may this door remain wide open with prosperity till the day of resurrection.

While the panel to the left of the iwan reads:

Tillers! Everything we sow in this world we will reap in the next. Lay a good foundation in this life, for everyone must pass through this gate to Paradise.

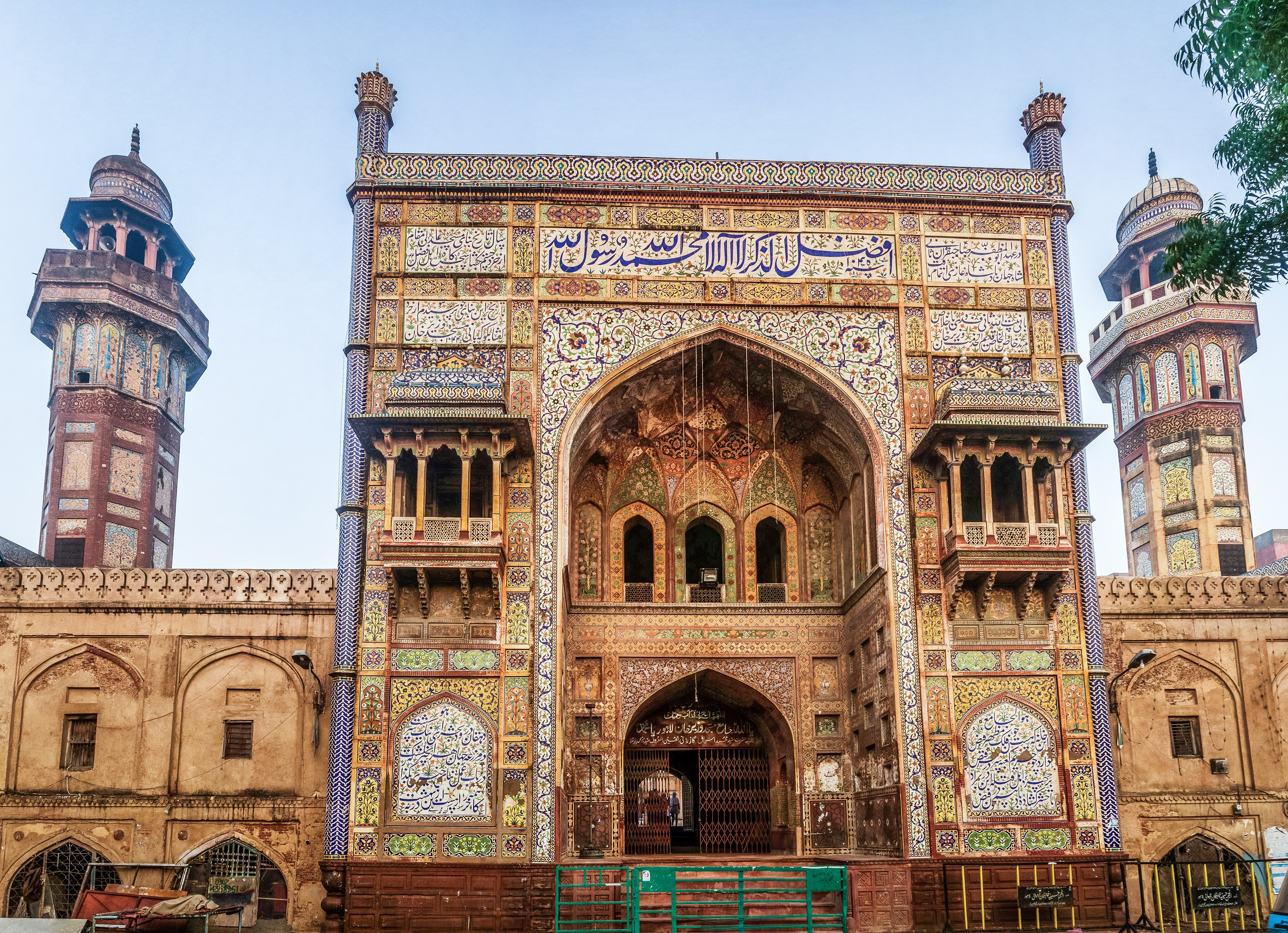
The mosque's entryway features a large iwan that leads to the Wazir Khan Chowk, a small town square.

Entry through the small portal leads into a covered octagonal chamber which lies in the centre of the mosque's "Calligrapher's Bazaar." The octagonal chamber lies in the centre of what is the first example of the Central Asian charsu bazaar concept, or four-axis bazaar, to be introduced into South Asia. Two of the four axes are aligned as the Calligrapher's Bazaar, while the other two align in a straight line from the mosque's entry portal, to the centre of the main prayer hall.

=== Courtyard ===
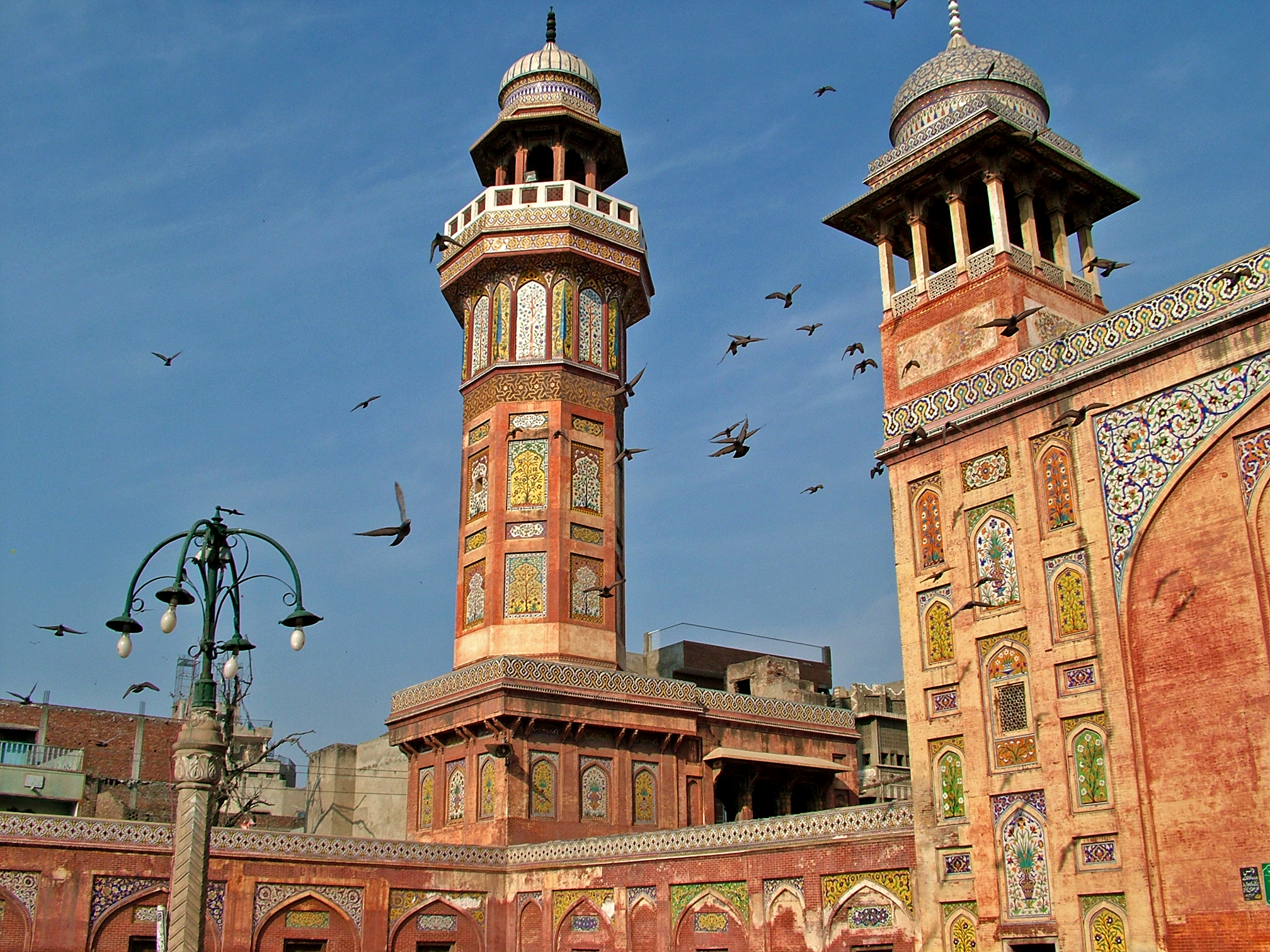
Façades facing the mosque's courtyard are embellished with intricate kashi-kari tile work.

Passage through the portal and octagonal chamber leads into the mosque's central courtyard. The courtyard measures approximately 160 feet by 130 feet, and features high arched galleries surrounding a central brick paved courtyard — a typical feature of imperial Persian mosques in Iran.

The mosque's courtyard contains a pool used for the Islamic ritual washing, wudu that measures 35 feet by 35 feet. The courtyard features a subterranean crypt which contains the tomb of the 14th century Sufi saint Syed Muhammad Ishaq Gazruni, also known by the name Miran Badshah.

The courtyard is flanked on four sides by 32 khanas, or small study cloisters for religious scholars. The mosque's four 107 foot tall minarets are located in each corner of the courtyard.

=== Main prayer hall ===
The mosque's prayer hall lies at the westernmost portion of the site, and is approximately 130 feet long and 42 feet wide. It is divided into five sections aligned into a single long aisle running north to south, similar to the prayer hall at the older Mosque of Mariyam Zamani Begum.

The central section of the prayer hall is topped by a 31 foot tall dome with a diameter of 23 feet resting upon four arches that form a square pavilion — a Persian architectural form known as a Char Taq. The remaining compartment in the prayer hall are topped by a 21 foot tall dome with a diameter of 19 feet, built in a style similar to that of the earlier Lodi dynasty. The northernmost and southernmost compartments also contain small cells which house spiral staircases that lead to the rooftop.

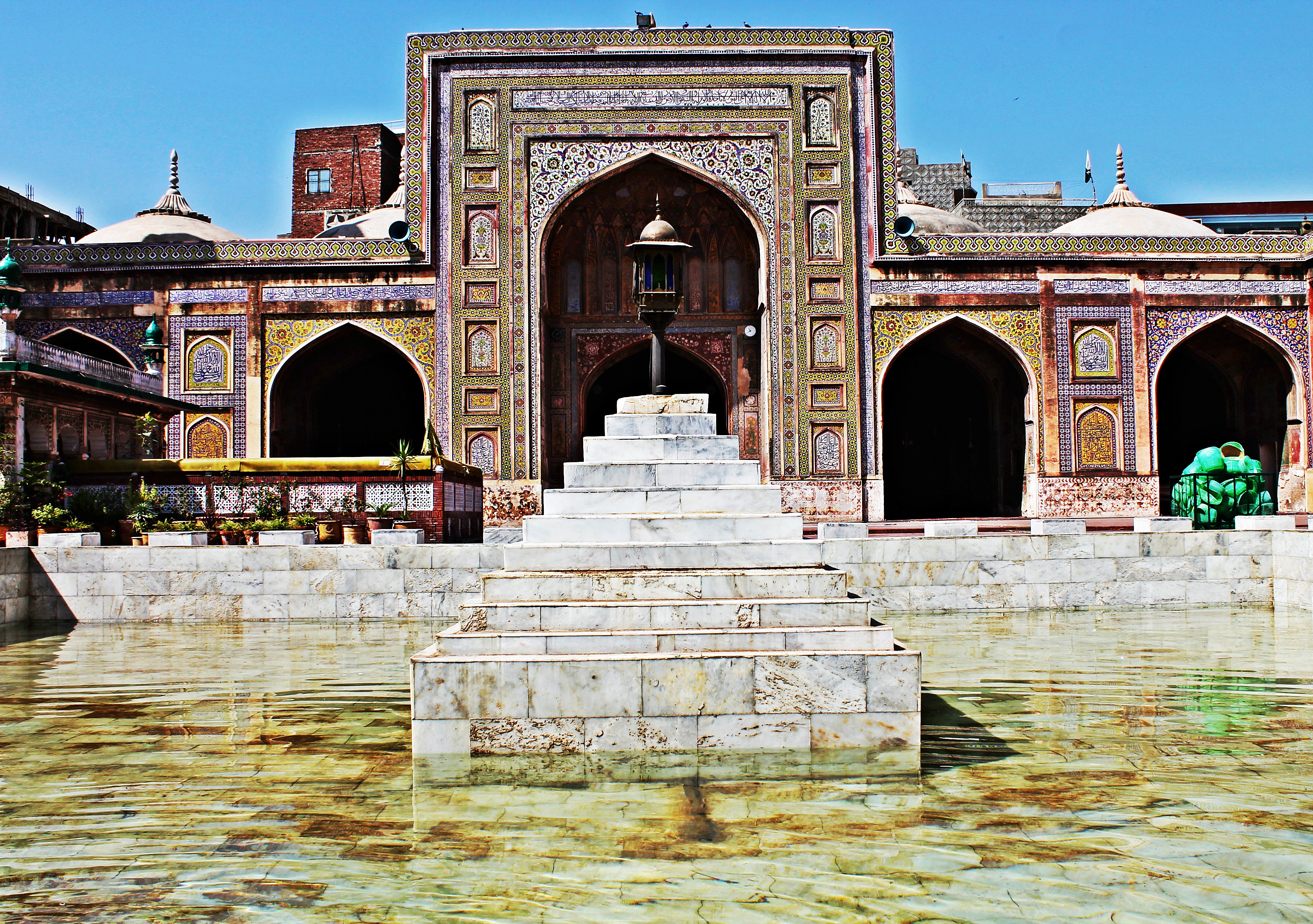
The main prayer hall opens to an ablution pool.

Walls of the prayer hall's interior are also decorated with calligraphy in both Arabic and Persian. Each wall is divided further, and contain unique mosaic designs. The acoustic properties of the dome allow for the imam's sermon to be projected across the mosque's courtyard.

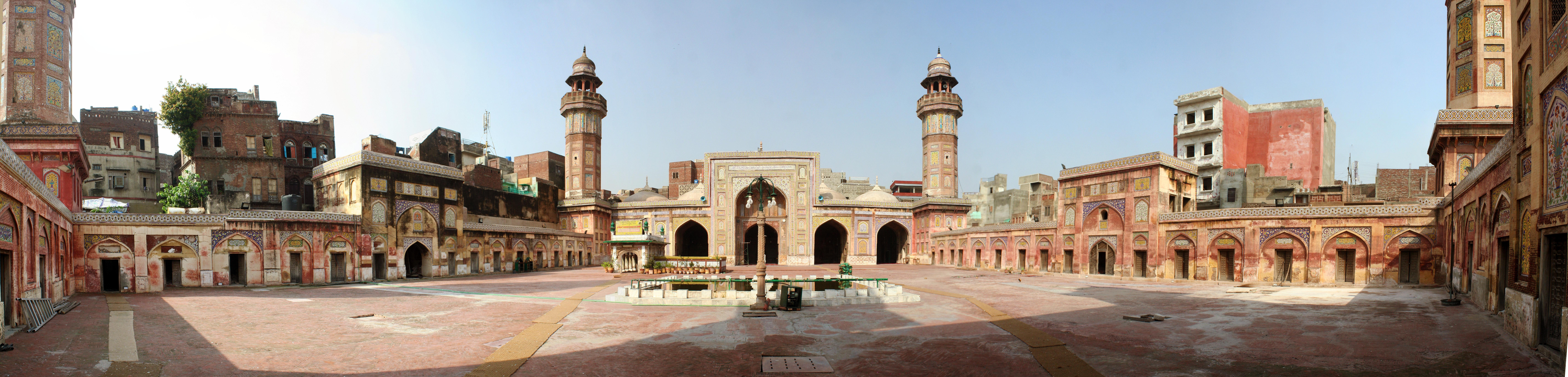
Panorama of the mosque's courtyard facing towards the mosque's prayer hall.

== Conservation ==
The mosque complex is listed on the Protected Heritage Monuments of the Archaeology Department of Punjab. In 1993 the site was added to UNESCO's tentative list for World Heritage Site status. In 2004, the Government of Punjab embarked on conservations and restoration efforts for the mosque. In 2007, the Aga Khan Trust for Culture partnered with the Government of Punjab to restore the monument, and in 2009 began a two year long in-depth survey of the mosque as part of a larger effort to restore the Walled City of Lahore. In 2015, the site was mapped in 3D through a partnership between the Lahore University of Management Sciences and the United States Agency for International Development.

=== Restoration ===
The mosque has been under extensive restoration since 2009 under the direction of the Aga Khan Trust for Culture and the Government of Punjab, with contributions from the governments of Germany, Norway, and the United States. Restoration works at Wazir Khan Mosque began in 2004.

In 2012, the Pilot Urban Conservation and Infrastructure Improvement Project—the Shahi Guzargah Project was launched by the Government of Punjab and the Aga Khan Trust for culture which restored a section of Shahi Guzargah between the mosque and Delhi Gate. The project was completed in 2015 with support from the governments of Norway and the United States of America.

Prior to completion of the project's first phase, the vicinity around the Wazir Khan mosque had been encroached upon by illegally erected shops which blocked off much of the mosque from the surrounding neighbourhood. Tangled power lines further spoiled views of the mosque, and the Wazir Khan Chowk had been badly neglected and had shrunk in size due to illegally constructed shops. The first phase of the project removed illegally constructed shops, restoring views of the mosque. Wazir Khan Chowk was extensively rehabilitated by removal of encroachments, while the well of Dina Nath was restored. Power lines along the project corridor were also placed underground, and the Chitta Gate at the eastern entrance to Wazir Khan Chowk was rehabilitated.

== Gallery ==
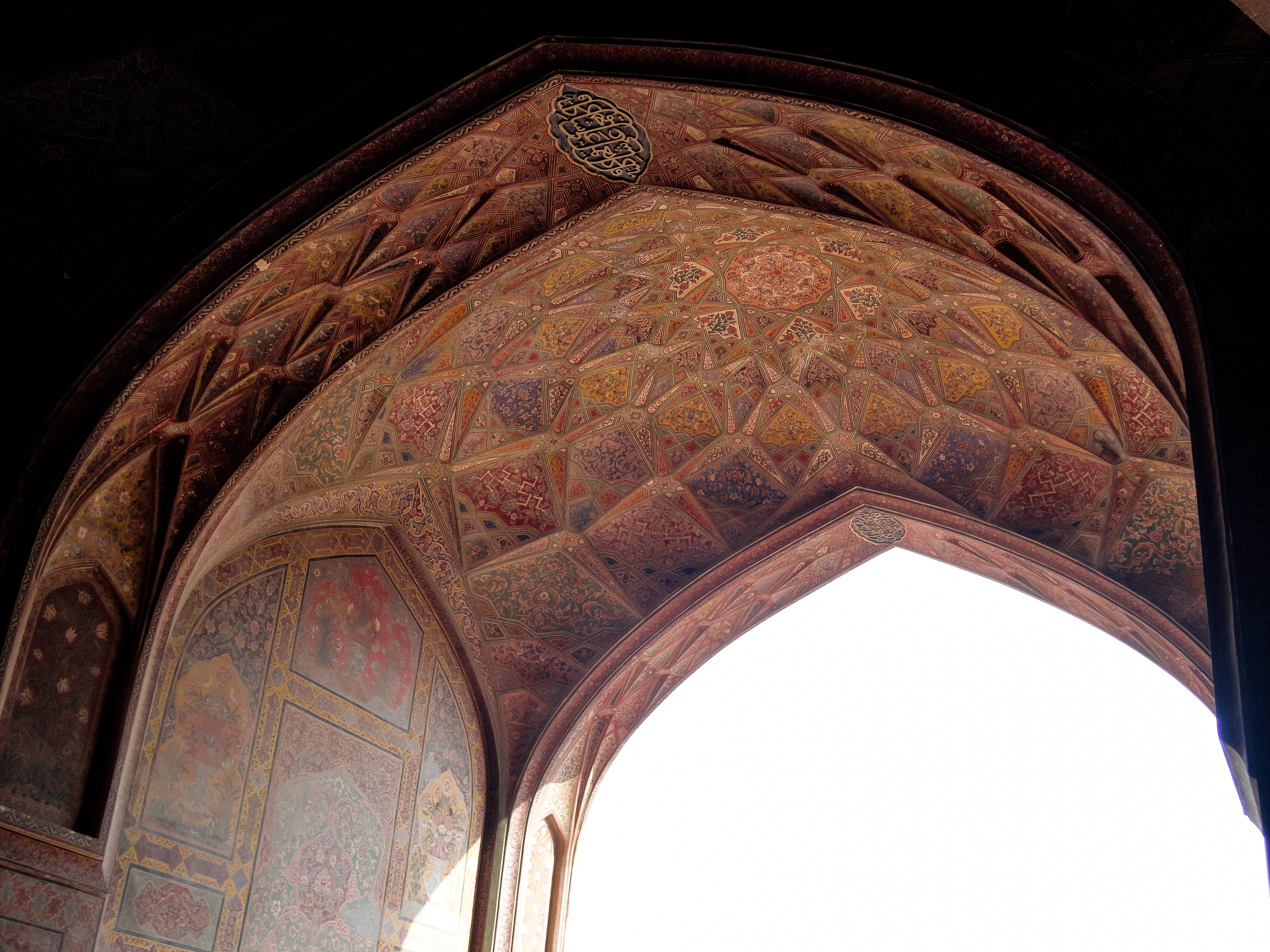
The mosque features one of the earliest muqarnas in South Asia.

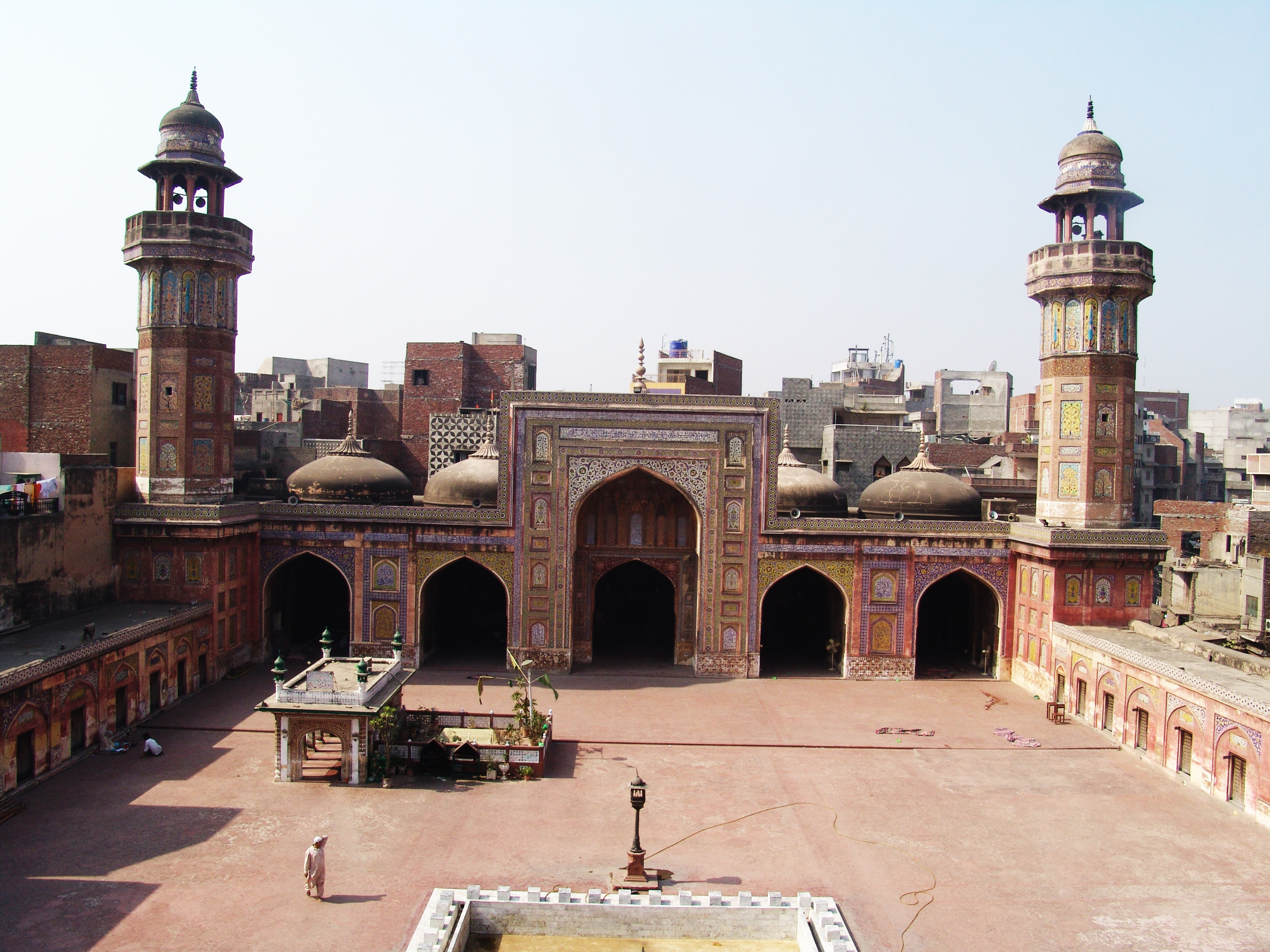
A view of the main prayer chamber

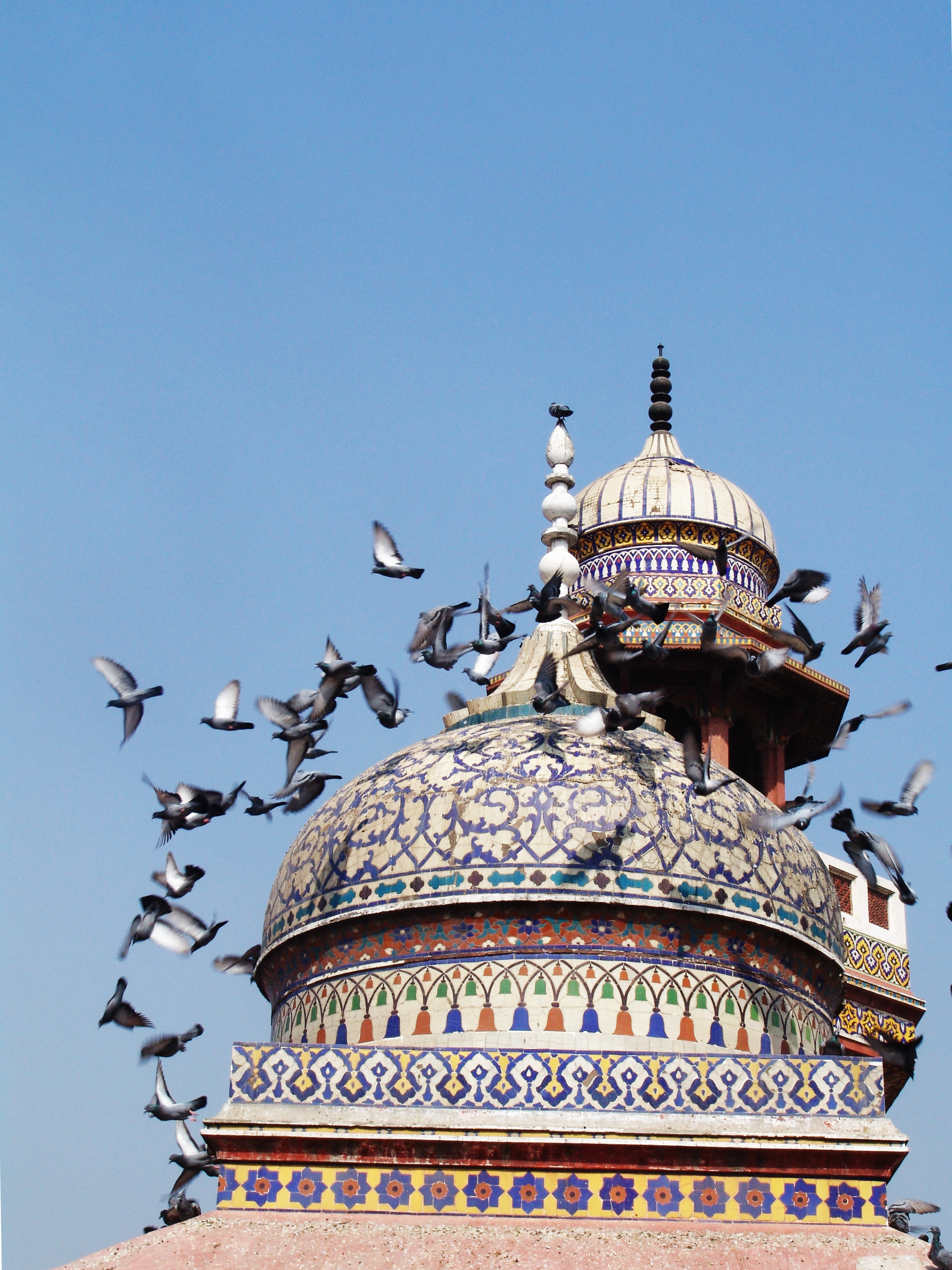
The mosque's dome is decorated with tile work.

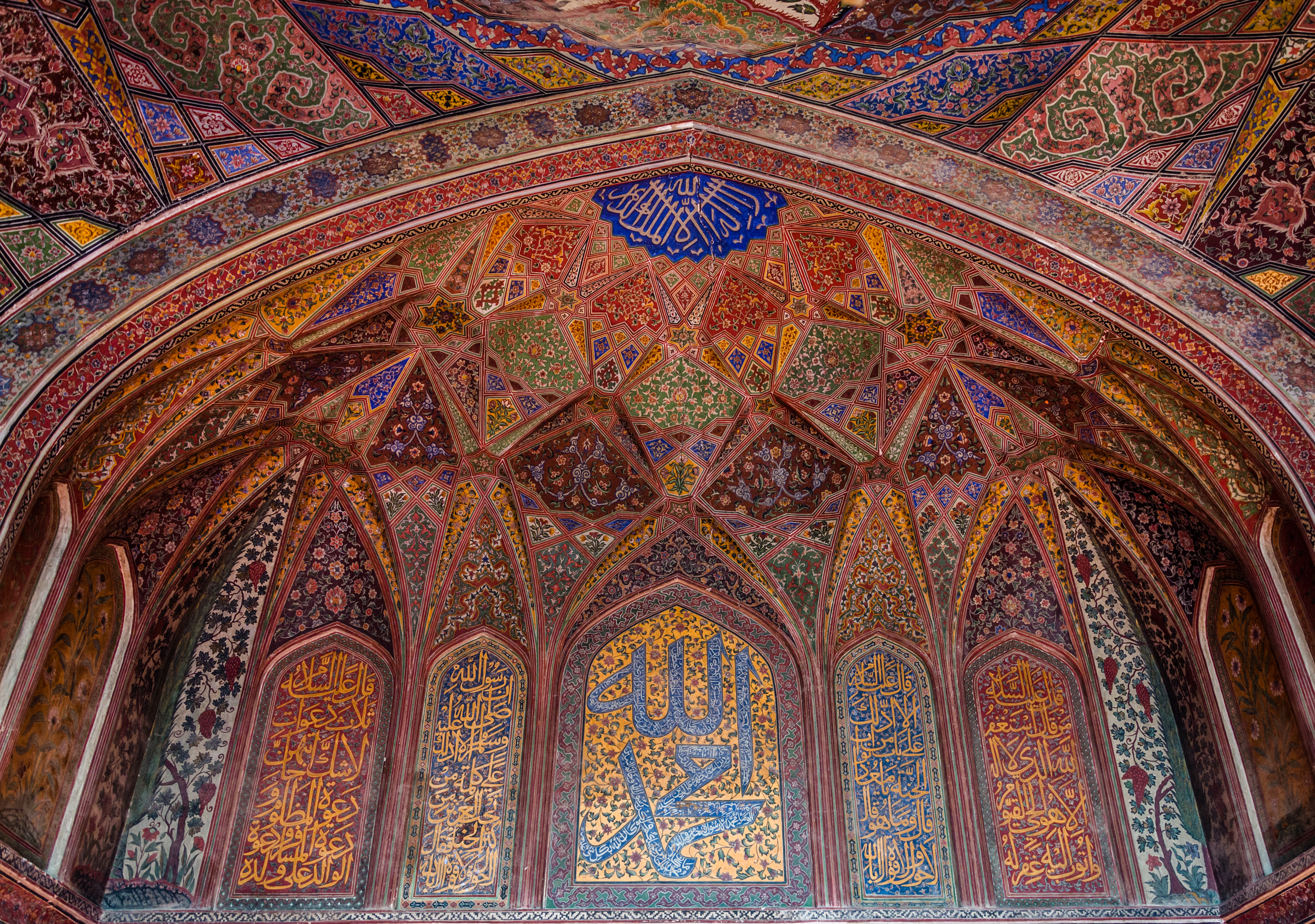
Richly embellished muqarna

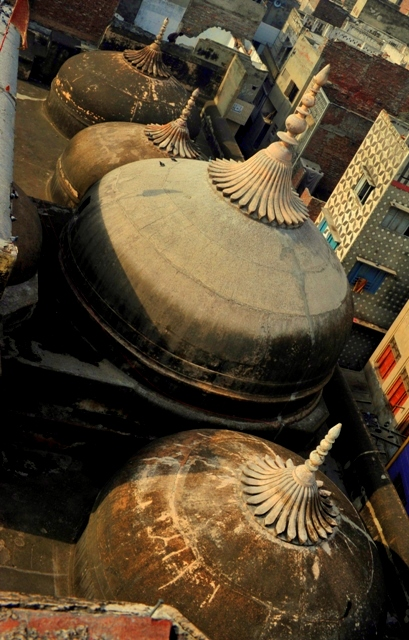
The mosque features short Lodi-style domes.

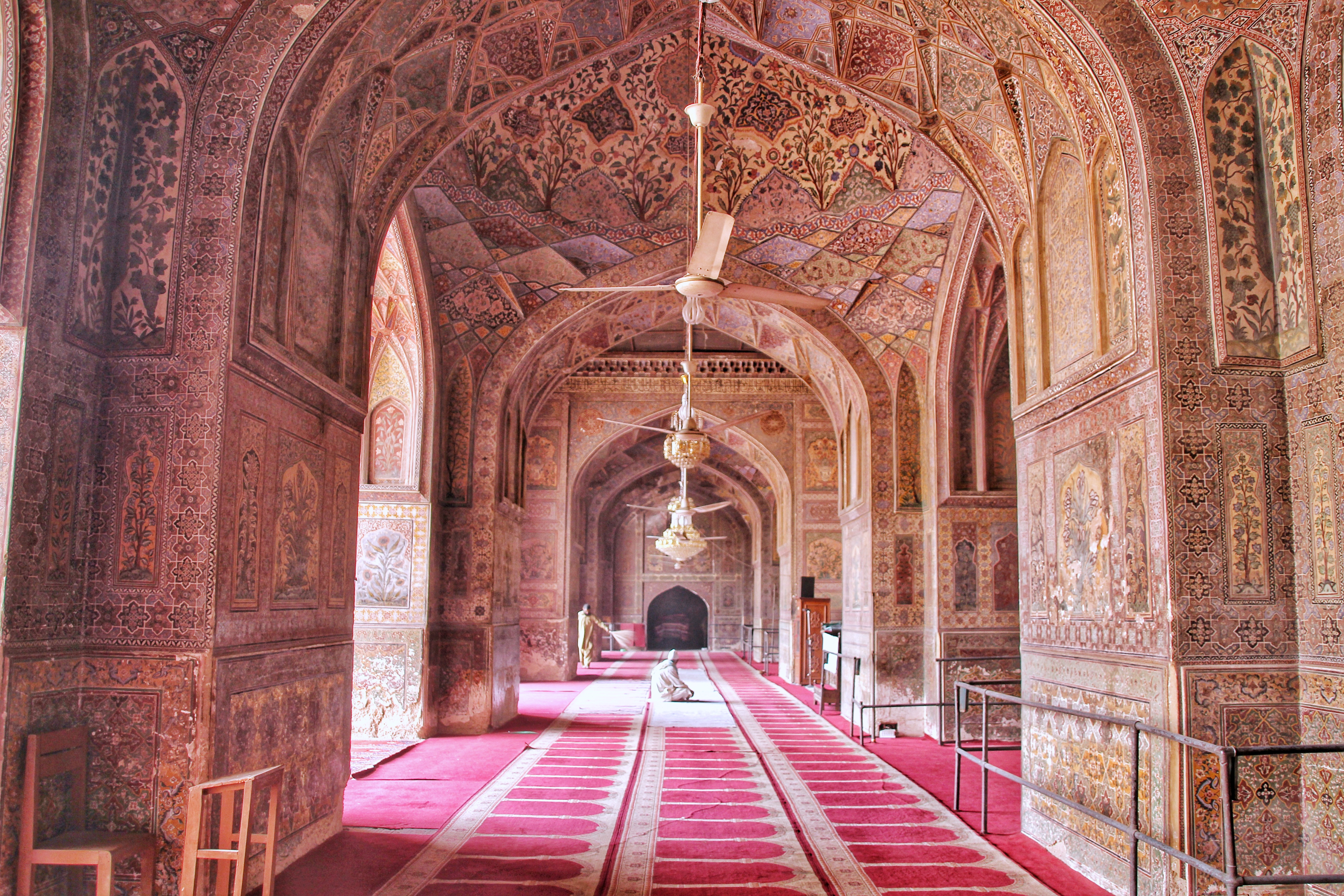
Interior surface embellishments

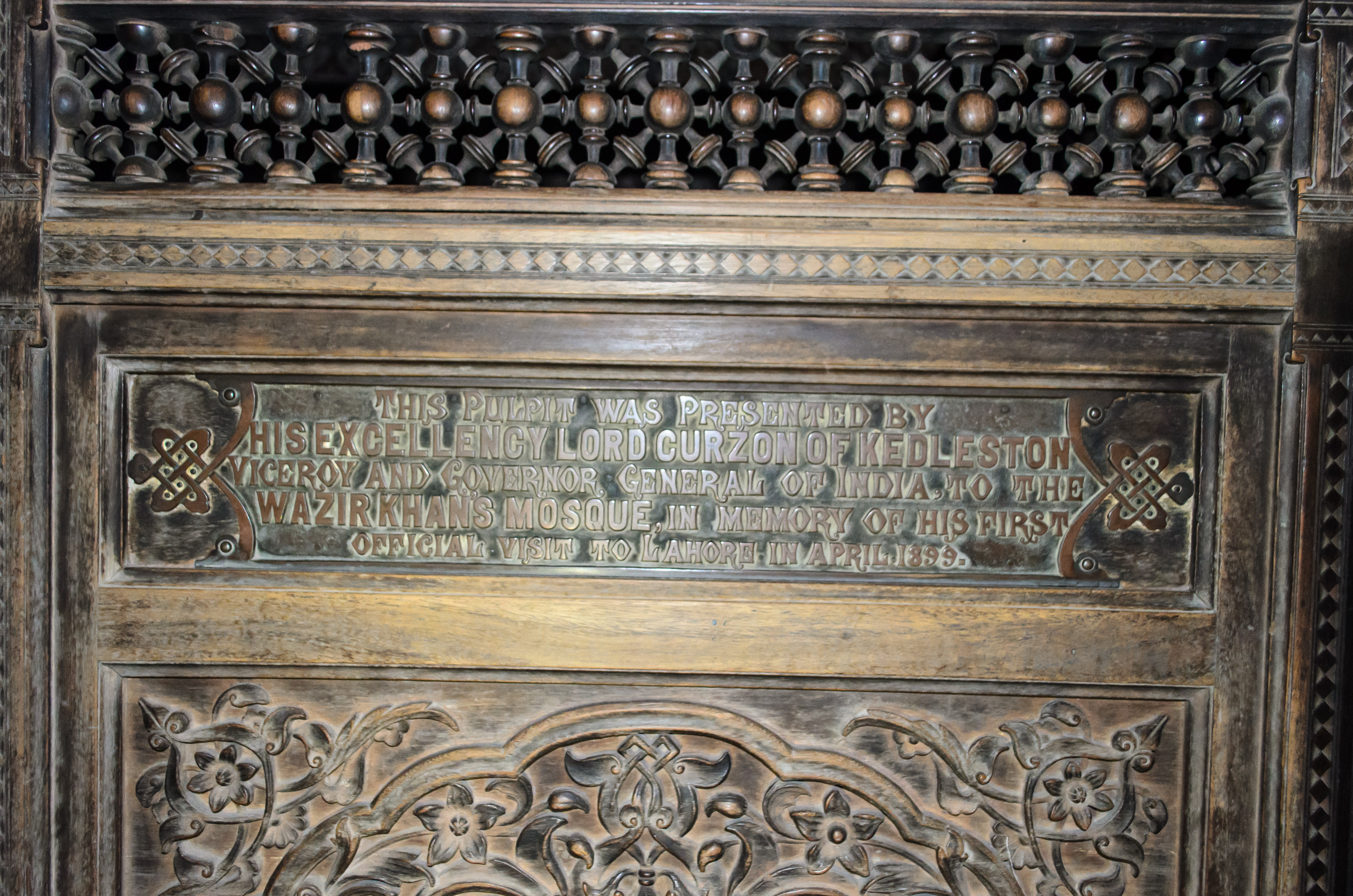
The mosque's pulpit dates from the colonial era

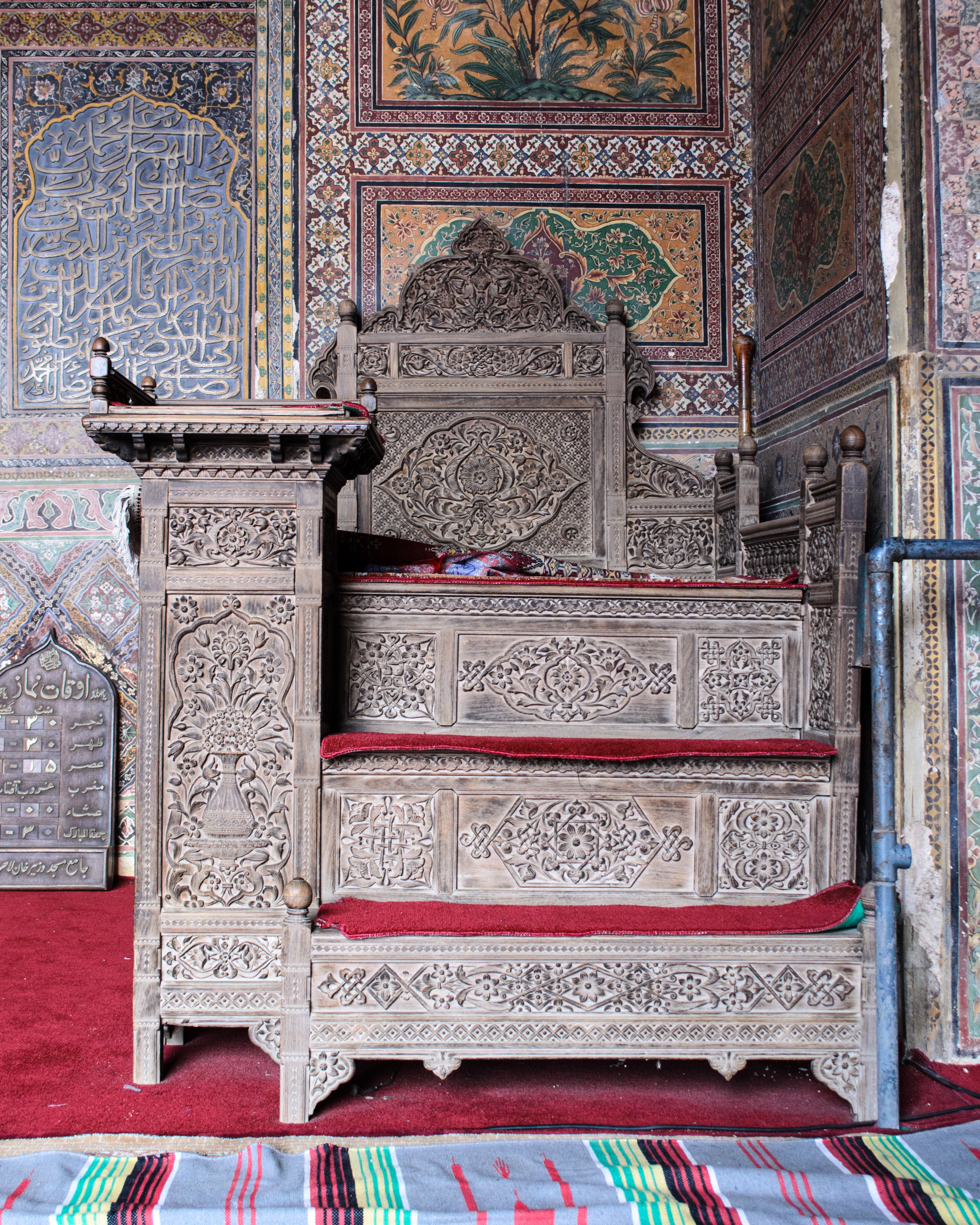
The mosque's pulpit

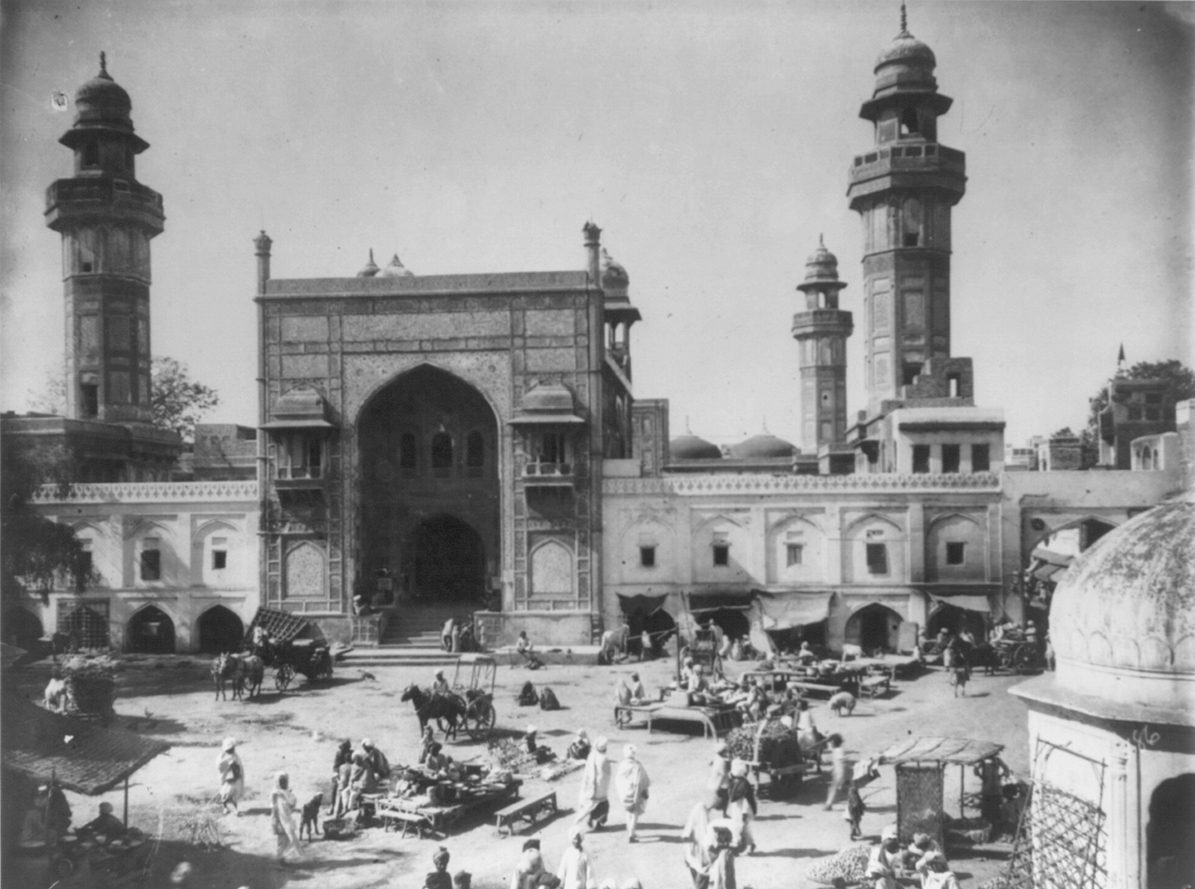
Wazir Khan Mosque in 1895.

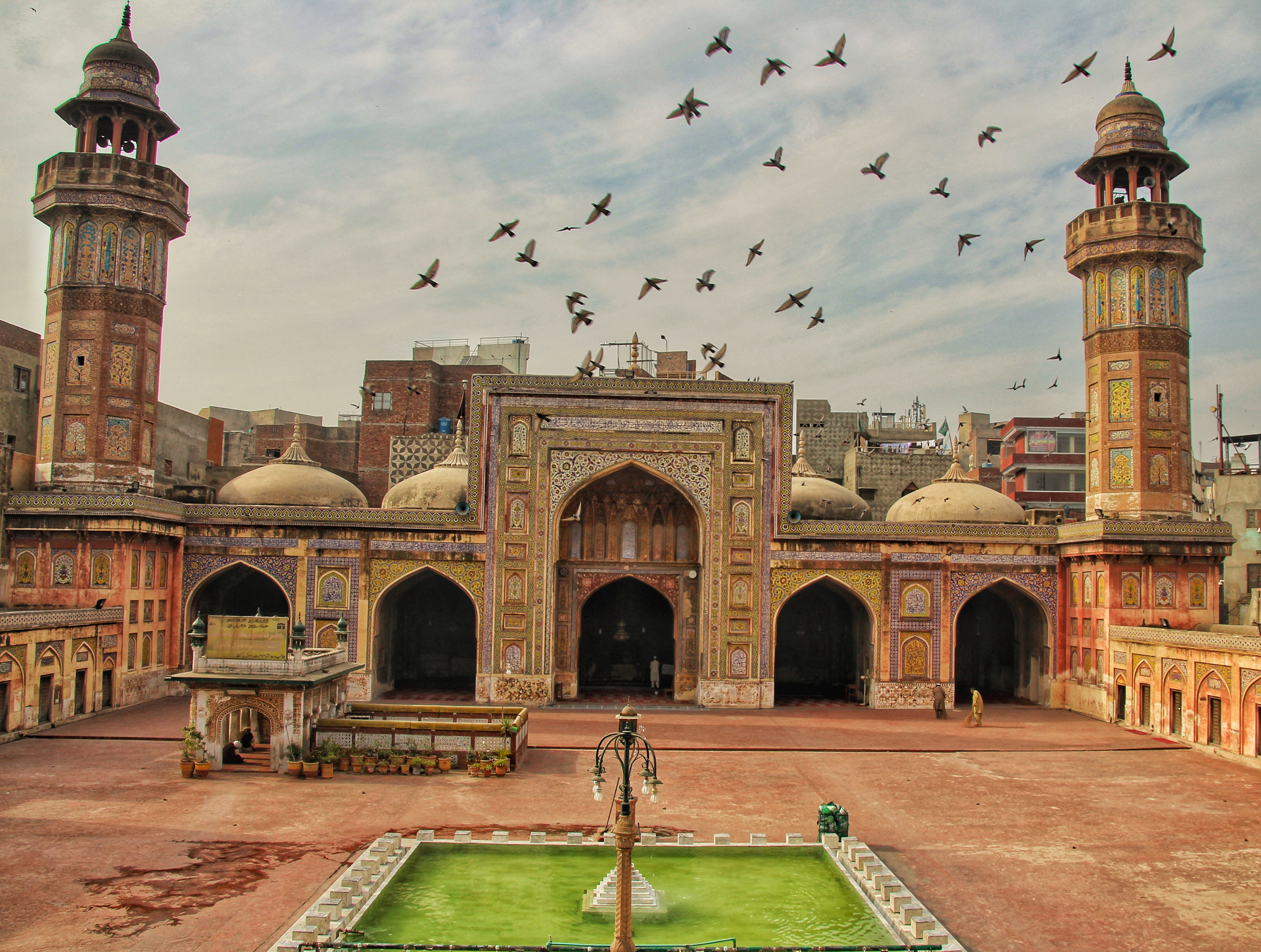
The mosque's courtyard

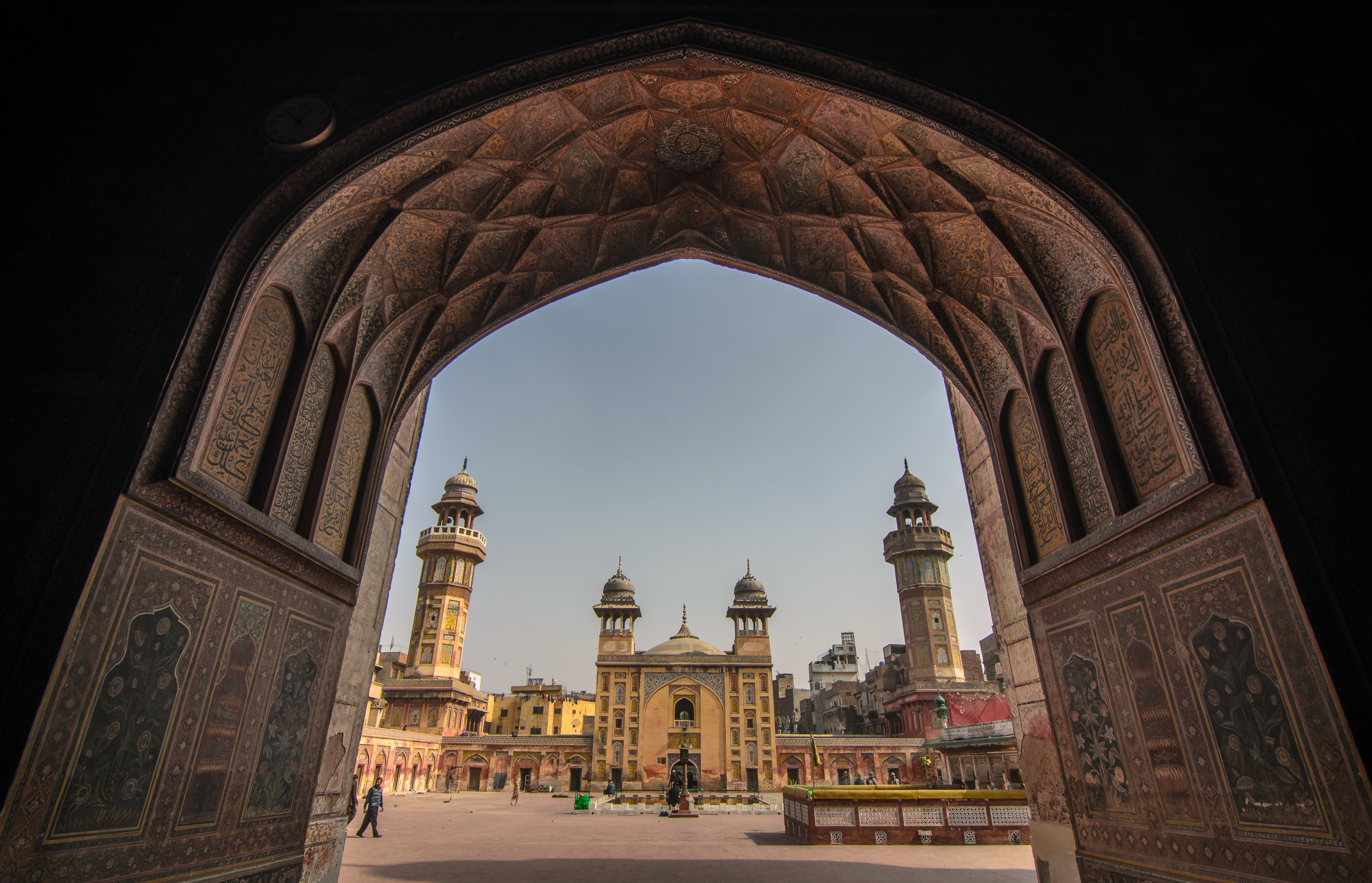
A view of the mosque through an archway

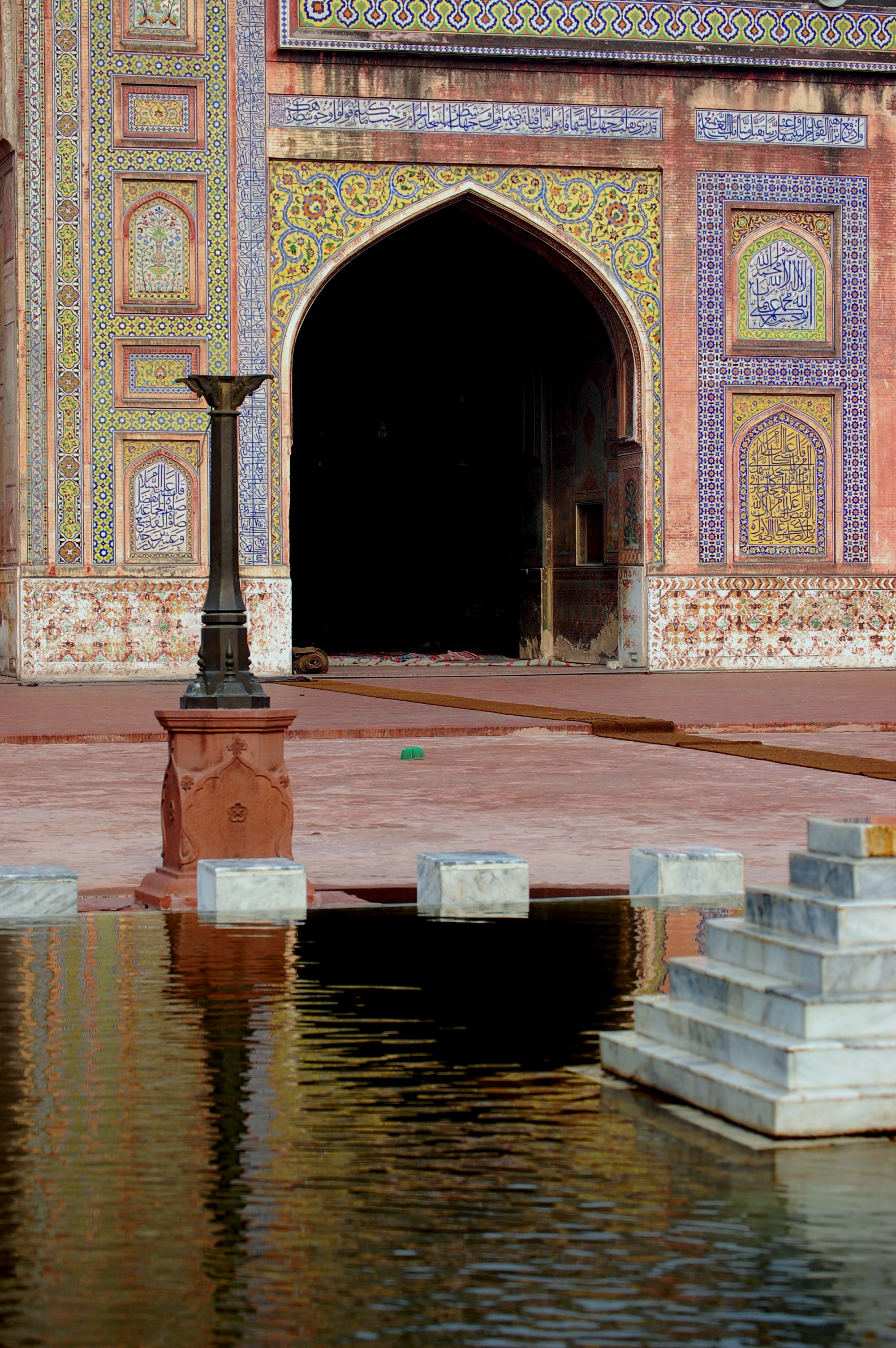
The courtyard ablution pool features a small fountain.

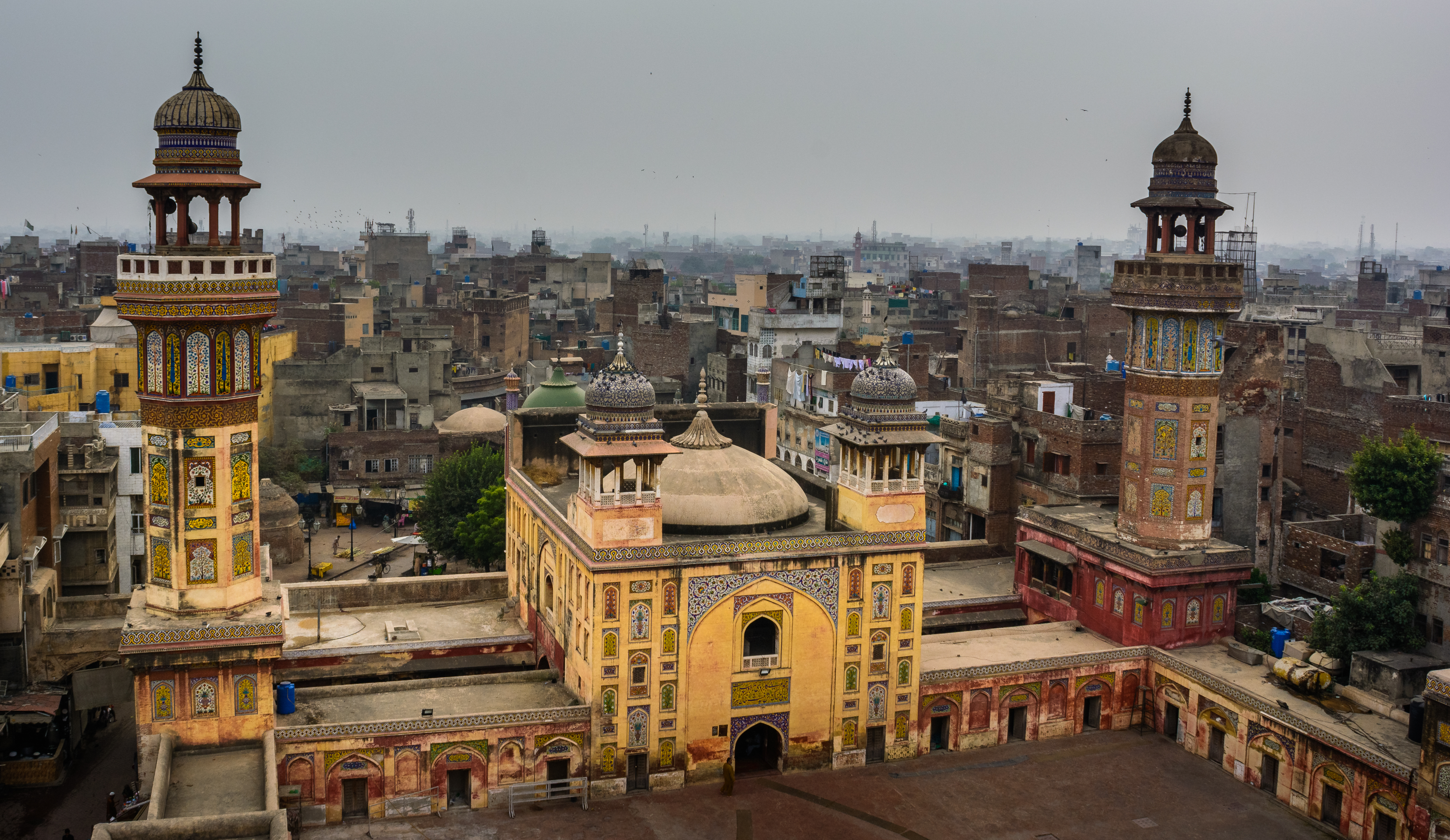
The mosque after a rainstorm

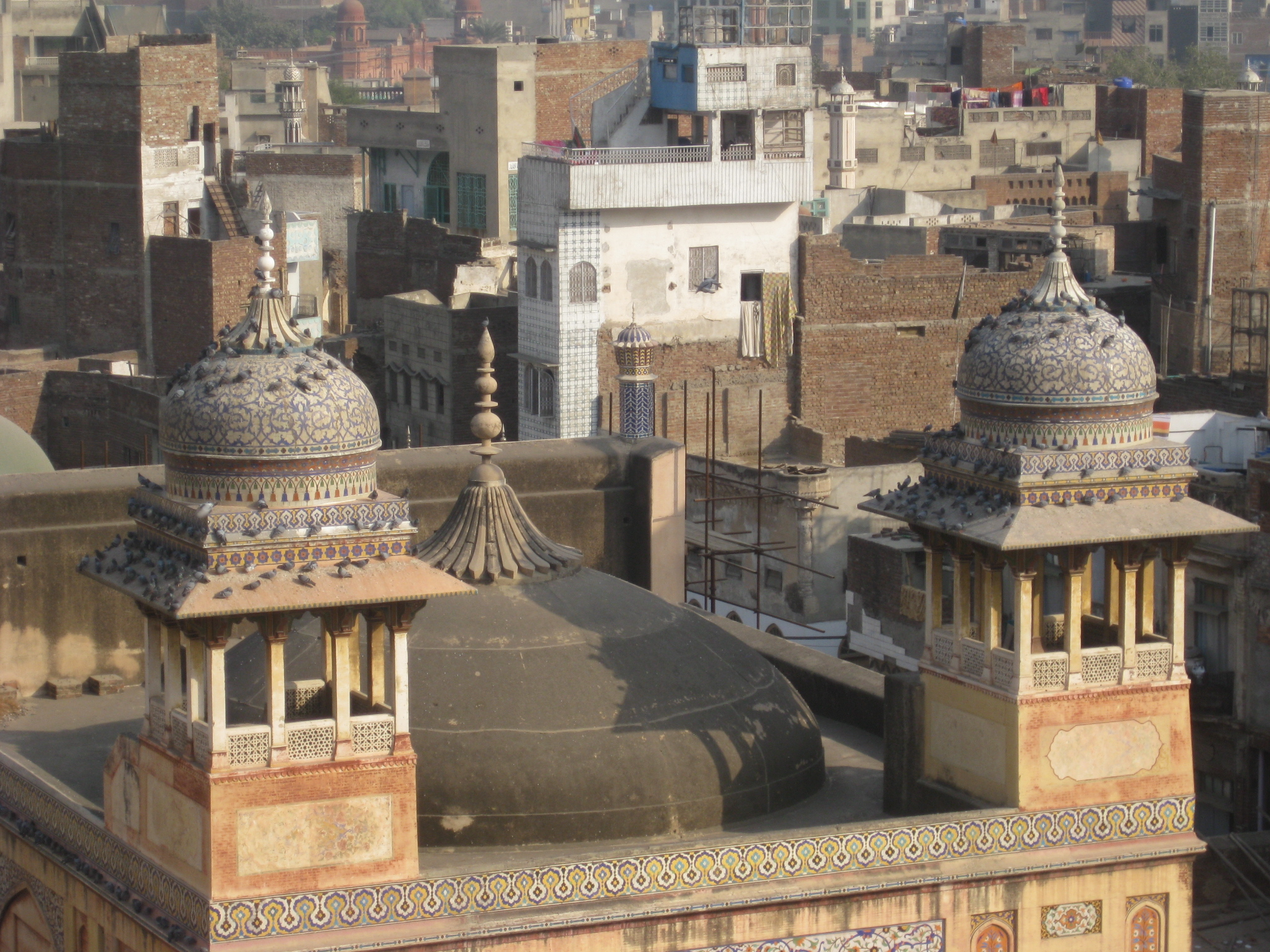
The entrance to the main prayer hall has two small towers.

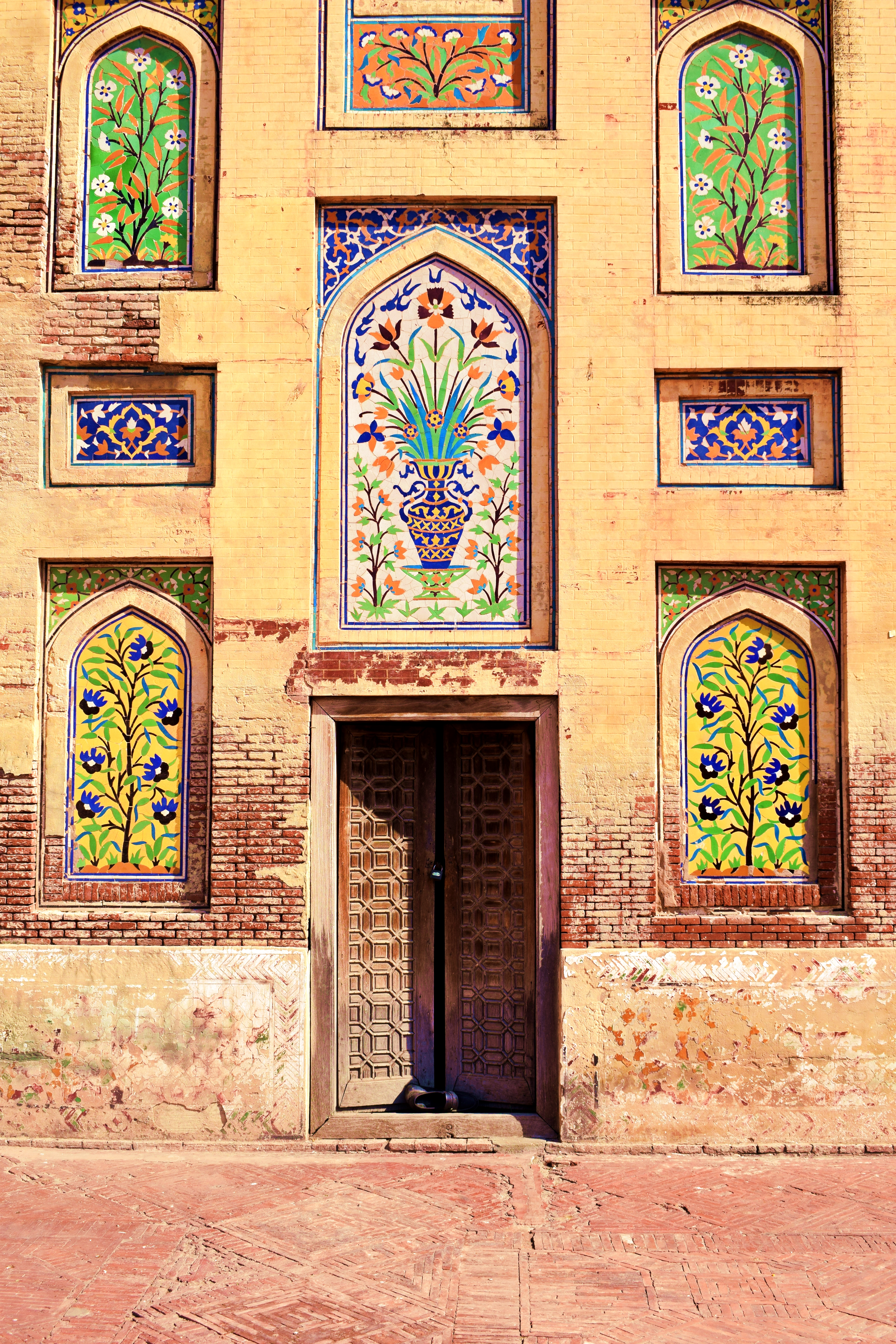
Decorative tile panels on the mosque's exterior

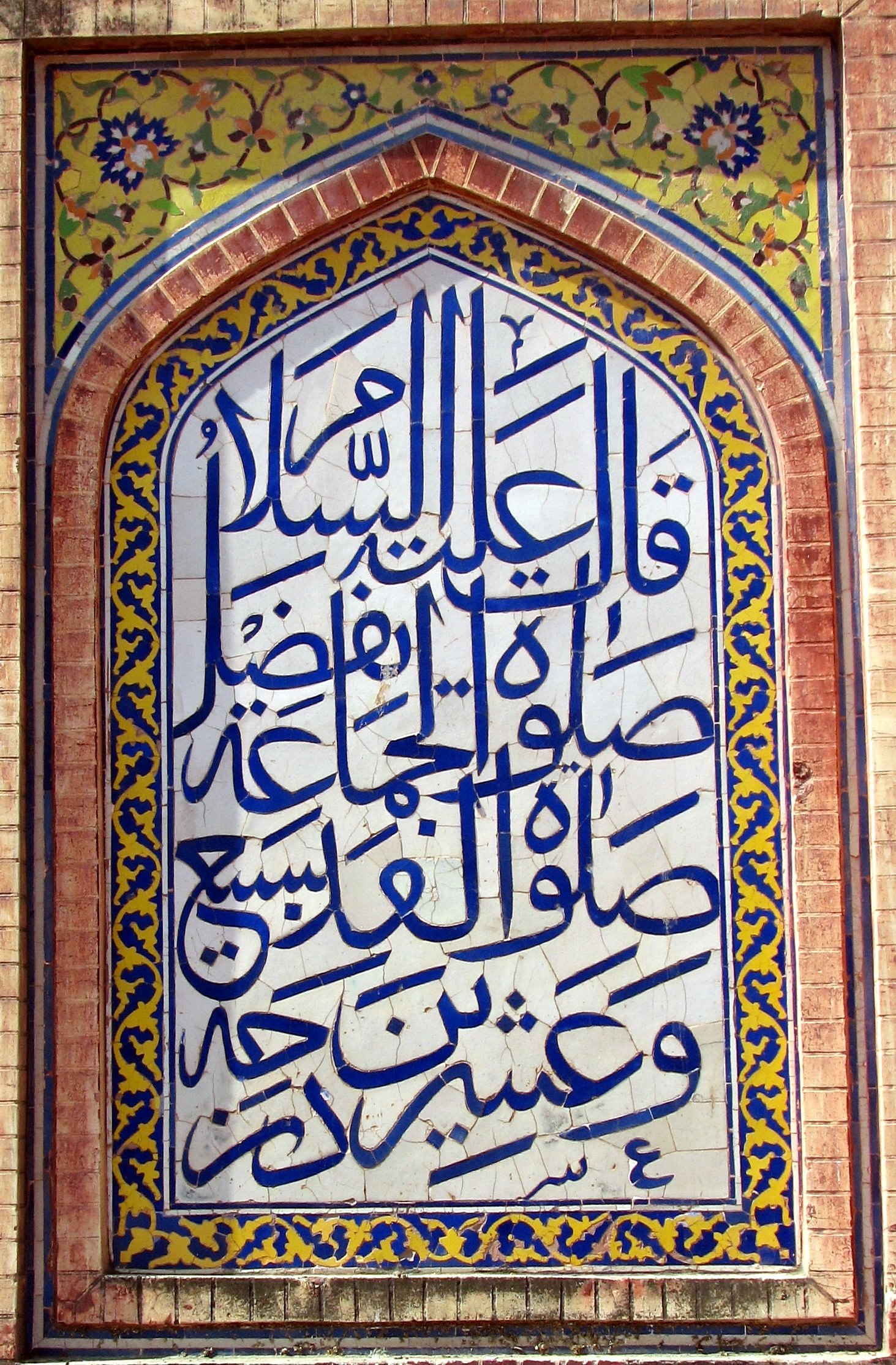
Arabic calligraphy on glazed tile.

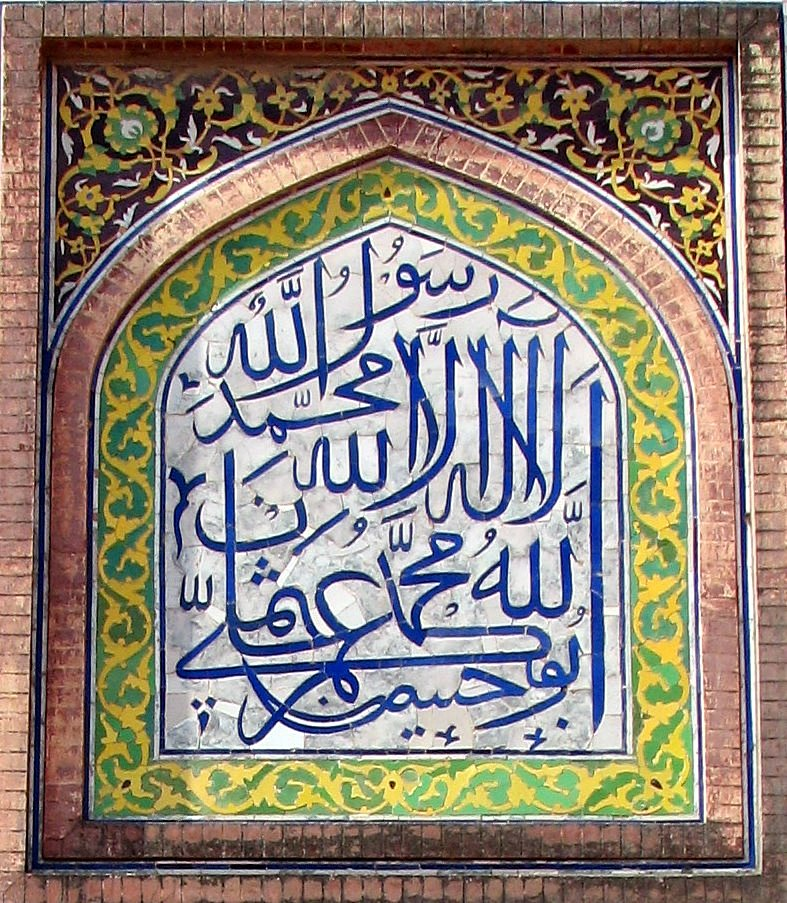
Arabic calligraphy on glazed tile.

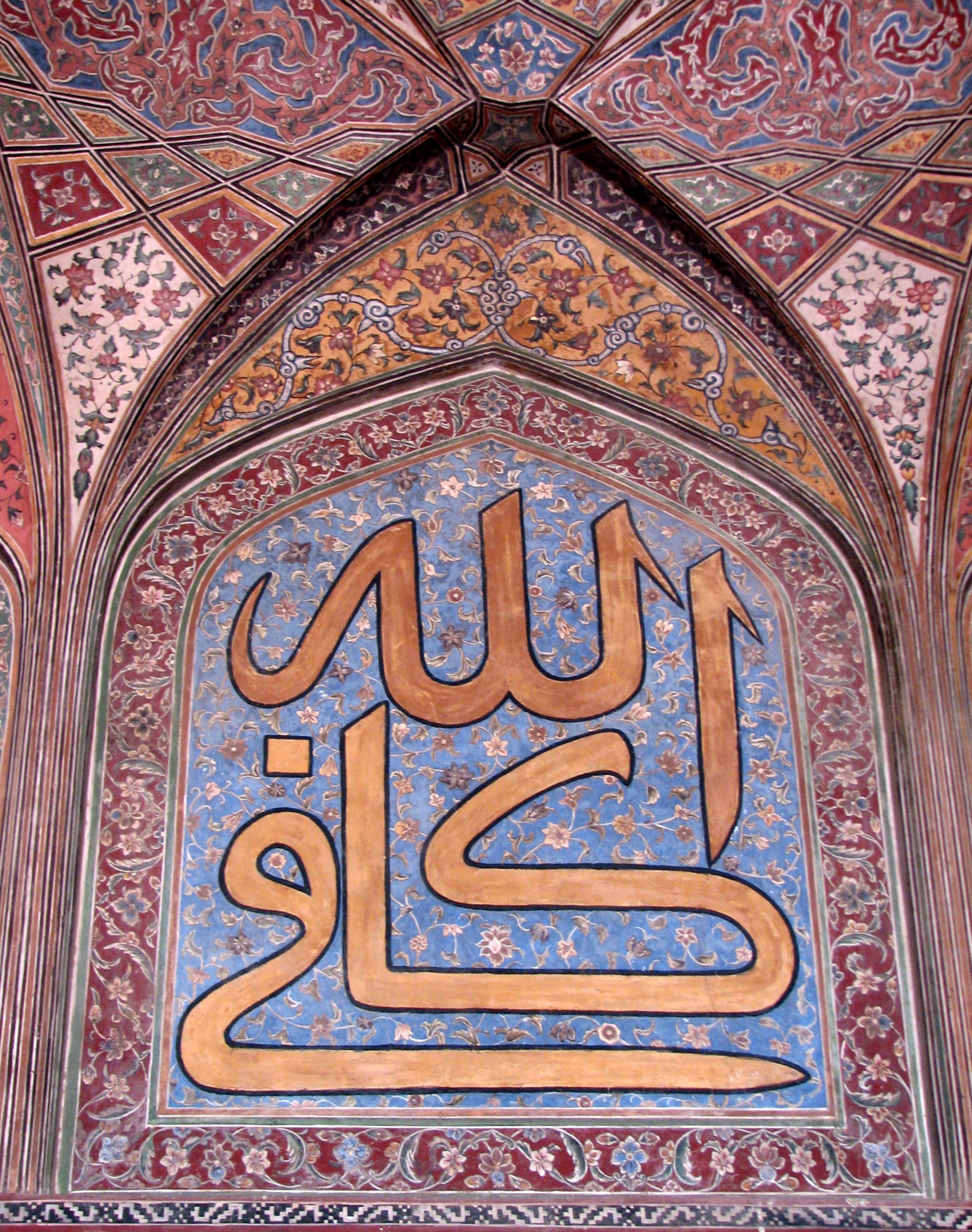
Arabic calligraphy on glazed tile: "God is aplenty".

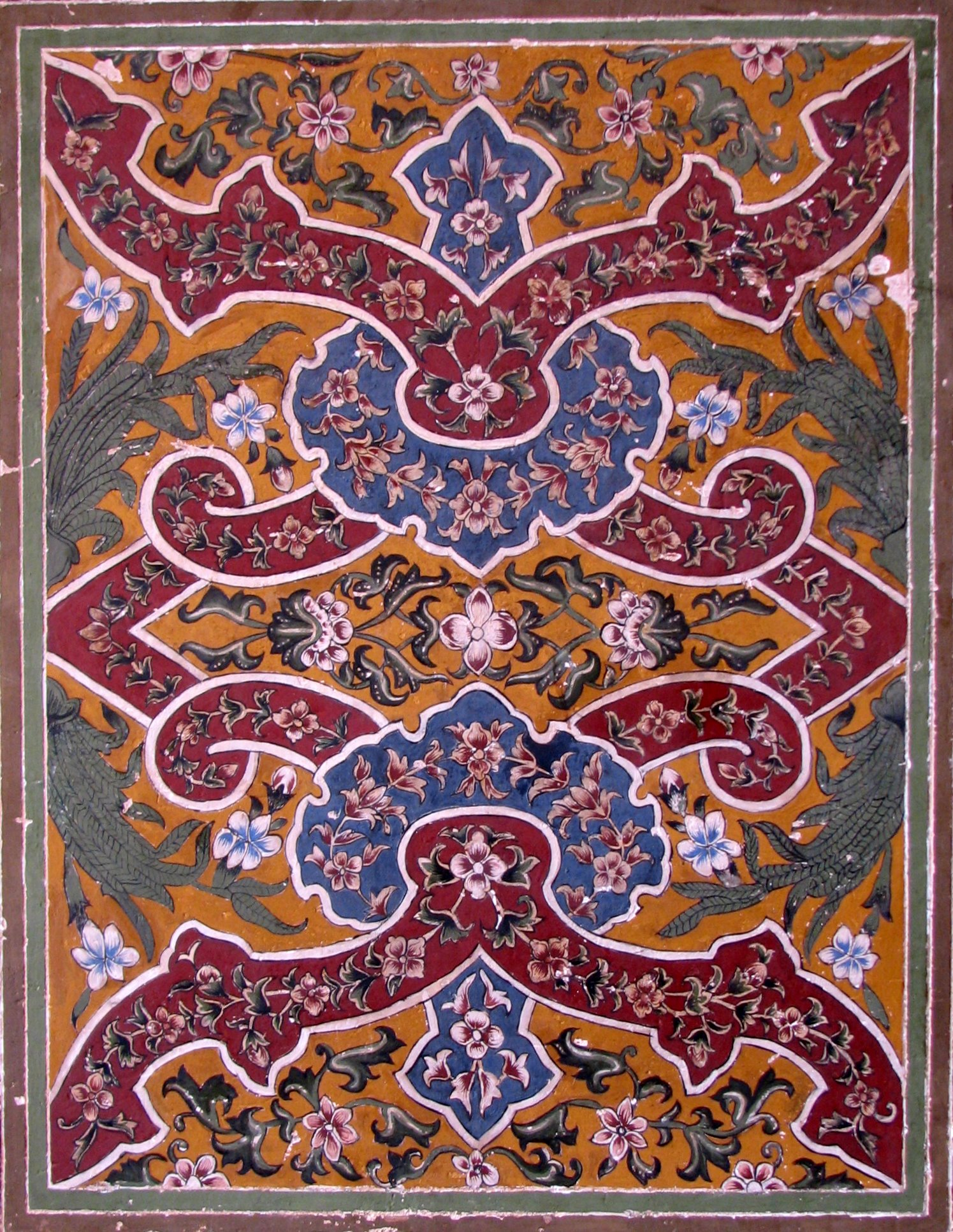
Fresco in prayer chamber.

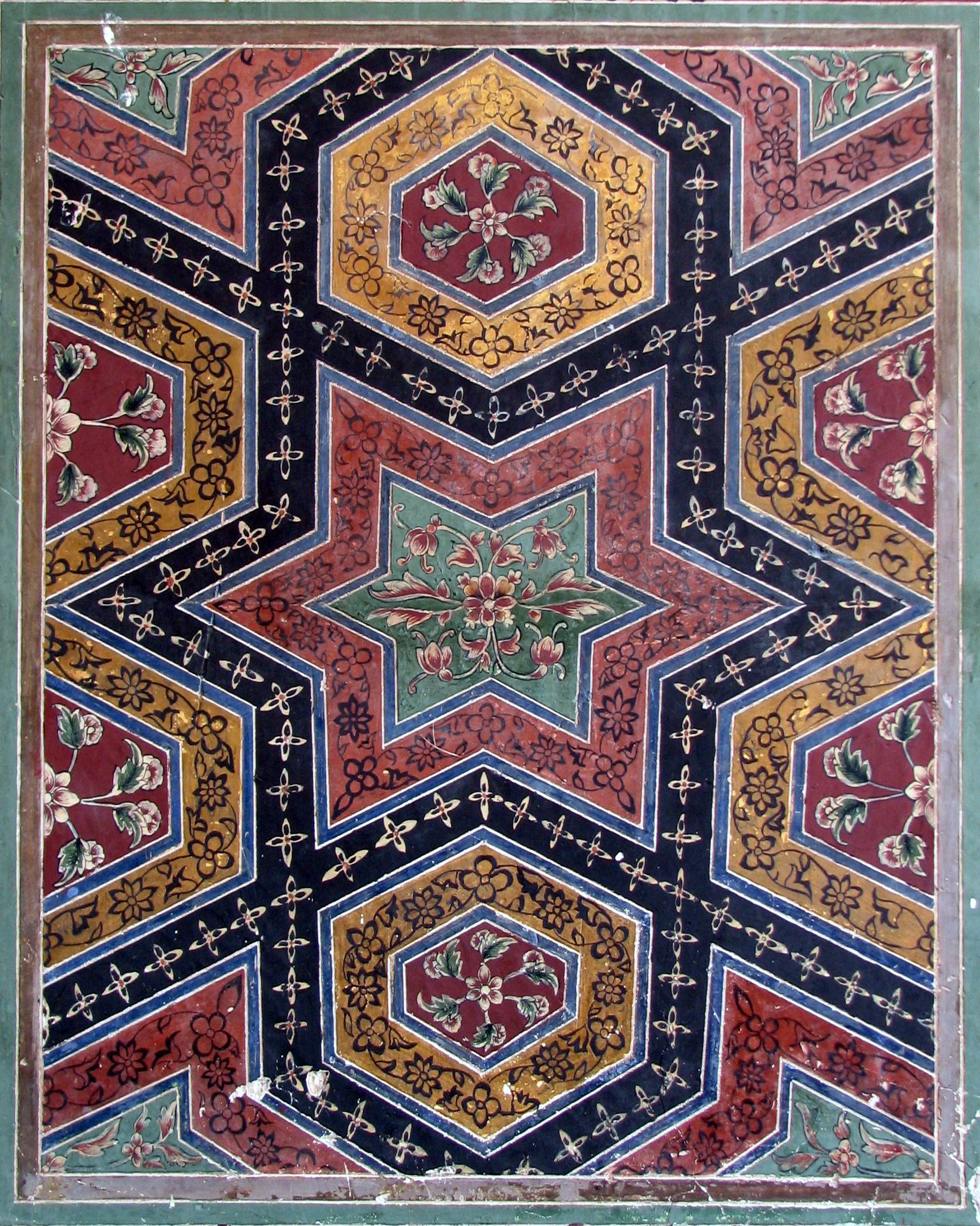
Fresco in prayer chamber.

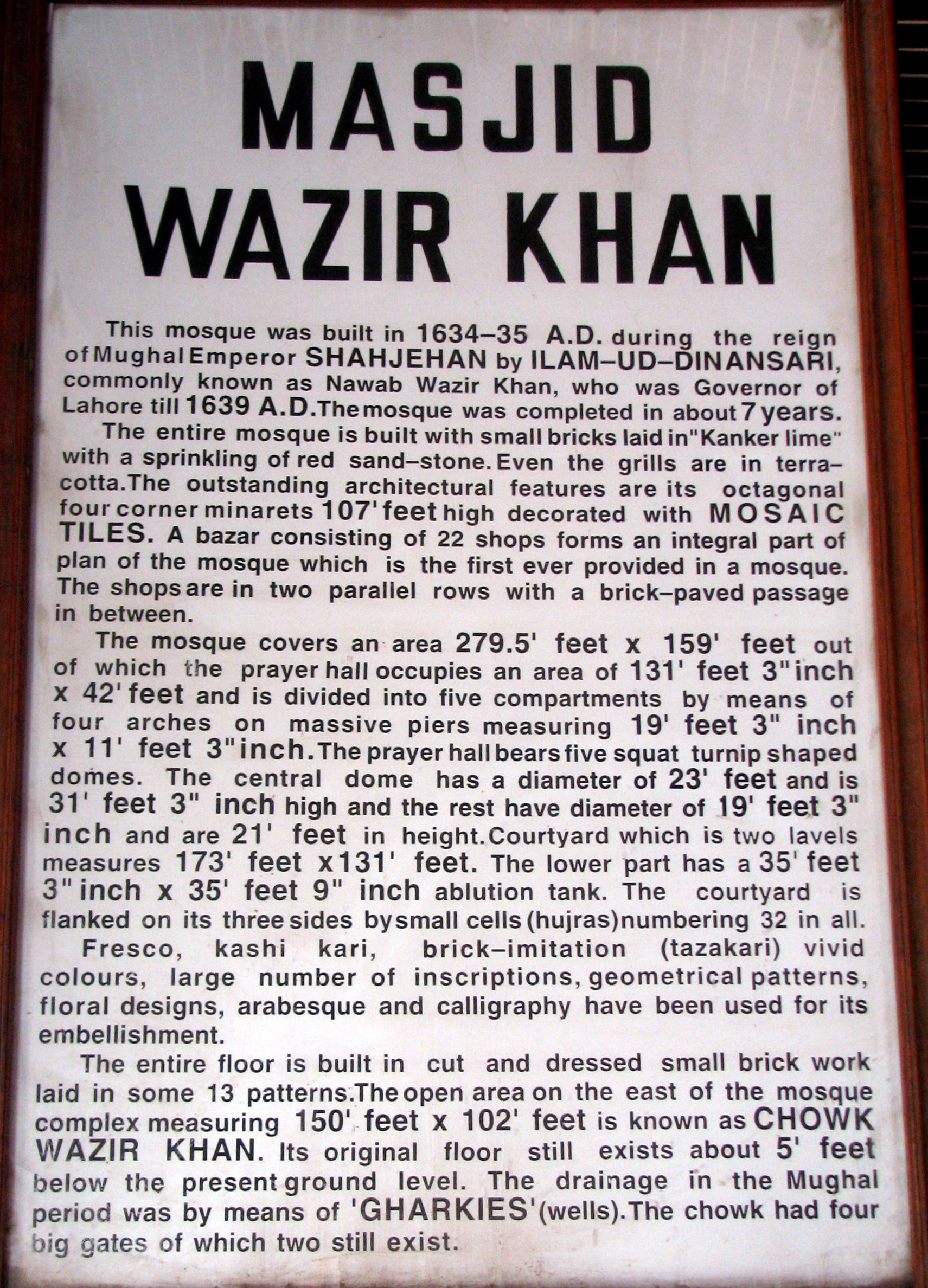
Plaque at Wazir Khan Mosque.

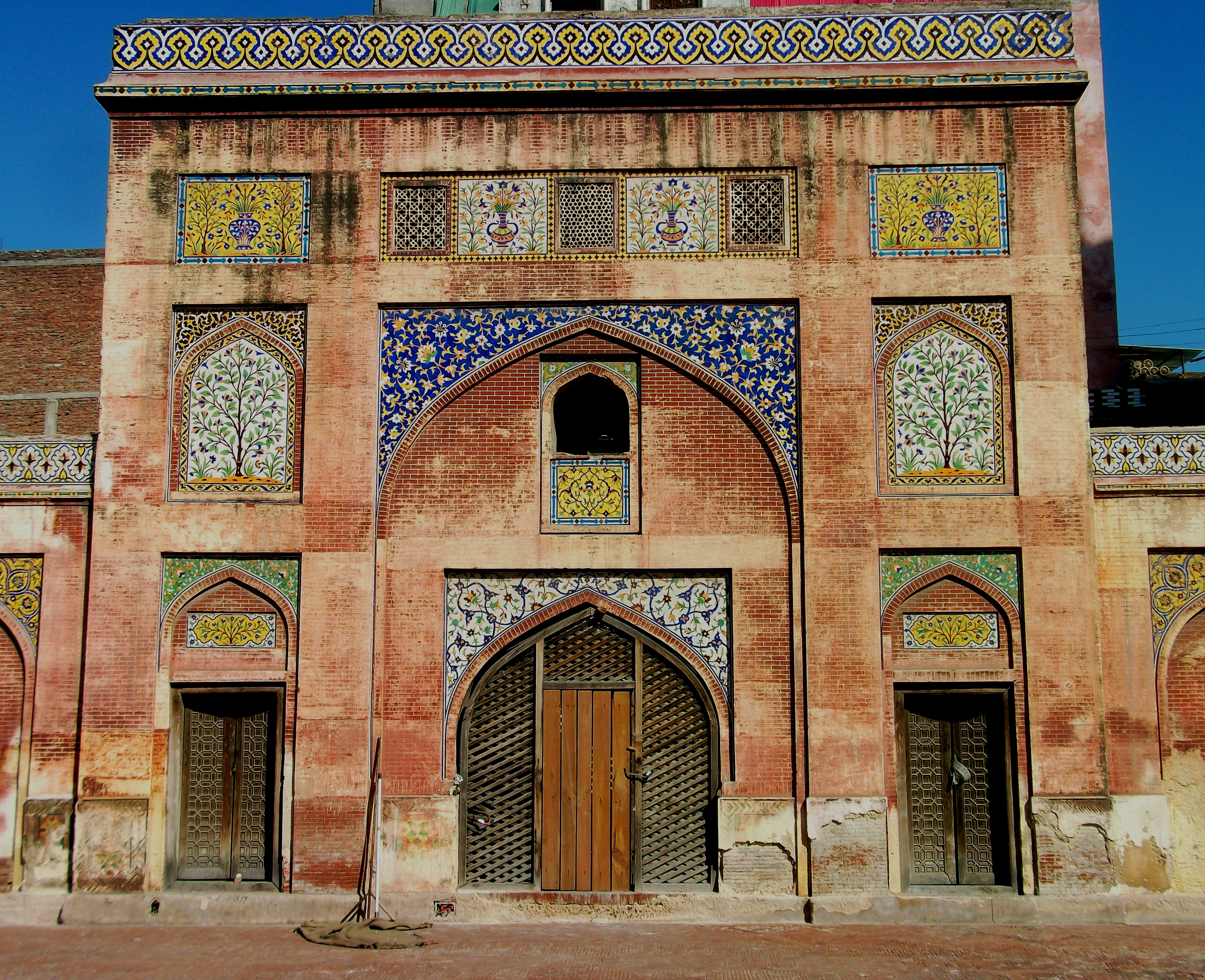

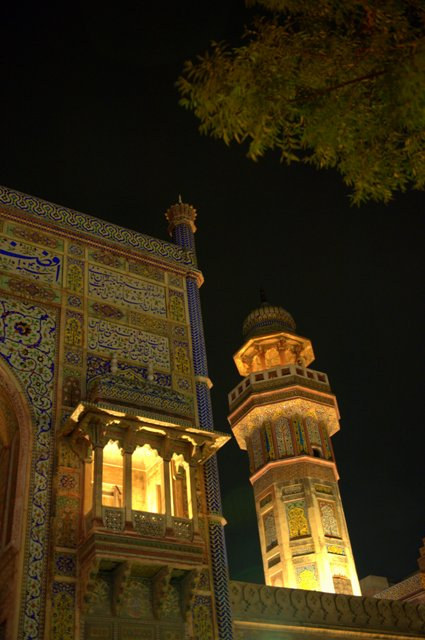
The mosque, illuminated at night.

== See also ==
- List of mosques in Pakistan
- Badshahi Mosque
- Shah Jahan Mosque
- Mosques of Lahore
- Islamic architecture
- Mughal architecture

== Notes ==
- Asher, Catherine Blanshard (24 September 1992). Architecture of Mughal India. Cambridge University Press. ISBN 9780521267281.
- Gharipour, Mohammad (5 March 2015). The City in the Muslim World: Depictions by Western Travel Writers. Routledge. ISBN 9781317548225.
- Wescoat, James L. (1996). Mughal Gardens: Sources, Places, Representations, and Prospects. Dumbarton Oaks. ISBN 9780884022350.
- Haig, Wolseley (1928). The Cambridge History of India. CUP Archive.
- Mumtaz, Kamil Khan (1992). Dar, Saifur Rahman (ed.). "Reading Masjid Wazir Khan". Lahore Museum Bulletin. 5 (2): 55–66. Read online at Scribd and Islamic arts.org,
