= Fred Henry Andrews =

British educator and scholar

Fred Andrews (left) with his wife Nora, Dr Stein and Stein's dog, Dash III. This photograph was taken in Srinagar in 1916.

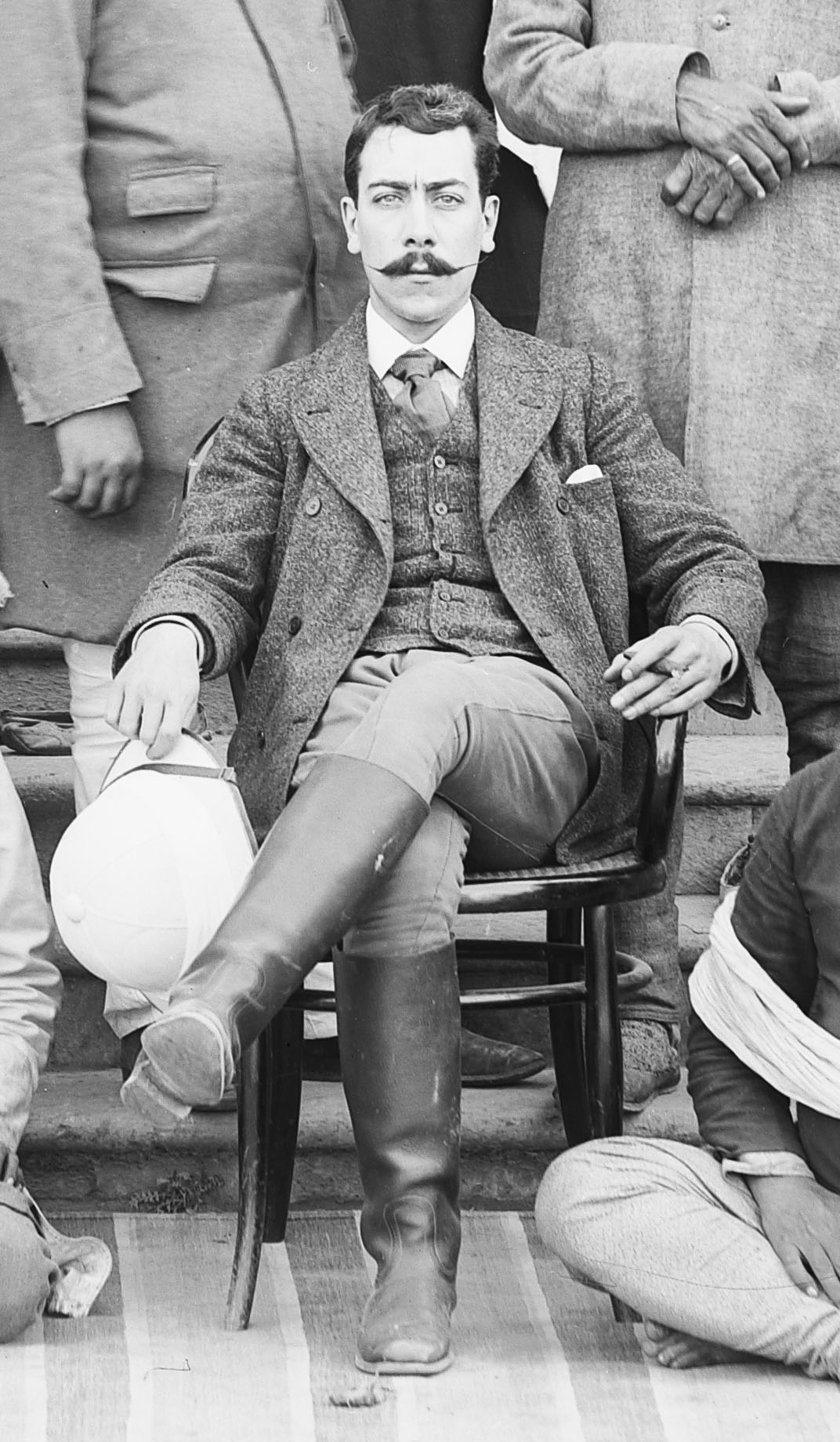
Fred Henry Andrews, Lahore, c. 1900. Photo 392/48(38)

Frederick Henry Andrews (1866–1957) was a British educator and scholar noted especially for his catalogs of the Asiatic artifacts and manuscripts collected by the expeditions of Dr Aurel Stein. In the circle of close friends established at his household in Lahore, he was jocularly known as The Baron.

== Early life and education ==
He was the son of publisher Arliss Andrews. His brother George Arliss became an actor but Fred studied stained glass as his start in the burgeoning Arts and Crafts movement of the late Victorian era. He became an enthusiast for artistic craftsmanship and manufactures of all types and joined the Arts and Crafts Exhibition Society. He also joined the Society for the Protection of Ancient Buildings which had been founded by William Morris and others to protect ancient buildings from insensitive reconstruction. In London, he became the friend of Rudyard Kipling who had similar interests and, in 1890, he started work for Kipling's father, Lockwood, as the vice-principal of the Mayo School of Arts in Lahore.

== Lahore ==
In Lahore, Andrews met Aurel Stein who came to live in the Andrews family home, Mayo Lodge, from 1894. The house was in the Anarkali district of Lahore and had previously been used by B. H. Baden-Powell, the Judge of the Chief Court of the Punjab who wrote The Land Systems of British India. After the Andrews moved on, the house was taken by Percy Allen, the history professor who had also lodged there from 1897. The orientalist Thomas Arnold, who was also teaching in Lahore, became a frequent visitor to Mayo Lodge at this time. The four men and their wives became lifelong friends.

Andrews was a volunteer in the Punjab Light Horse. His enthusiastic accounts of this soldiering caused the Mayo Lodge circle to adopt nicknames as their own nom de guerres. These were suggested by Percy Allen and were:

- Beg General or B.G. — Aurel Stein, as his forceful personality made him the natural leader.
- The Baron — Fred Andrews. His wife was The Baroness.
- Publius — Percy Allen. His wife was Madam.
- The Saint — Thomas Arnold. His wife was The Saintess.

== Srinagar ==
He became the principal of a technical college in Srinagar which was established in 1914 and named after the Maharaja's brother — the Raja Sir Amar Singh. This had been arranged by the indefatigable Dr Stein who had lobbied the Home Secretary, Dr. A.C. Mittra, to establish the college and had likewise persuaded his friend Andrews that life in Kashmir would be more congenial than Battersea. At this new institution, Andrews took great patience to inculcate an ethic of high quality craftsmanship in the Kashmiris who had tended to be slipshod in their work such as carpentry. This earned him the respect and admiration of educationalist Cecil Tyndale-Biscoe, who wrote, "...what Mr Andrews does not know in his line of business is not worth knowing."

A new house was built for them in Srinagar. Following the ethos of the arts and craft movement, Andrews made the thirty thousand roof tiles for this himself.

== Publications ==
- One Hundred Carpet Designs: From Various Parts of India, 1905
- Indian carpets and rugs, 1905
- Ancient Chinese Figured Silks Excavated by Sir Aurel Stein at Ruined Sites of Central Asia, 1920
- The influences of Indian art, 1925
- Descriptive Catalog of Antiquities Recovered by A. Stein, During His Explorations in Central Asia, Kansu and Eastern Iran, 1935
- Sir Aurel Stein: The Man, 1944
- Wall Paintings from Ancient Shrines in Central Asia, 1948
