= Publius =

Publius may refer to:

== Roman name ==
- Publius (praenomen)
- Ancient Romans with the name:
  - Publius Horatius Cocles, Roman officer in the late 6th century BC
  - Publius Valerius Publicola (died 503 BC), Roman consul, co-founder of the Republic
  - Publius Clodius Pulcher (c. 93 BC – 52 BC), Republican politician
  - Publius Cornelius Scipio (died 211 BC), Roman consul
  - Publius Quinctilius Varus (46 BC – 9 AD), Roman general and politician, who commanded the legions in Battle of the Teutoburg Forest
  - Publius Clodius Thrasea Paetus (died 66 AD), senator during Nero's reign
  - Publius Aelius Fortunatus, Roman painter in the 2nd century AD
  - Publius Servilius Casca Longus, better known as Servilius Casca (died 42 BC), Roman tribune and one of the assassins of Julius Caesar
  - Publius Aelius Hadrianus, the Emperor Hadrian (76–138 AD)
  - Publius Cornelius Lentulus Spinther, Roman patrician contemporary with Julius Caesar
  - Publius Cornelius Tacitus (56 AD – after 117), better known as Tacitus, a senator and a historian of the Roman Empire
  - Publius Helvius Pertinax (126–193), better known as Pertinax, Roman Emperor for three months in 193
  - Publius Licinius Egnatius Gallienus (c. 218 – 268), better known as Gallienus, Roman Emperor with his father Valerian from 253 to 260 and alone from 260 to 268
  - Publius Licinius Valerianus (193/195/200 – 260 or 264), better known as Valerian, Roman Emperor from 253 to 259
  - Publius Ovidius Naso (43 BC – 17/18 AD), better known as Ovid, Roman poet
  - Publius Papinius Statius (c. 45 – c. 96 AD), better known as Statius, a Roman poet
  - Publius Rutilius Rufus (158 – after 78 BC), a Roman statesman, orator and historian
  - Publius Salvius Julianus Aemilianus (c. 110 – c. 170), better known as Salvius Julianus, a Roman jurist, public official, and politician
  - Publius Septimius Geta (189–211), a Roman Emperor co-ruling with his father Septimius Severus and his older brother Caracalla from 209 to his death
  - Publius Sulpicius Quirinius (c. 51 BC – 21 AD), also known as Quirinius, a Roman aristocrat
  - Publius Sulpicius Rufus (c. 121 BC – 88 BC), an orator and statesman of the Roman Republic
  - Publius Terentius Afer (195/185–159 BC), better known in English as Terence, was a playwright of the Roman Republic
  - Publius Terentius Varro Atacinus (82 BC – c. 35 BC), better known as Varro Atacinus, a Roman poet
  - Publius Vergilius Maro (70–19 BC), better known as Virgil in English, a Roman poet
  - Publius Ventidius (died After 38 BC), Roman general, protégé of Julius Caesar

== Other uses ==
- Saint Publius (33 – c. 112), first Christian Bishop of Malta and later Bishop of Athens
- Publius, a collective pseudonym used by James Madison, Alexander Hamilton and John Jay in writing The Federalist Papers
- Publius (journal), an academic journal subtitled The Journal of Federalism
- Publius (publishing system), an attempted communication protocol for anonymous and censorship-resistant communication
- Publius Enigma, an Internet phenomenon involving a riddle proposed in connection with the 1994 Pink Floyd album The Division Bell
