= Haveli Dina Nath =

Historic townhouse of Lahore's old city

- حویلی دینا ناتھ
- Interactive map of the Haveli Dina Nath area

General information
- Status: Partially preserved and inhabited
- Type: Historic haveli
- Location: Koocha Baij Nath, near Delhi Gate, Walled City of Lahore, Punjab, Pakistan
- Coordinates: 31.5828°N 74.32464°E
- Construction started: early 19th century

Technical details
- Material: Brick, timber and lime plaster
- Floor count: 2

Other information
- Number of rooms: 19

Haveli Dina Nath is a haveli within the old city of Lahore, near Delhi Gate. It lies adjacent to the Dewan Baij Nath Haveli on its north side, with its entrance accessible via Koocha Baij Nath.

== History ==
Named after Raja Dina Nath, a Hindu finance minister during Ranjit Singh's rule in Punjab, the haveli reflects his legacy. Raja Dina Nath, originally from Kashmir's noble class, was called to Lahore in October 1815 by Dewan Pandit Ganga Ram from Maharaja Ranjit Singh's army. Maharaja Ranjit Singh appointed him as a high-ranking officer, giving him the title of Dewan and control over the area of KalaNor. The British Government later awarded him the title of Raja.

Raja Dina Nath constructed two havelis within Delhi Gate. His second haveli, situated in the southeast chowk of Wazir Khan Mosque, was where he lived with his eldest son, Diwan Narinjan Nath. The well-known Dina Nath well was also located in this area.

== Architecture ==
The haveli displays typical Sikh era characteristics. Its structure, painted yellow, includes a large platform, fountain basins, arches, balconies, carvings, and fresco work. The ceilings are decorated with wooden patterns and mirrors, similar to those in Lahore Fort and the Haveli of Nau Nehal Singh.

The haveli encompasses 47 marlas, featuring nineteen rooms, two basements (sard khana), verandas, and an open backyard. It also has a now-closed underground tunnel. A distinctive feature is the rooftop, adorned with large pigeon cages, a common element in many Lahore homes, traditionally used for pigeon fights and competitions.

Although some parts of the haveli have undergone modifications, its historical elements, such as frescoes (partially covered by whitewash), remain visible. The main hall, believed to have been Raja Dina Nath's court, is currently used as a drawing room. It is surrounded by smaller rooms, now serving various residential purposes, and adorned with traditional crafts and pottery from old Lahore.

The roof features wooden ceilings adorned with intricate tarsembandi designs. The columns, with their ornamental bases and cusped arches, enhance the aesthetic appeal, as does a grand arch constructed with the aid of bamboo stirrups. The courtyard holds remnants of a red sandstone fountain and a cascading water feature.

== See also ==
- Well of Dina Nath
