= Chitta Gate =

Historic city gate in Lahore, Pakistan

Coordinates: 31.583215°N 74.324663°E

- چِٹّا بُوہا (Punjabi) چٹّا دروازه (Urdu)
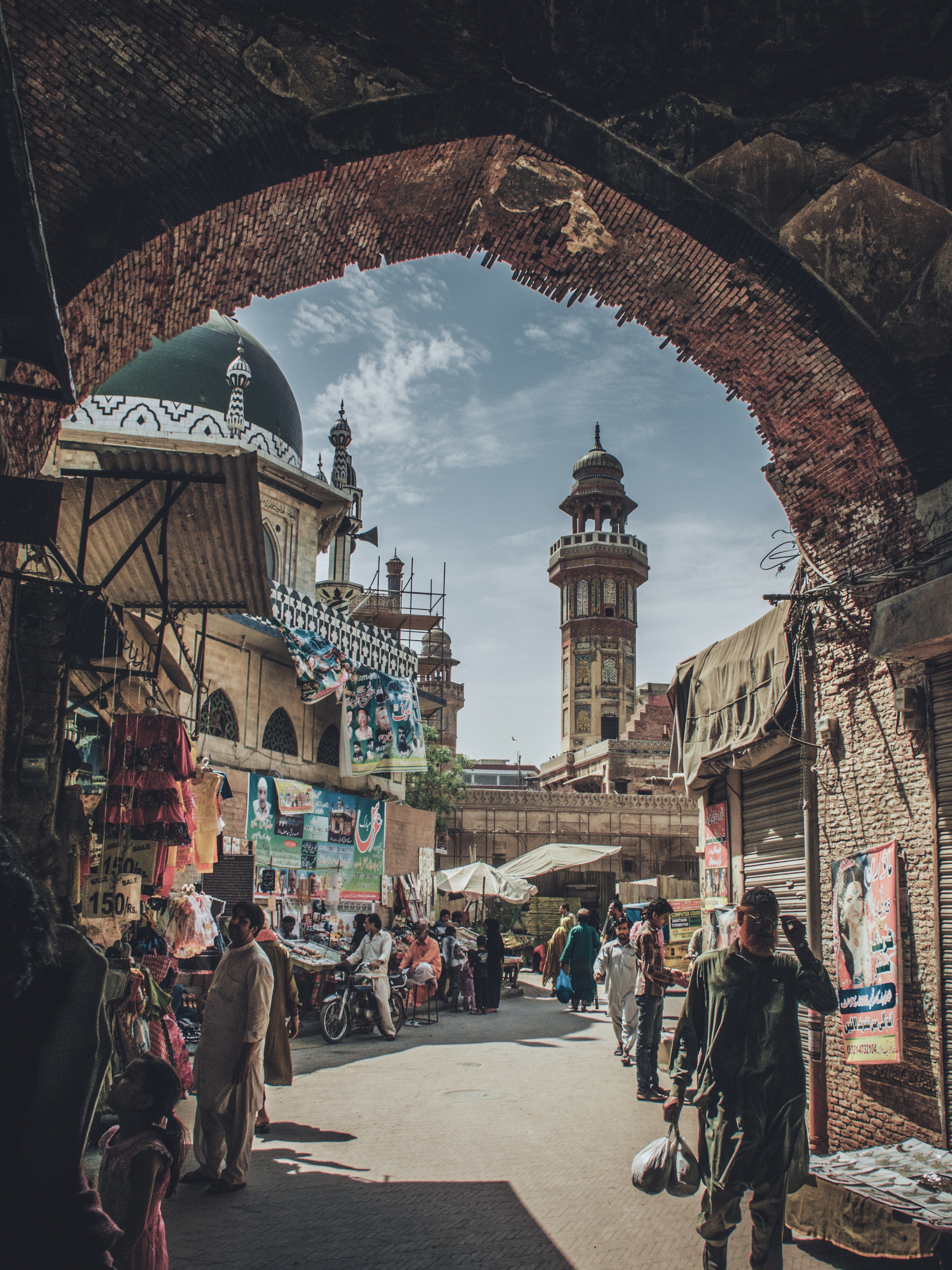
- A view of the Wazir Khan Mosque through the gate
- Interactive map of Chitta Gate
- Location: Lahore, Punjab, Pakistan
- Type: City gate
- Completion date: 1650

The Chitta Gate (Punjabi: چِٹّا بُوہا, romanized: Ciṭṭā Būhā; Urdu: چٹّا دروازه, romanized: Ciṭṭā Darwāzāh; lit. 'White Gate') is a gateway located in the Walled City of Lahore in Lahore, Punjab, Pakistan, dating back to 1650. The gate was once Lahore's original "Delhi Gate," and the city's main entry point.

== Etymology ==
The gate derived its current name from the white lime plaster which once covered its façade.

== Location ==
The gate is on the Shahi Guzargah ("Royal Passage") route that connects the Lahore Fort to the Delhi Gate. The gate opens onto the Wazir Khan Chowk and is situated between the elaborately decorated Wazir Khan Mosque, and the Shahi Hammam. The gateway is adjacent to the Well of Dina Nath, and the shrine of Syed Sūf.

== History ==
The gateway was built in 1650, during the reign of Mughal Emperor Shah Jahan. The gate served as Lahore's original Delhi Gate, but was replaced by the modern Delhi Gate, about 100 metres east of the current gateway. The gate served as the main entry gate to Lahore during the Mughal era.

== Gallery ==
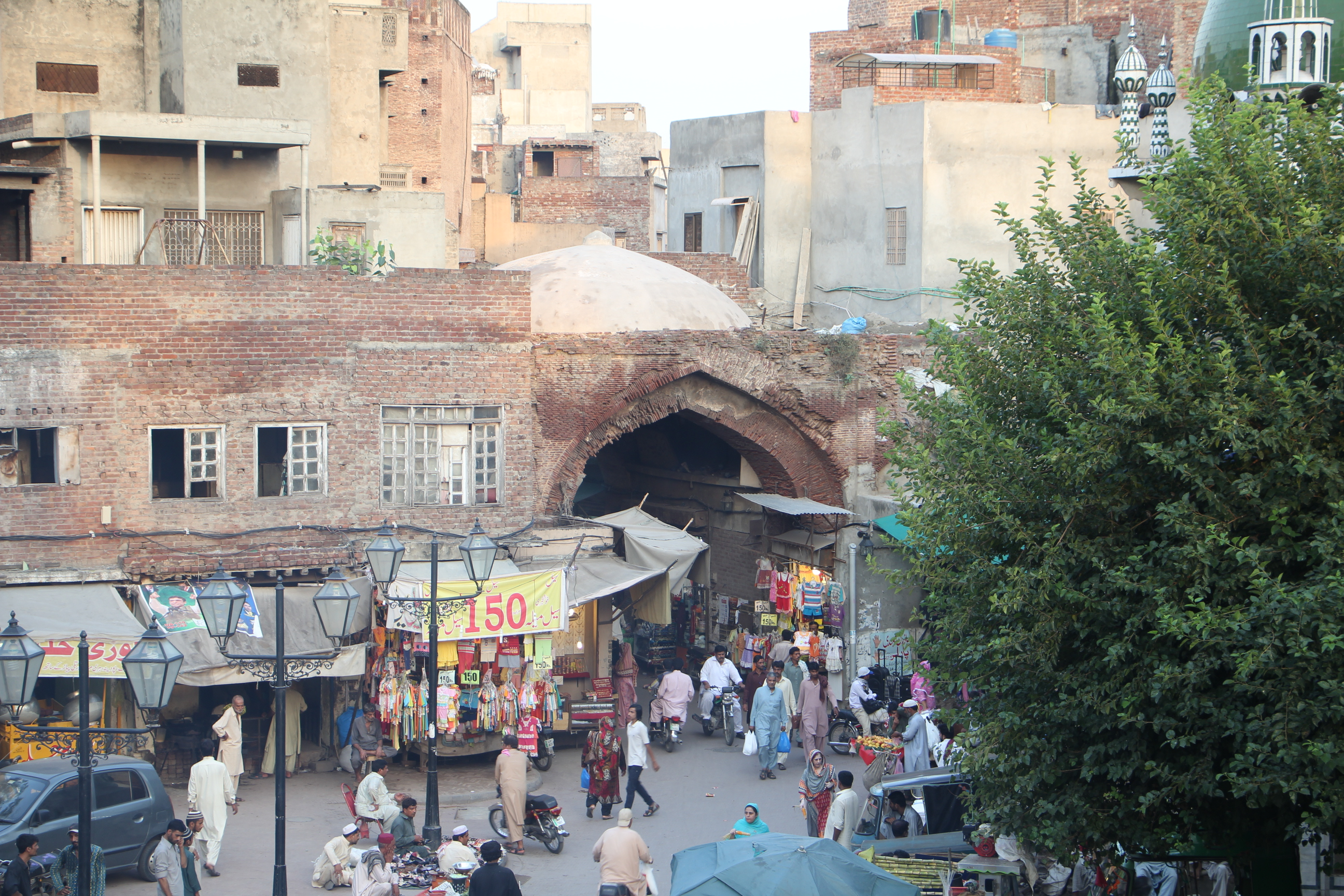
Lahore's Chitta Gate is on the Shahi Guzargah route, and fronts the Wazir Khan Chowk

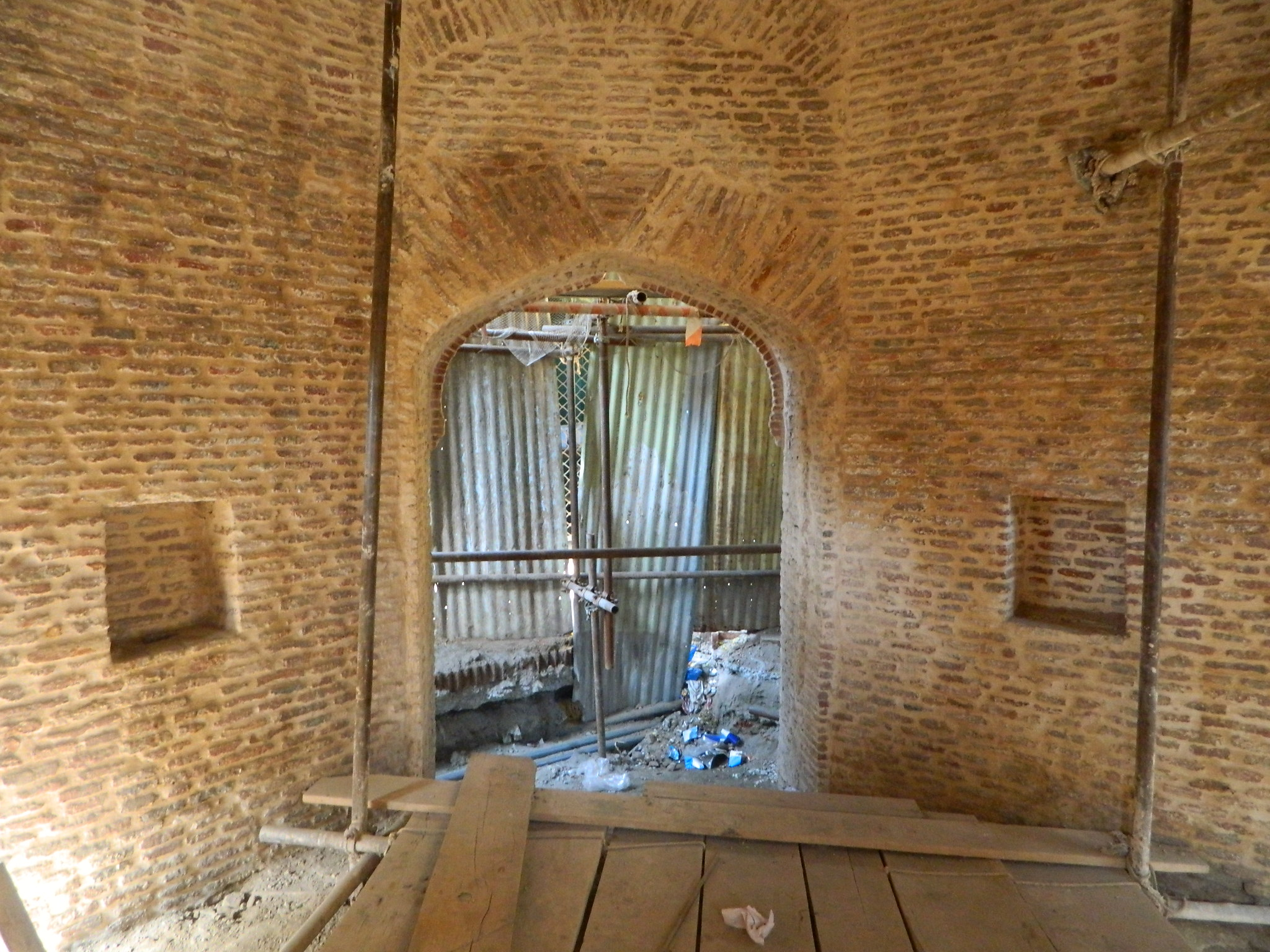
The interior of the gate is formed by a small chamber
