= Wazir Khan Chowk =

Town square in Lahore, Pakistan

Wazir Khan Chowk وزیر خان چوک
- Town square
- Chowk Wazir Khan, Wazir Khan Square
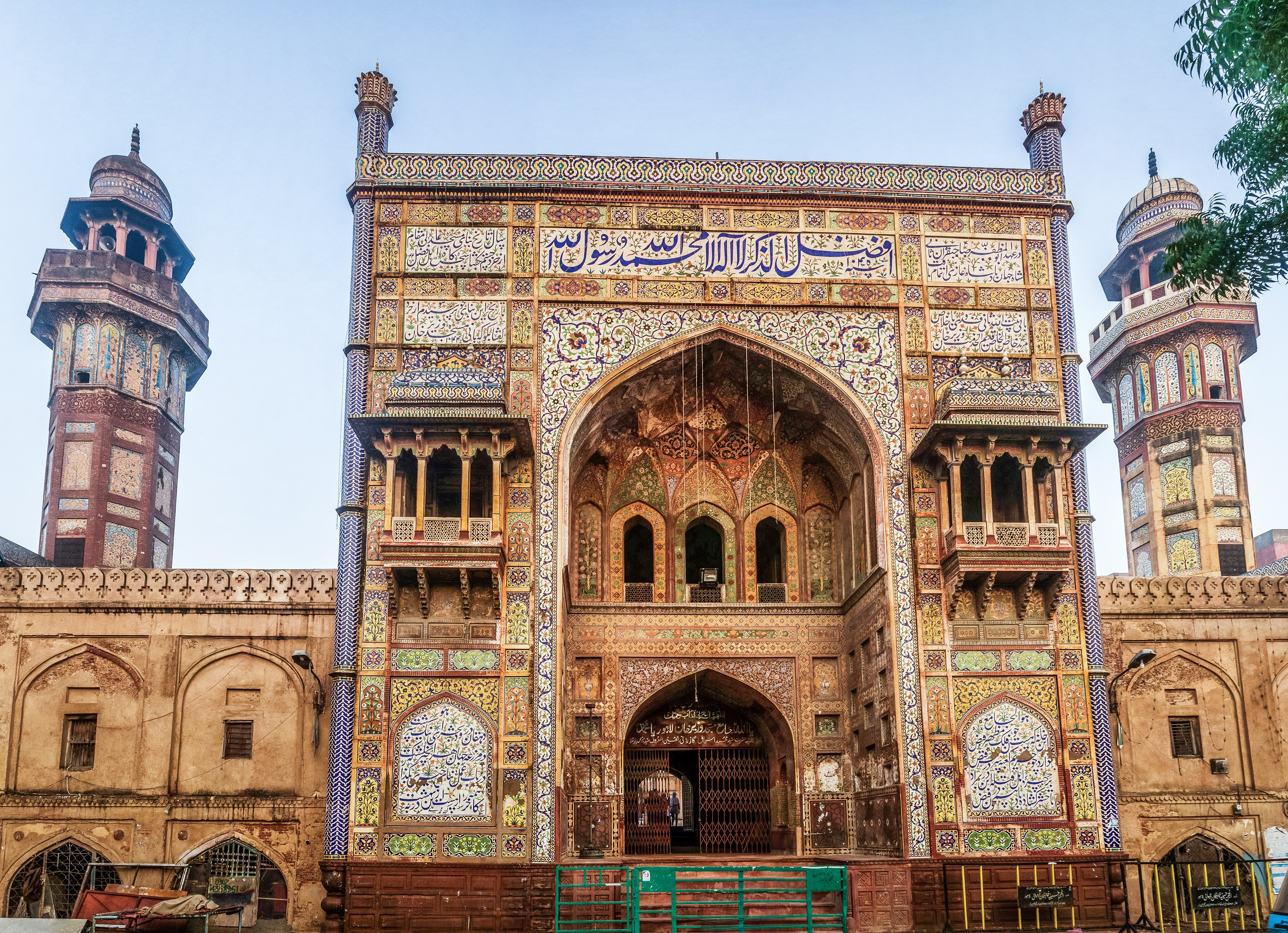
- View of the entryway of the Wazir Khan Mosque from Wazir Khan Chowk
- Surface: Brick
- Location: Walled City of Lahore in front of the Wazir Khan Mosque; Lahore, Pakistan
- Interactive map of Wazir Khan Chowk وزیر خان چوک
- Coordinates: 31°34′59″N 74°19′24″E

The Wazir Khan Chowk (Urdu: وزیر خان چوک) is a town square located in the Walled City of Lahore, in Punjab, Pakistan. It is located at the main entrance of the 17th-century Mughal era Wazir Khan Mosque.

== Location ==
Wazir Khan Chowk is located at the main entrance to the Wazir Khan Mosque, approximately 250 metres (820 ft) west of the Delhi Gate of Lahore. Access to the town square from Delhi Gate is through the smaller Chitta Gate.

== Structures located in the square ==
Wazir Khan Chowk features the tomb of the Sufi saint Said Soaf, and the Well of Dina Nath.

== Restoration ==
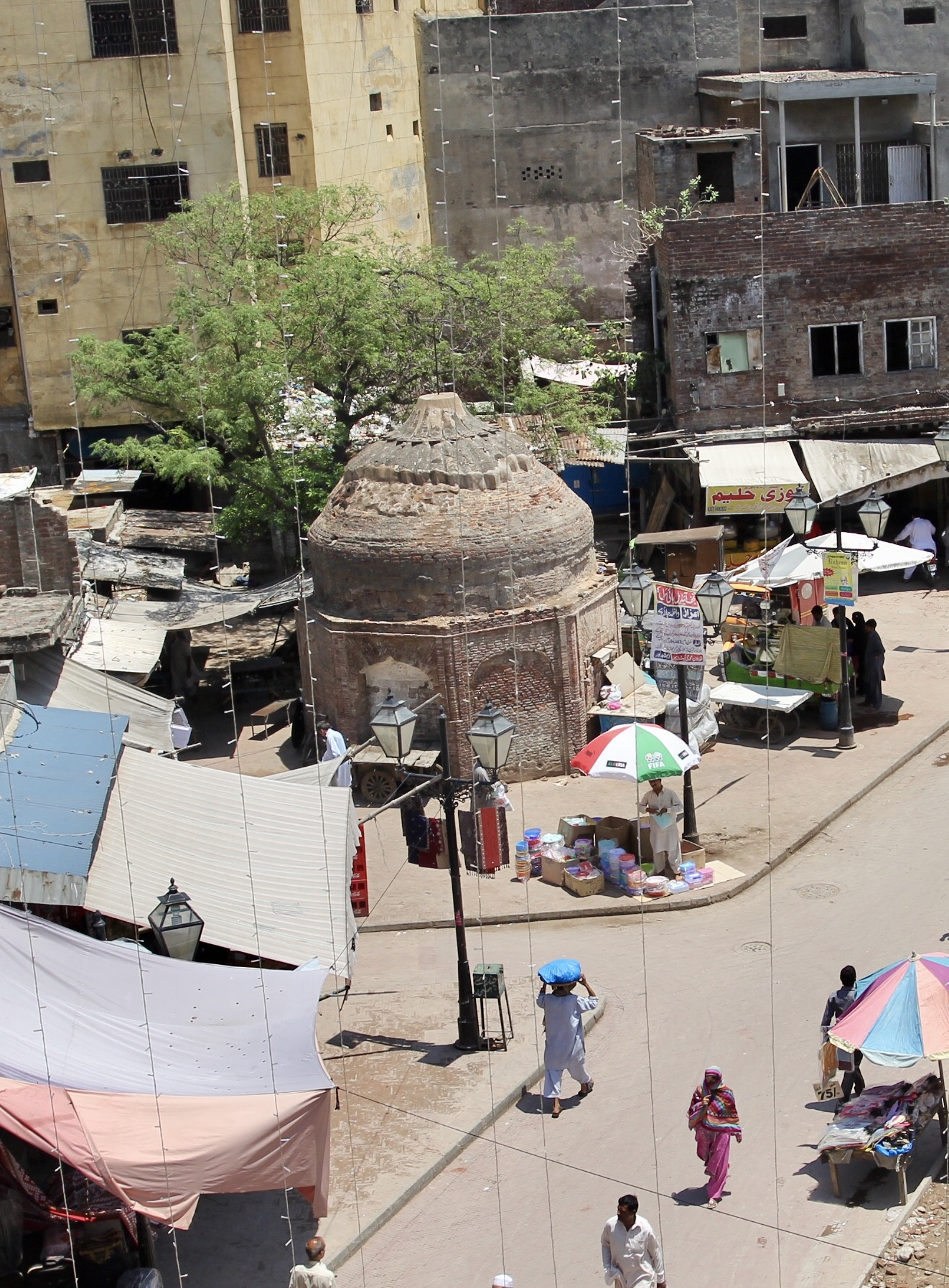
The Well of Dina Nath was restored in partnership with the Aga Khan Trust for Culture.

In 2012, the Pilot Urban Conservation and Infrastructure Improvement Project—the Shahi Guzargah Project was launched by the Government of Punjab, and the Aga Khan Trust for Culture (AKTC) which restored a section of Shahi Guzargah that included the Wazir Khan Chowk.

Prior to completion of the project's first phase, the square had been encroached upon by illegally erected shops which blocked off the view of much of the mosque from the surrounding neighborhood. The first phase of the project removed illegally constructed shops, restoring views of the mosque. Wazir Khan Chowk was extensively rehabilitated by removal of 73 illegally constructed buildings, while the well of Dina Nath was also restored. Electric power lines along the project corridor were also placed underground. The Chitta Gate at the eastern entrance to Wazir Khan Chowk was rehabilitated.

In December 2015, further efforts to restore the site were launched by the AKTC with funding from the Ambassadors Fund for Cultural Preservation - a programme run by the United States Department of State. Under the Rs. 112 (40¢ US) million plan, the town square will be lowered to the original depth found during the Mughal era in order to fully expose the mosque's original façade. Shopkeepers who have occupied hujras, or cells in the mosque designed for religious study, will also be removed, while two historic homes will also be restored.

The project will also include further restoration works to the Dina Nath well and will also include improved outdoor lighting.

The project will restore the square to its original appearance and is expected to require 18 months for completion.

The government of the United States of America has provided $1.1 million of the project's costs, totalling $1.4 million contribution to general rehabilitation of the area since 2002.
