= Diwan Bhawani Das =

Finance minister of the Sikh Empire

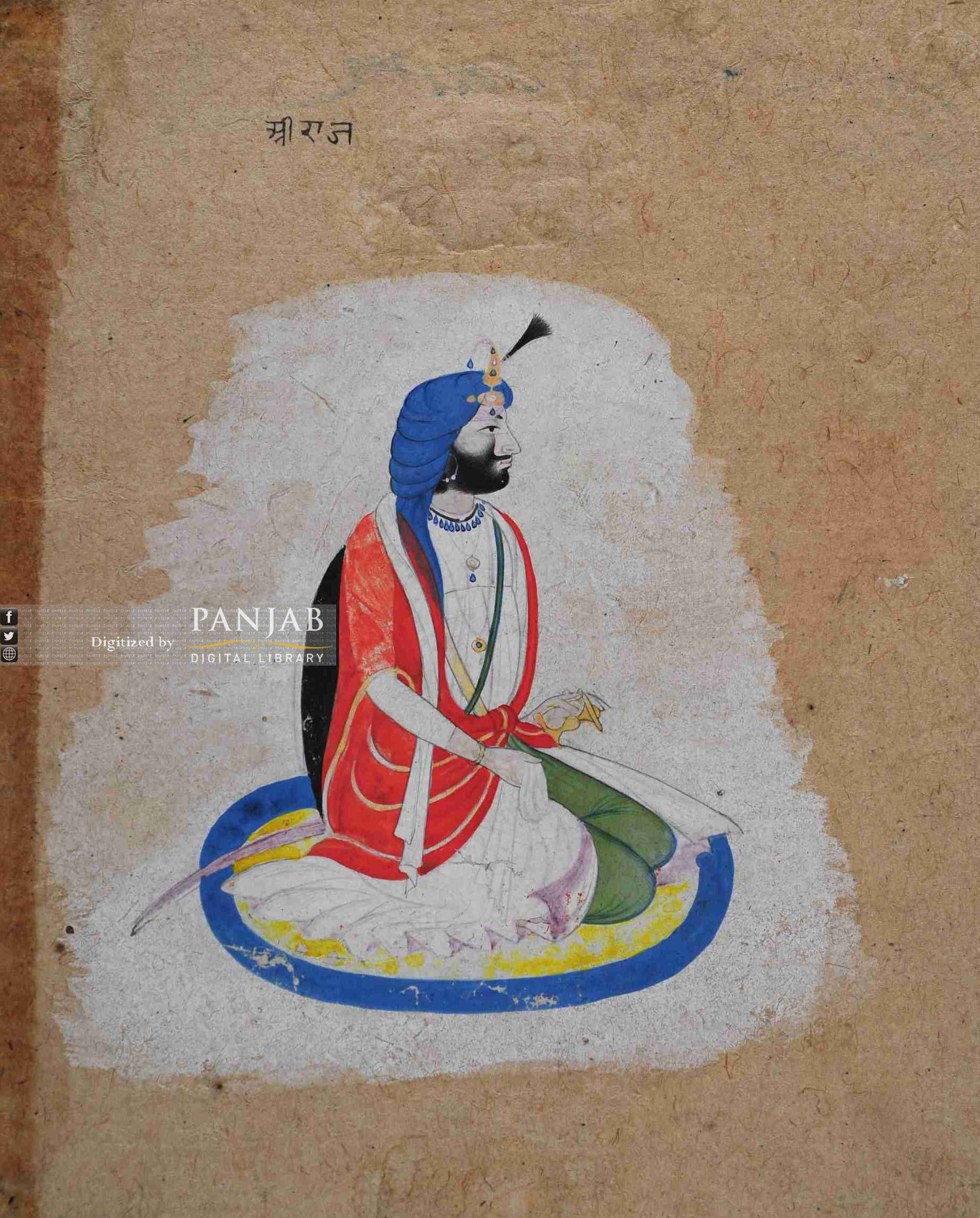
- Painting of Diwan Bhawani Das, ca.1820s

Finance minister of the Sikh Empire
- Reign: 1811-1834
- Predecessor: Position established
- Successor: Diwan Dina Nath
- Born: c. 1770
- Died: 1834
- Father: Diwan Thakur Das
- Religion: Hinduism

Diwan Bhawani Das (c. 1770 - 1834) was a high-ranking Hindu official under Durrani emperors, Zaman Shah and Shah Shujah. He later became the revenue minister of Maharaja Ranjit Singh, ruler of the powerful Sikh Empire.

== Life ==
Bhawani Das was born in 1770 and was the second son of Diwan Thakur Das, the revenue minister of the Durrani emperor, Ahmad Shah Abdali. He was born into a Khatri family. Bhawani Das served as a high-ranking revenue officer under Durrani emperors, Zaman Shah and Shah Shujah, mostly employed in collecting the custom duties of Multan and Derajat.

In 1808, disgusted at the way he was treated at the Kabul court, he went to Lahore to serve under Maharaja Ranjit Singh, ruler of the Sikhs. He was warmly welcomed by Ranjit Singh as the Sikh state was in need of a proper state treasury and system of regular accounts. His employment proved fruitful- Bhawani Das established an office for pay of troops and a finance office, of both of which he was made the head. He set up 12 departments called daftars (offices) to deal with all civil and military accounts. In the districts of different subahs, treasuries were established to maintain regular accounts of income and expenditure. In newly conquered territories, settlement officers were appointed to regulate revenue and finance. His successes impressed Ranjit Singh and he was appointed the finance minister in 1811. However, Bhawani Das was not an honest man, and had to reprimanded on several occasions. Sohan Lal Suri, author of the Umdat-ut-Tawarikh, writes- "His hunchback was full of mischief".

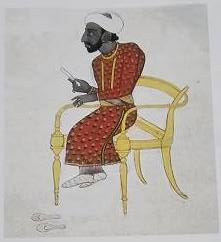
Painting of Diwan Bhawani Das, Chandigarh Museum

Bhawani Das was one of Ranjit Singh's counsellors at the negotiations with the British envoy, Charles T. Metcalfe. In 1810, a huge force under the command of Diwan Bhawani Das was dispatched by the Sikh court at Lahore to crush the rebellion of the popular warrior Mian Dido in the hills of Jammu and capture him. However, he failed in capturing Mian Dido despite trying his best and succeeded in only restoring order in Jammu town and failed to impose his authority in large areas of Jammu hills. In the same year, Bhawani Das was sent to collect tribute from the rulers of Mandi and Suket. In 1813, he invaded and annexed Haripur State in the Kangra hills and accompanied Maharaja Ranjit Singh for the acquisition of the famed Koh-i-Noor diamond from Shah Shujah Durrani. He was made chief diwan of prince Kharak Singh in 1816 and in the same year, he successfully annexed the Ramgarhia estates to the Sikh Empire.

He was also present at the Siege of Multan, where he was bribed by the Nawab of Multan. He also took part in the expeditions to Peshawar and the Yusafzai country. He suffered an eclipse in his career when he quarreled with Misr Beli Ram, the treasurer and second son of Misr Diwan Chand. Misr Beli Ram accused Bhawani Das of embezzlement and Bhawani Das was fined a lakh rupees by Ranjit Singh, and was expelled from the Lahore court to the hills of Kangra. However, his services were too valuable to wasted hence he was recalled and served as finance minister until his death in 1834. He was succeeded by Dina Nath as minister of finance.
