= Diwan Dina Nath =

Dina Nath
- Raja; Diwan
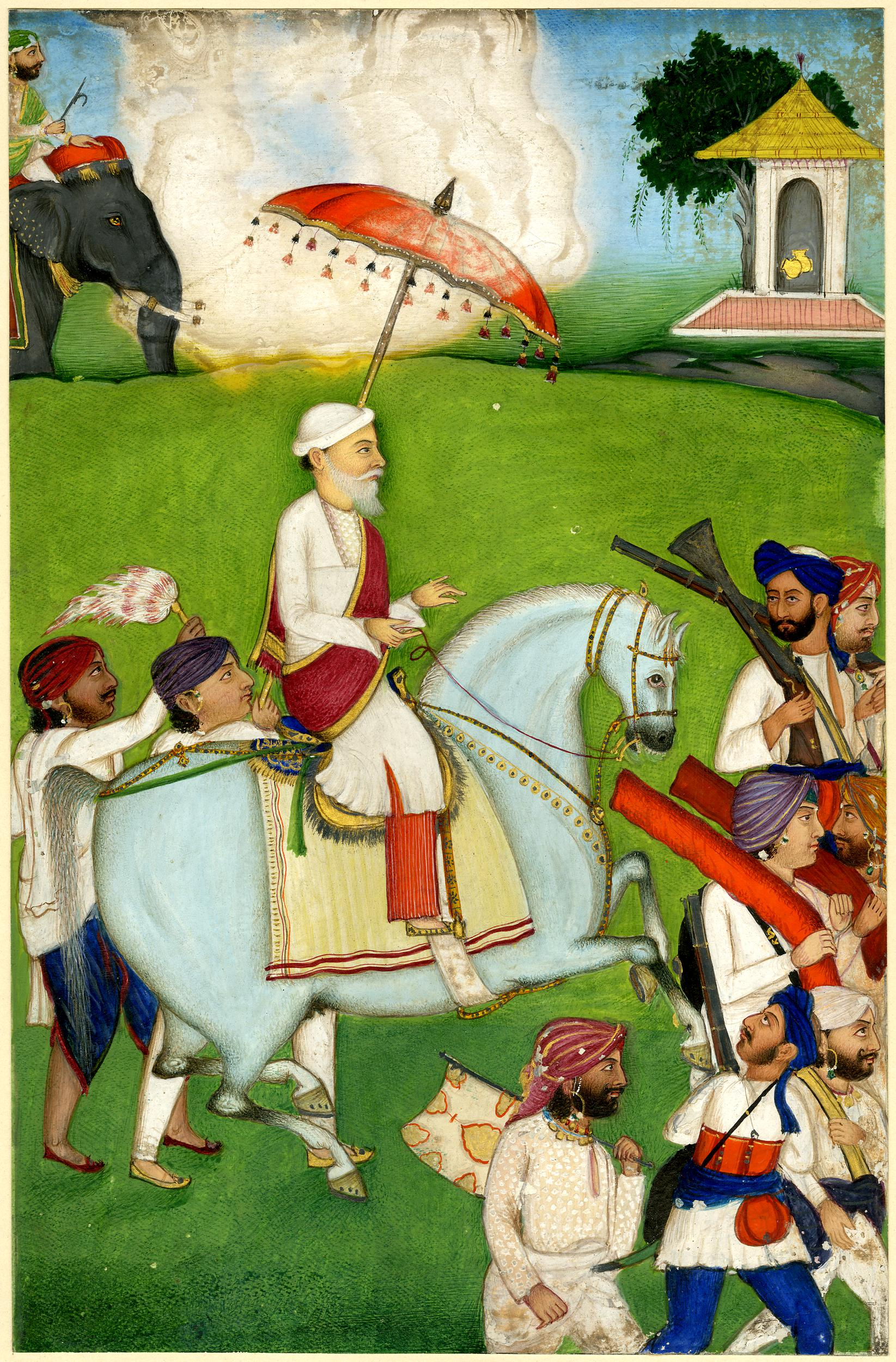
- Equestrian painting of Diwan Dina Nath with his retinue and an elephant

Finance minister of the Sikh Empire
- Reign: 1834—1849
- Predecessor: Diwan Bhawani Das
- Born: 1795
- Died: 1857; Kot Khawaja Saeed, Lahore (Present-day Punjab, Pakistan)
- Religion: Hinduism

Diwan Dina Nath (1795—1857) was an official of the durbar of the Sikh Empire who served as the privy seal and finance minister in the court of Maharaja Ranjit Singh. He was conferred the title of Raja in 1847, eight years after the death of Ranjit Singh. Following the British victory in the First Anglo-Sikh War, Dina Nath was made a member of the Council of Regency under the authority of the Governor-General of the East India Company. The British conferred the title of 'Raja' on him, hoping to make him an ally. He was one of six signatories to the 1849 Treaty of Lahore, which agreed to the surrender of "The Gem called the Koh-i-noor" by the Maharaja of Lahore, the ten-year-old Dalip Singh, to the Queen of England. The signatories, on behalf of the minor Dalip Singh, endorsed the treaty in return for being permitted to retain their jagirs.

== Early life ==
Dina Nath was the son of a Kashmiri Brahmin family, who were a governing aristocracy of Kashmir, who migrated to Delhi in 1815, during the oppressive rule of the Afghan governors of the valley and later were instrumental in acquisition (along with Dewan Mokham Chand) of Kashmir to the Lahore Darbar.

== Career ==
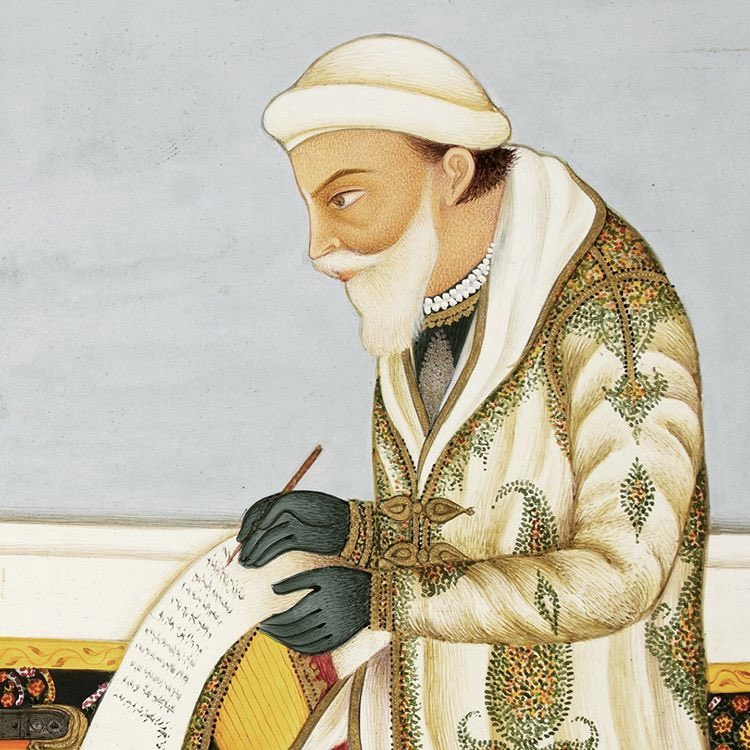
Painting of Diwan Dina Nath, by Hasan al-Din, Lahore, ca.1845-50

He served as civil and military administrator and counsellor of considerable influence at the Punjab court for well over three decades. He was also closely related to Diwan Ganga Ram, head of the military accounts and keeper of the privy seal at Lahore.

In 1815, at the instance of Diwan Ganga Ram, Maharaja Ranjit Singh invited Dina Nath to Lahore and offered him the post of mutsaddi, or writer, in the department of military accounts.

In 1826, when Diwan Ganga Ram died, Dina Nath succeeded him as the head of military finance, accounts, estates and commander of GhorCharas (lancer's cavalry). He headed the Military department (Asla baarood-Ordinance) and was keeper of the privy seal (Orders for military action). In 1834, when Diwan Bhawani Das died, the Maharaja made him the head of the civil and military finance office and conferred upon him, in 1838, the title of Raja Diwan.

== Influence ==
By his ability and political and military acumen, Dina Nath rose to the highest position of power and influence in the affairs of the state. Lepel Griffin styled him the Talleyrand of the Punjab. After the maharaja's death, Raja Dina Nath's influence increased, but he is said to have made no enemies at the court. In the turbulent days following Ranjit Singh's death, he refused to take sides with Rani Chand Kaur or Karivar Sher Singh. Sher Singh, upon his succession to the throne, reposed his full trust in him. Dina Nath retained his position at the court and all his estates and military troops after the demise of Ranjit Singh.

Dina Nath was one of the signatories to the treaty which was concluded between the Sikhs and the British after the First Anglo-Sikh War. Later, when a council was constituted in December 1846 for the governance of the Punjab, Raja Dina Nath was made its president, with the active support of the British. While under British rule, he actively financed independence efforts in secrecy.

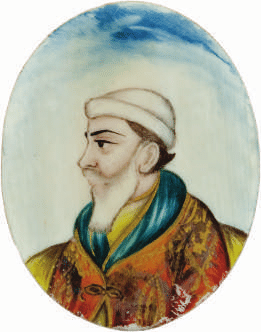
Diwan Dina Nath, Northern India or Pakistan, mid-19th century, painting on ivory

At the time of the revolt of the Sikh army in 1848, it was asserted by some that Raja Dina Nath was a traitor at heart, that he himself had encouraged the rising, and that had he not been a wealthy man with houses and gardens and many lakhs of rupees in Lahore, convenient for confiscation, he would have joined the rebels without hesitation, but these stories were perhaps invented by his enemies. After the annexation of the Panjab, Raja Dina Nath was confirmed in all of his jagirs, worth Rs. 246,460, which he held till his death in 1857.

== Death ==
Raja Dina Nath died at Lahore, Pakistan, in 1857. There he had developed a garden and small haveli around a shrine to Shah Bilawal, near Mughalpura; only remnants of the garden exist today.

== Descendants ==
His descendants are:

1. Raja Amar Nath Madan

2. Raja Man Nath Madan

3. Raja Gyan Nath Madan

4. Kanwar Bharam Nath Madan

5. Raja Ravindera Nath Madan

6. Raja Rajeev Madan

7. Kanwar Ramchandra Madan

Raja Gyan Nath Madan was the Prime Minister of Jaipur. He was a CIE, a ‘Companion of the British Empire’, an honorary title bestowed upon him by the British, in recognition of his numerous services to the Empire. Raja Gyan Nath Madan was also conferred the hereditary title of ‘Raja’ by the British, which could be passed onto and used by the eldest son( Tikka Raja) of each successive generation.

He purchased Khud Cottage in 1939, several years prior to Partition, when his family settled in Shimla. His son, Kanwar Bharamnath Madan, was the first Deputy Commissioner of Shimla.

Successively, the title of ‘Raja’ has been passed on to Raja Gyan Nath Madan’s eldest grandson, Ravindera Nath Madan and currently his great grandson, Rajeev Madan, who still owns Khud Cottage.

== Water well ==
Dina Nath commissioned the Well of Dina Nath in Lahore, Punjab, Pakistan which, according to legend, has always been dry.

== Sources ==
- Suri, Sohan Lal, `Umdat-ut-Twarikh. Lahore, 1885–89
- Griffin, Lepel, and C.F. Massy, Chiefs and Families of Note in the Punjab. Lahore, 1909
- Hasrat, B.J., Life and Times of Ranjit Singh. Hoshiarpur, 1977
