= Well of Dina Nath =

Well of Dina Nath دِینا ناتھ دا کُھوہ دینا ناتھ کا کنواں
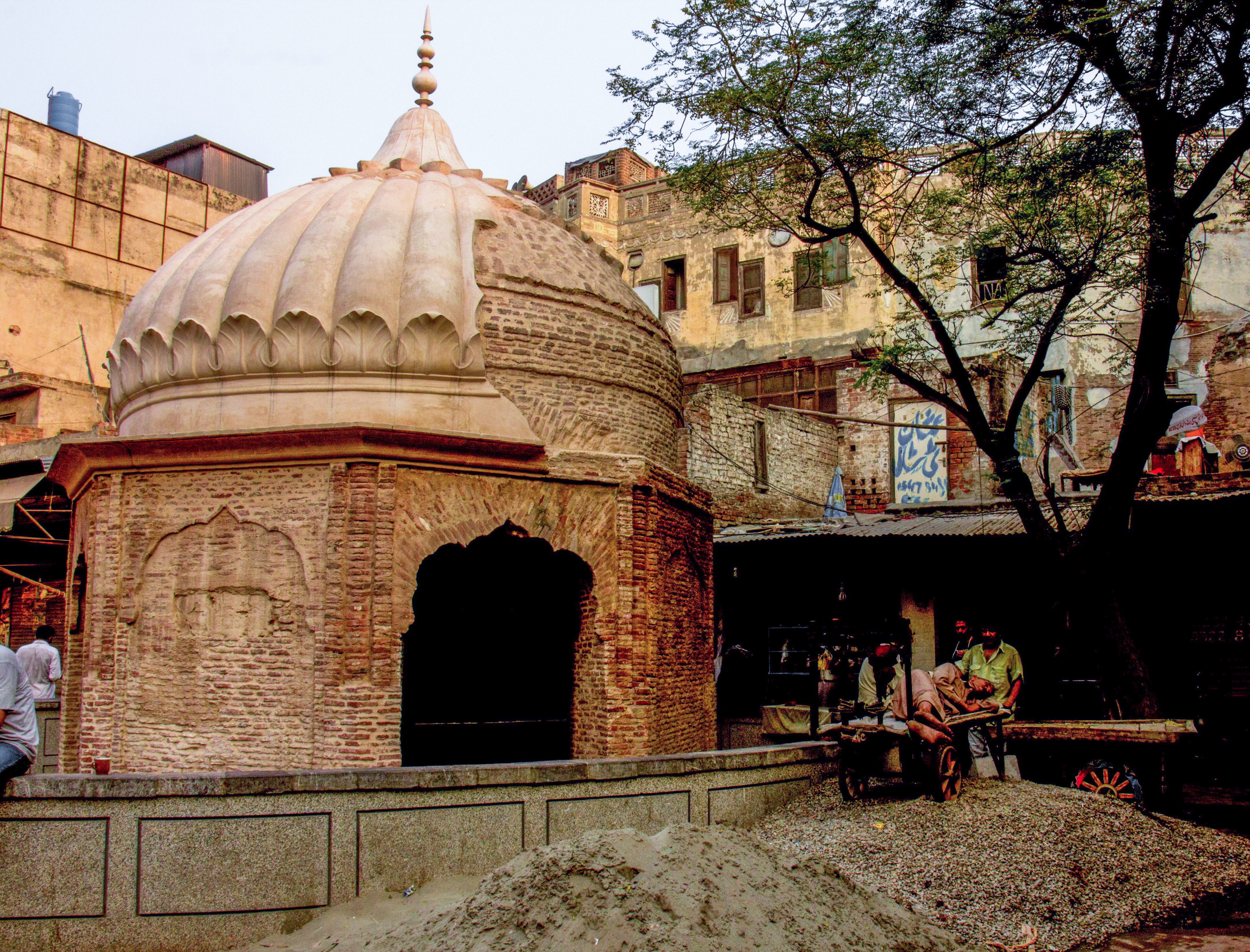
- The Well of Dina Nath
- Interactive map of the Well of Dina Nath دِینا ناتھ دا کُھوہ دینا ناتھ کا کنواں area

General information
- Status: Intact
- Type: Intended to have been a water well
- Location: Lahore, Punjab Pakistan
- Coordinates: 31°34′59.7″N 74°19′27.6″E
- Completed: Mid 19th century

Technical details
- Material: Brick

The Well of Dina Nath (Punjabi: دِینا ناتھ دا کُھوہ , Urdu: دینا ناتھ کا کنواں) was intended to be a water well in the Wazir Khan Chowk in Lahore, Punjab, Pakistan. The well's construction in the 19th century by a Sikh nobleman sparked controversy, given its location in the immediate vicinity of the Wazir Khan Mosque.

== History ==
The well was commissioned by Raja Dina Nath in the mid-19th century during the reign of Ranjit Singh. The well was not built as an open well, but is instead enclosed within a walled structure.

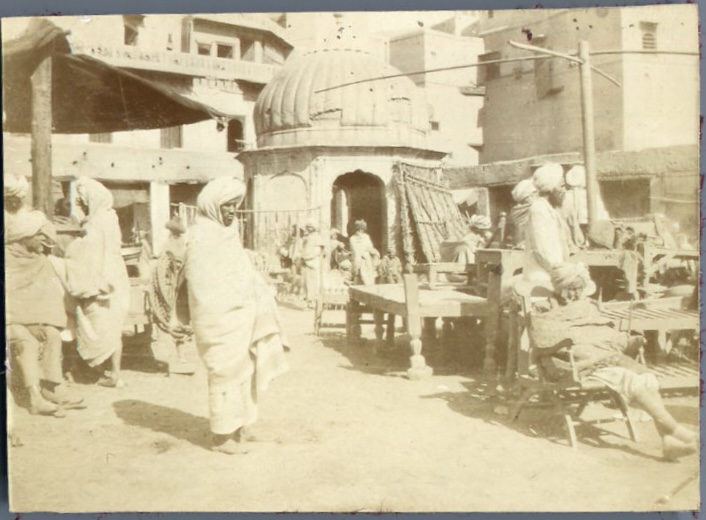
The Well of Dina Nath at Wazir Khan Chowk, Lahore, c. 1880s–1900s

It is said that Nath wished to build his well near the site of a well dug by Sufi saint Said Soaf despite strong objections from local Muslim leaders who viewed construction of a second well to be antagonistic to the saint's memory. Disregarding their warnings and objections, Dina Nath ordered construction to begin on the site. After 200 metres of digging, labourers could not tap a water source, and refused to dig any further, much to the embarrassment of Dina Nath. The well has remained dry ever since, and remains a local monument.

== Restoration ==
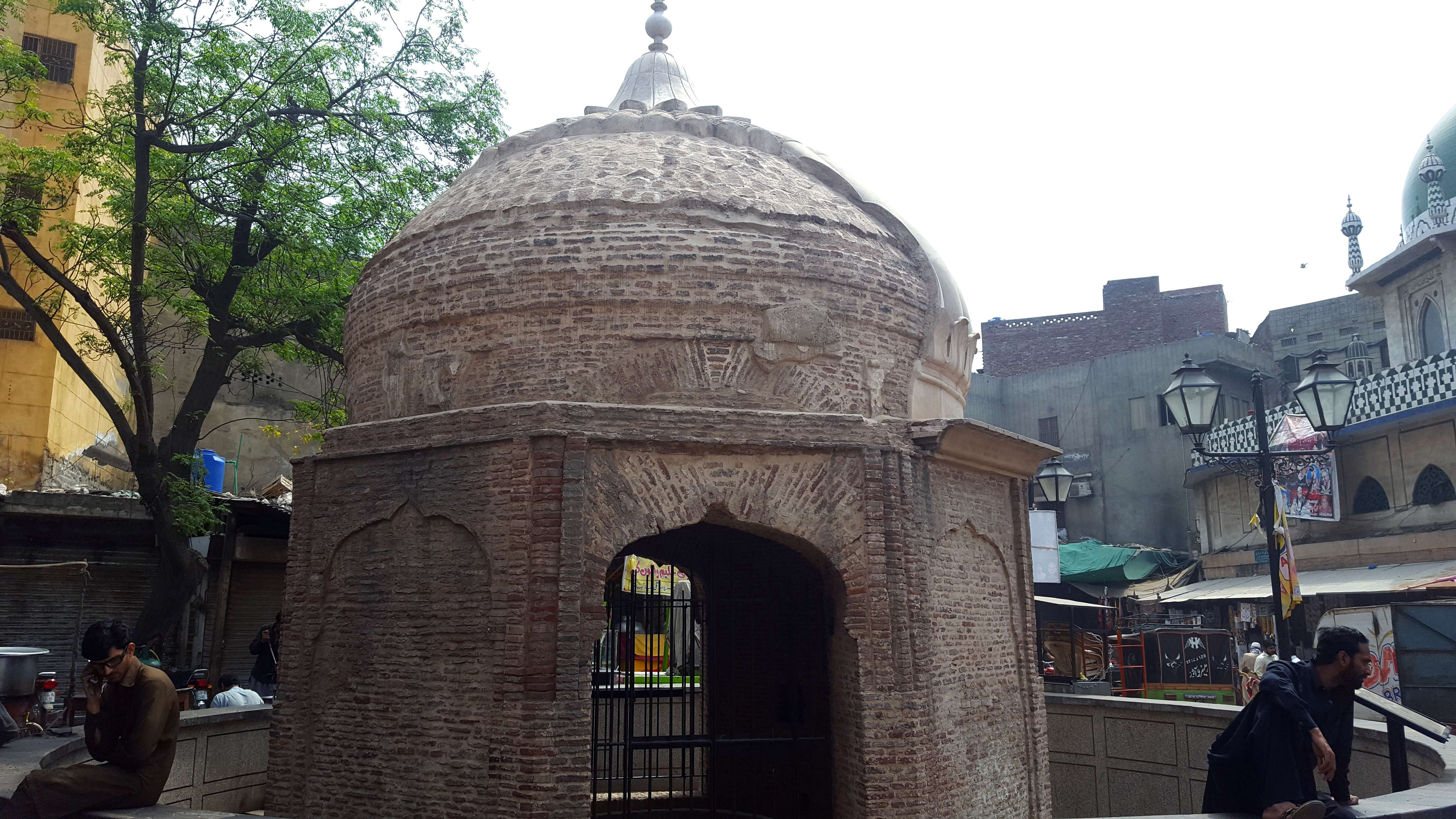
Well of Dina Nath, 2018

The well fell into disrepair, and was eventually surrounded by illegally constructed shops which had encroached upon the Wazir Khan Chowk. In 2012, the Aga Khan Trust for Culture and the Government of Punjab launched restoration efforts which have since removed the illegal shops, restoring public access to the well.

== See also ==
- Haveli Dina Nath
