= Delhi Gate, Lahore =

Historic gate in Lahore, Pakistan

Delhi Gate
- دِلّی بُوہا (Punjabi) دہلی دروازه (Urdu)
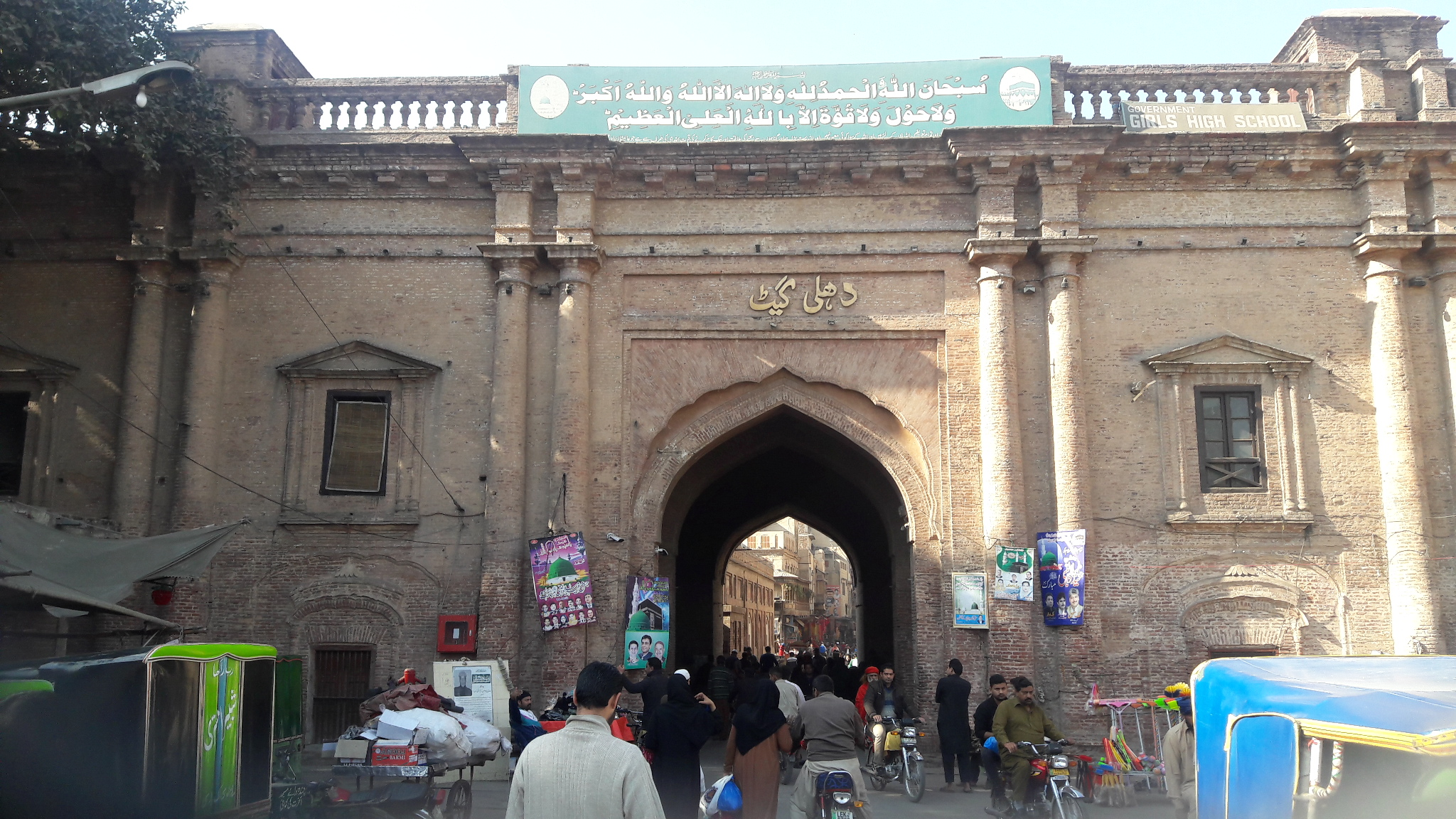
- Lahore's Delhi Gate faces eastward in the direction of Delhi, India
- Interactive map of Delhi Gate
- Location: Lahore, Punjab, Pakistan
- Coordinates: 31.5822°N 74.3264°E
- Type: City gate

Delhi Gate (Punjabi: دِلّی بُوہا, romanized: Dillī Būhā; Urdu: دہلی دروازه, romanized: Dēhlī Darwāzā) is one of the six remaining historic gates of the Walled City of Lahore in Lahore, Punjab, Pakistan. Delhi Gate and the adjacent Shahi Hammam were restored in 2015 by the Aga Khan Cultural Service Pakistan.

== Background ==
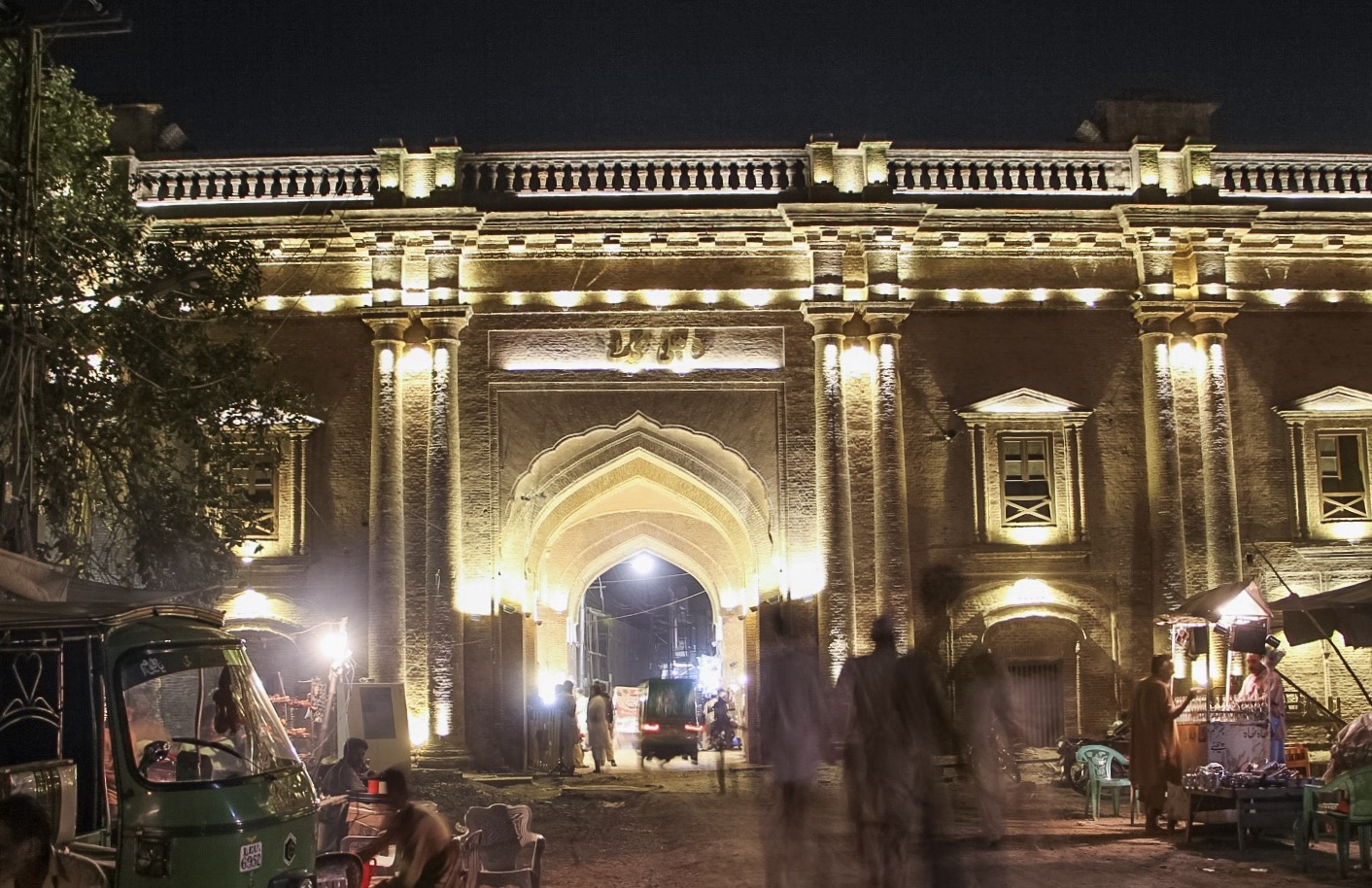
Delhi Gate has been restored and is now illuminated at night.

The Delhi Gate was originally built during the Mughal era, and is now known as the Chitta Gate, about 100 metres west of the new Delhi Gate. The gate was named after Delhi since the gate opened east, in the general direction of that city. During the Mughal era, the gate served as the main gateway to Lahore, and its doors were shut every evening. The surrounding area includes several buildings of historical significance including the 17th-century Wazir Khan Mosque, Shahi Hammam, and havelis. "The original 13 gates around the city of Lahore were built by the third Mughal emperor Akbar in the mid-1600s. These thirteen gates provided access to the city of Lahore which was once enclosed within a thirty feet high fortified wall, built by the same Mughal emperor". Delhi Gate also served as Union Council 27 (UC 27) in Tehsil Ravi of Lahore City District.

== History ==
The gate was once part of Lahore's city walls, which were torn down by the British after the Sepoy Mutiny of 1857. The gate itself was also destroyed by the British, but was reconstructed in the 19th century under the British Raj. Following the Partition of British India, the gate housed a girls' school. The gate is mentioned by Rudyard Kipling in his 1891 short story "The City of Dreadful Night." Lahore's famous Zamzama Gun was originally placed at Delhi Gate, but was later relocated by the British to its present site in front of the Lahore Museum.

== Structure ==
The gate is a two-story structure with space for ten to twelve shops. The gate's rooftop can be accessed by a staircase. The gate opens up into a Bazaar heading to the Wazir Khan Mosque and further leading to Shah Alam Market and Suha Bazaar. The famous spice market Akbari Mandi is also located next to Delhi Gate.

== Restoration ==
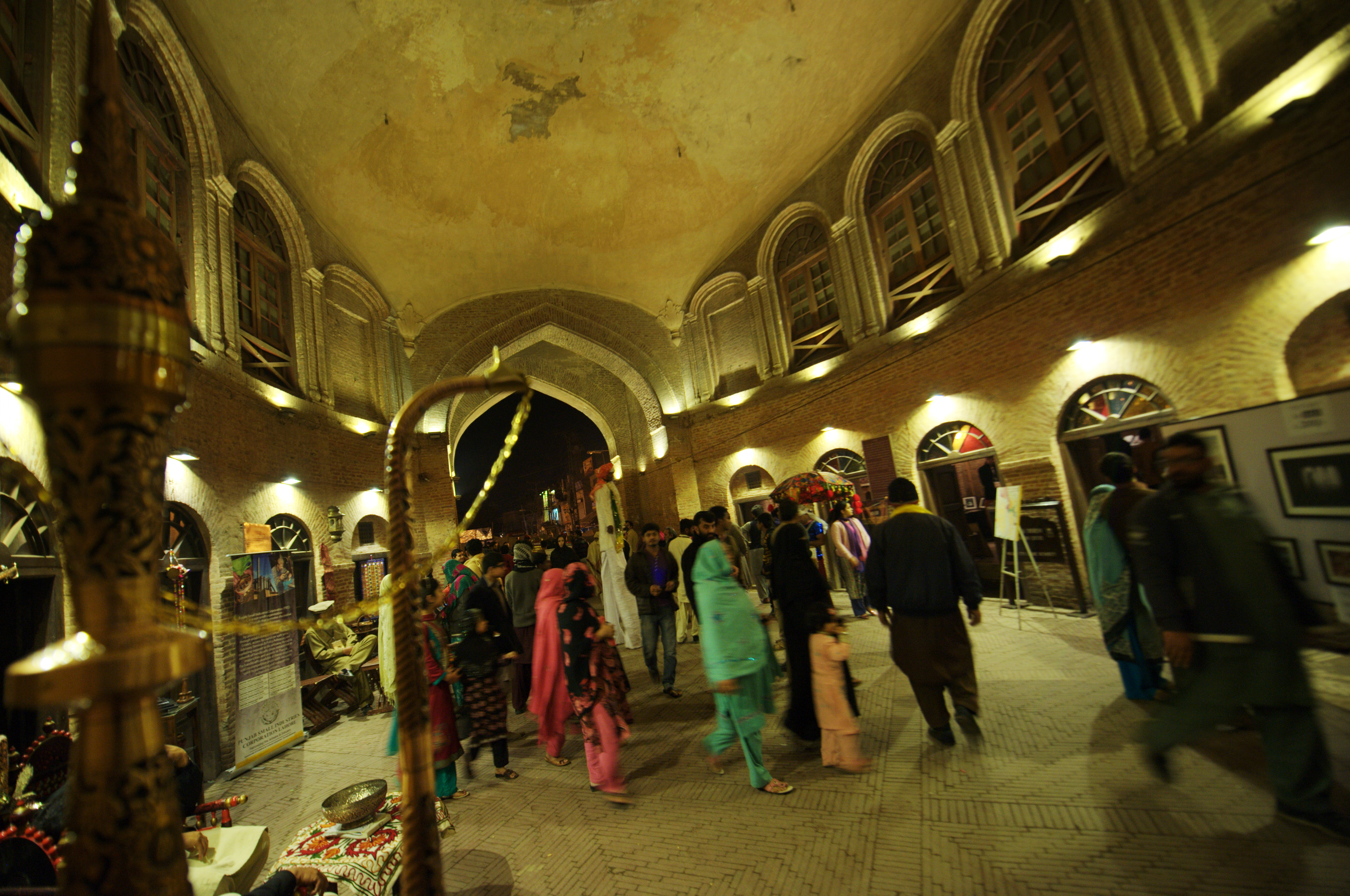
The gate has been restored and features a small market inside the builditural Service Pakistan (AKCSP)

undertook a project to renovate the gate that was funded by the government of Norway. Goals of the project were to conserve not only the gate, but also the nearby 17th century Wazir Khan Mosque, as well as the adjacent Shahi Hammam.

== Gallery ==
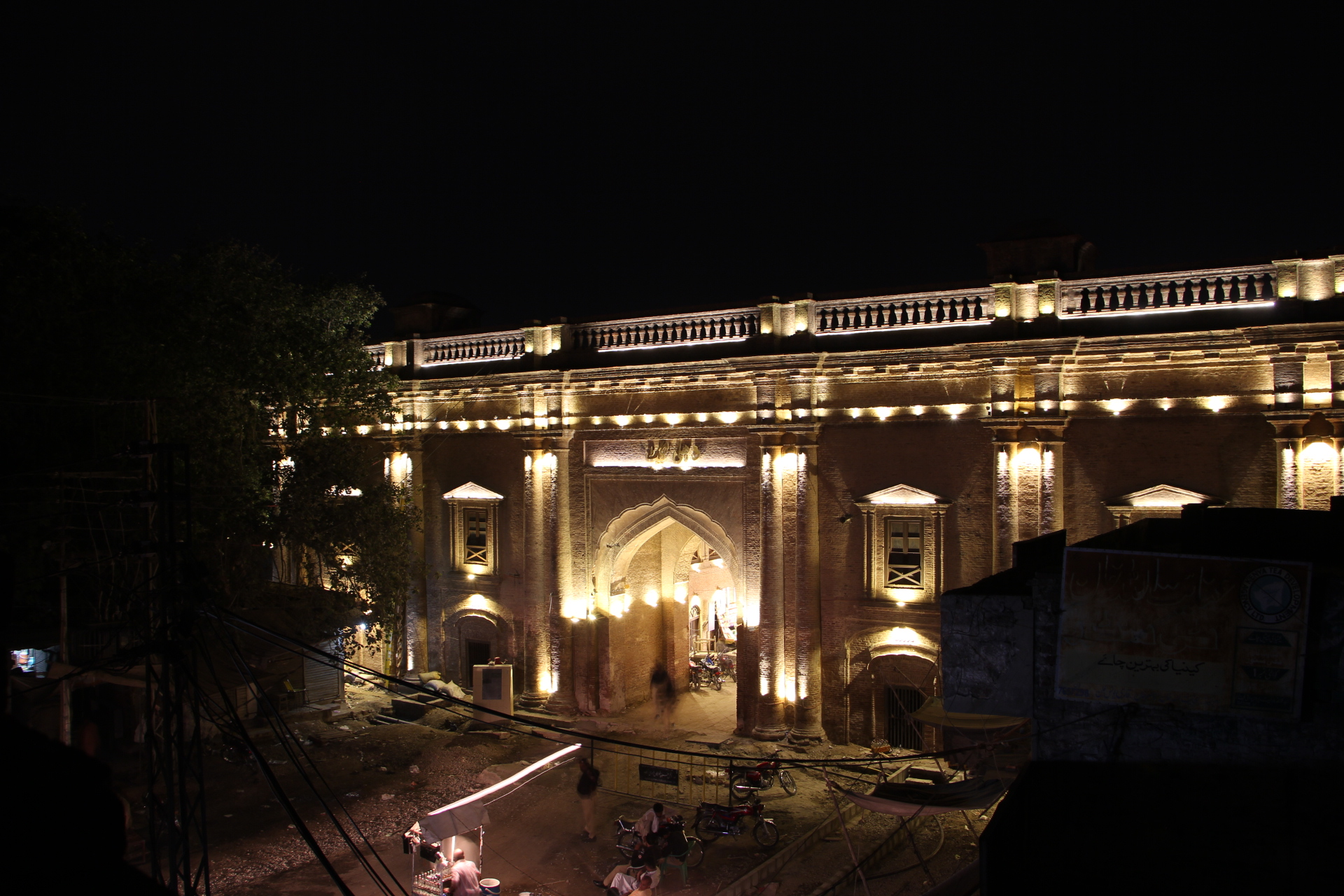
The gate is now illuminated by accent lighting following restoration.

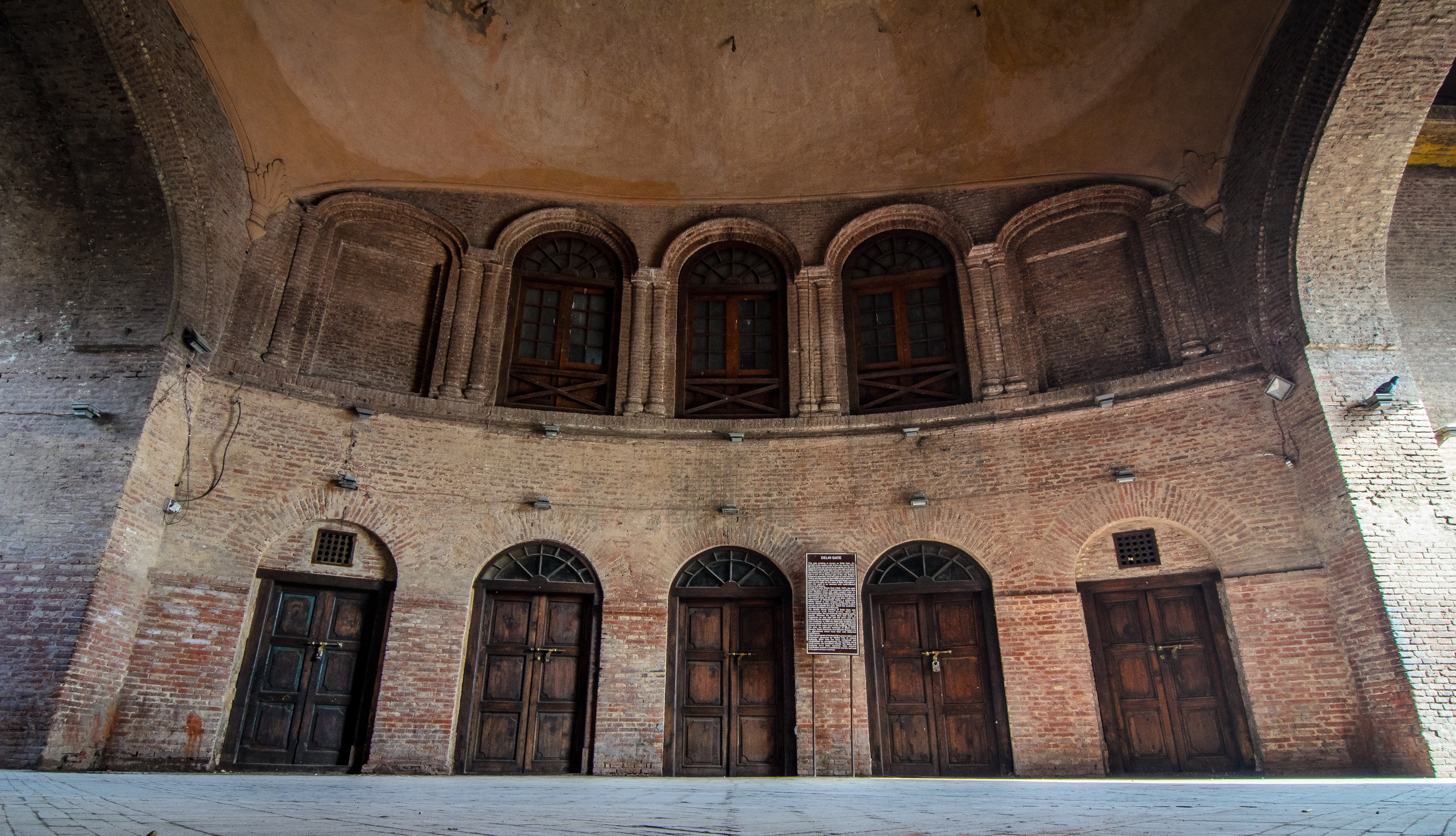
The gate's interior features several cells which are used as shops.

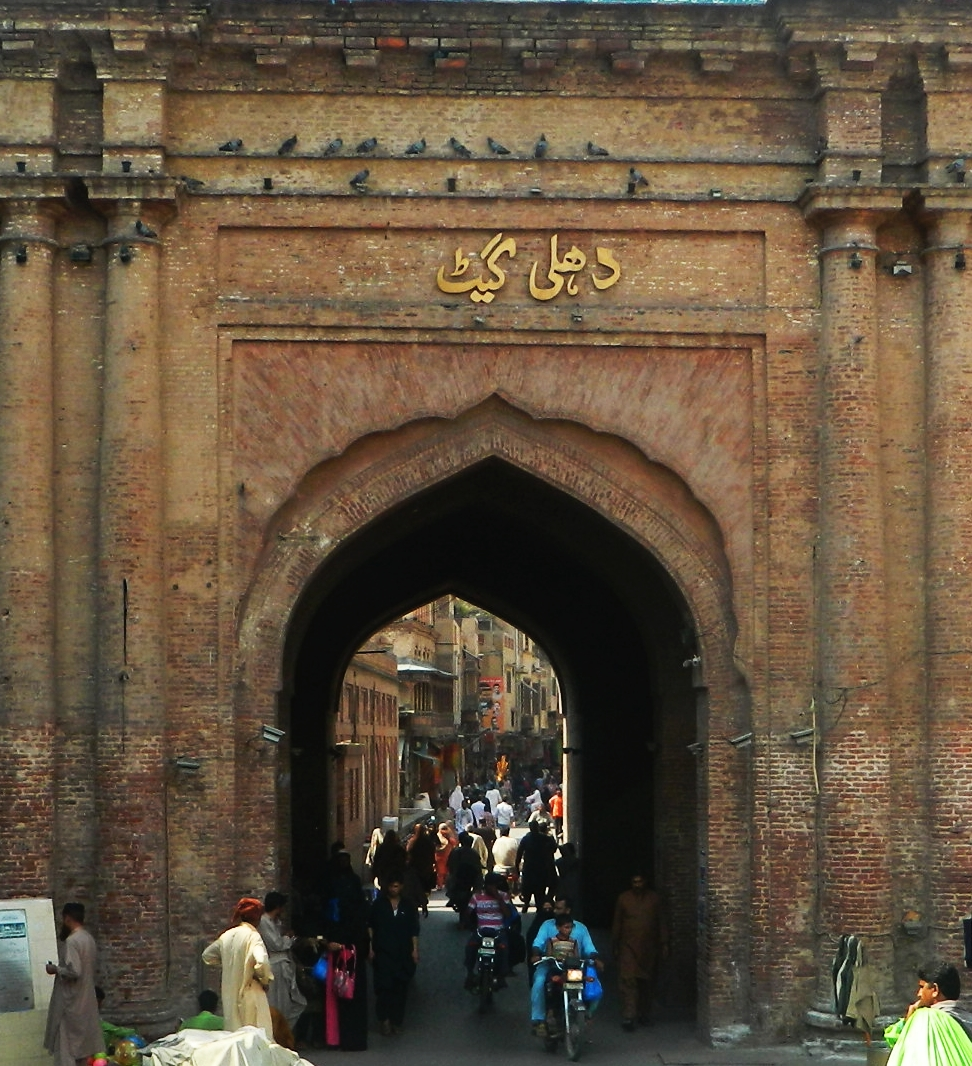

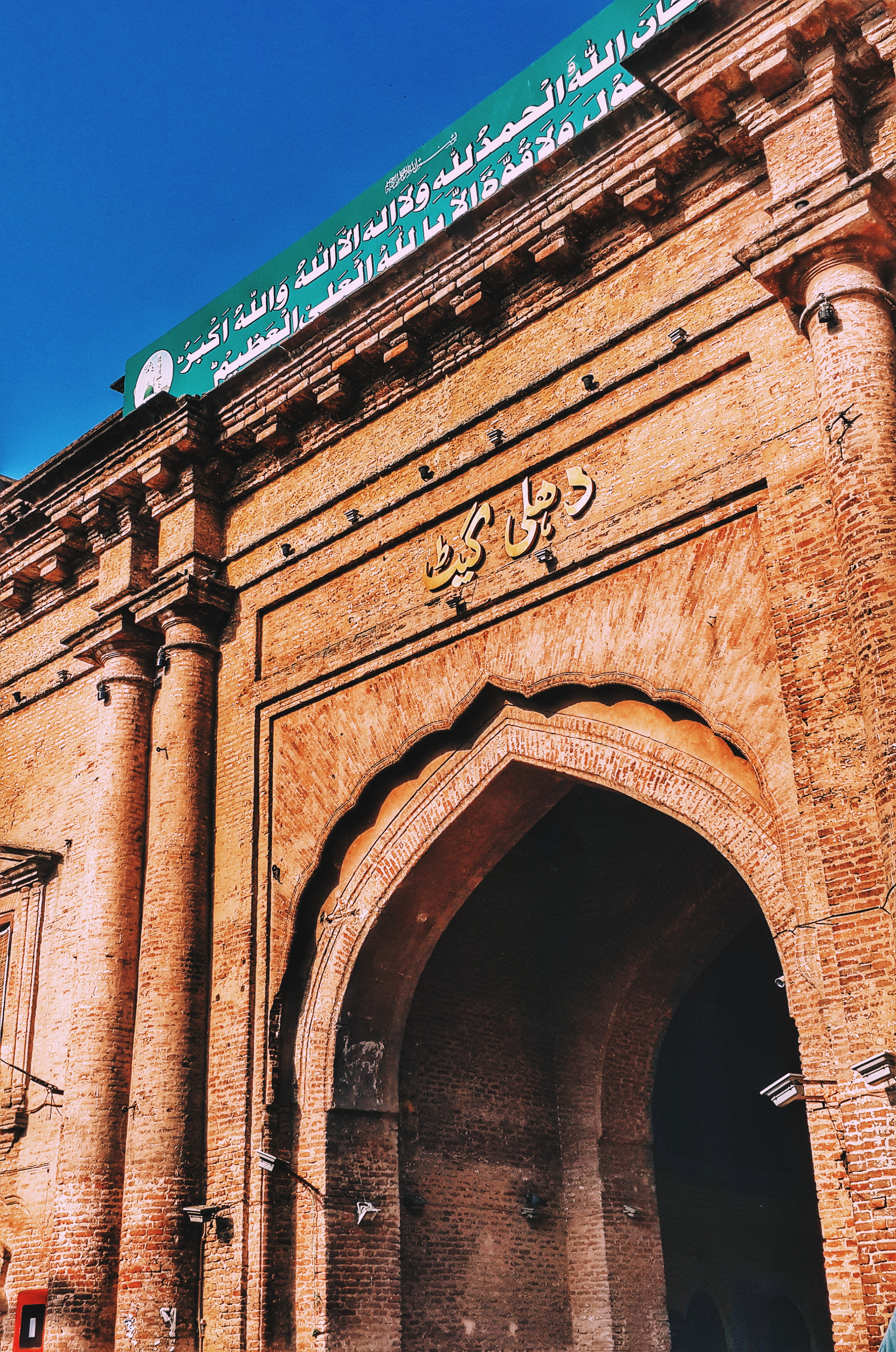

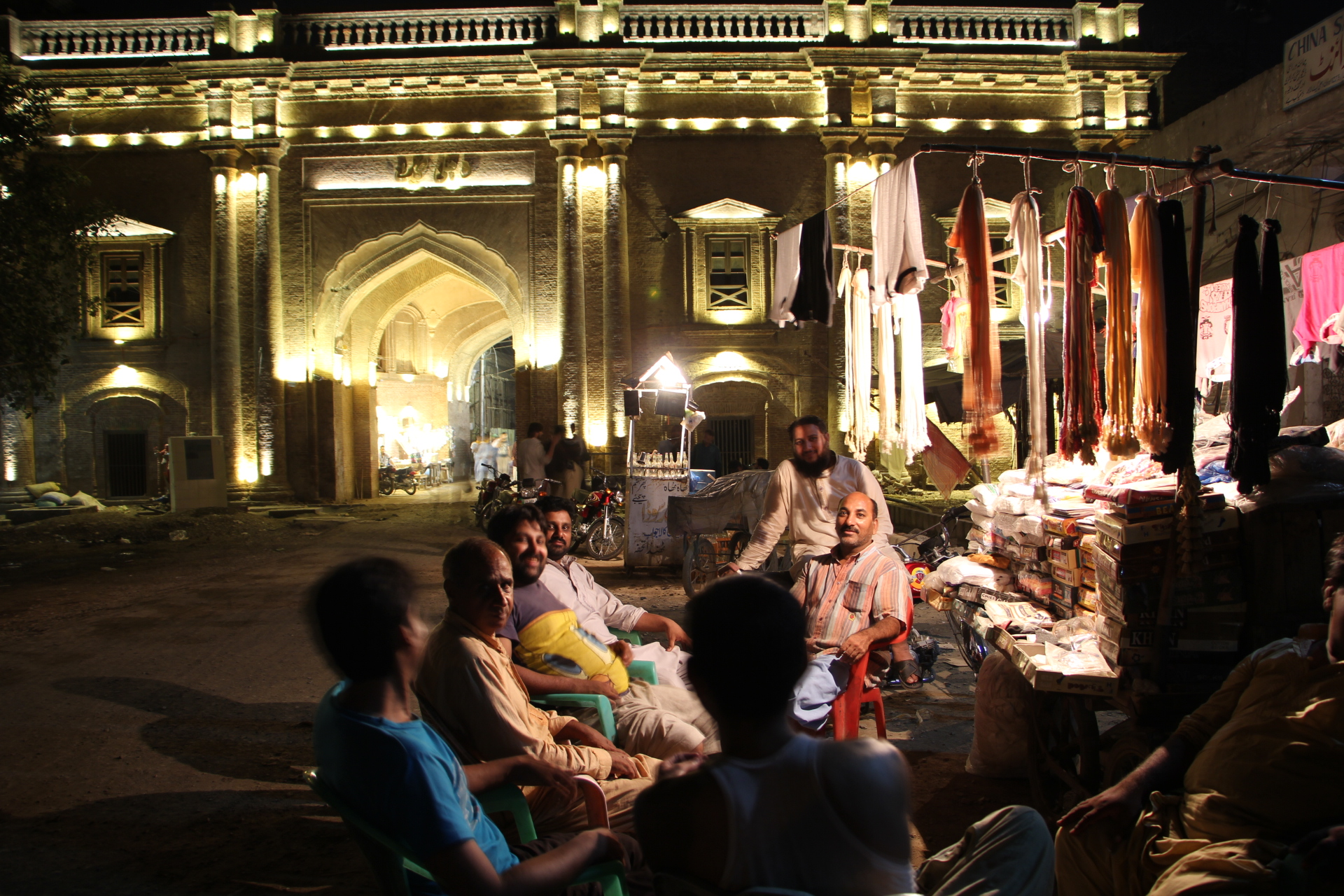
Within the gate's vicinity are several shops and stalls.

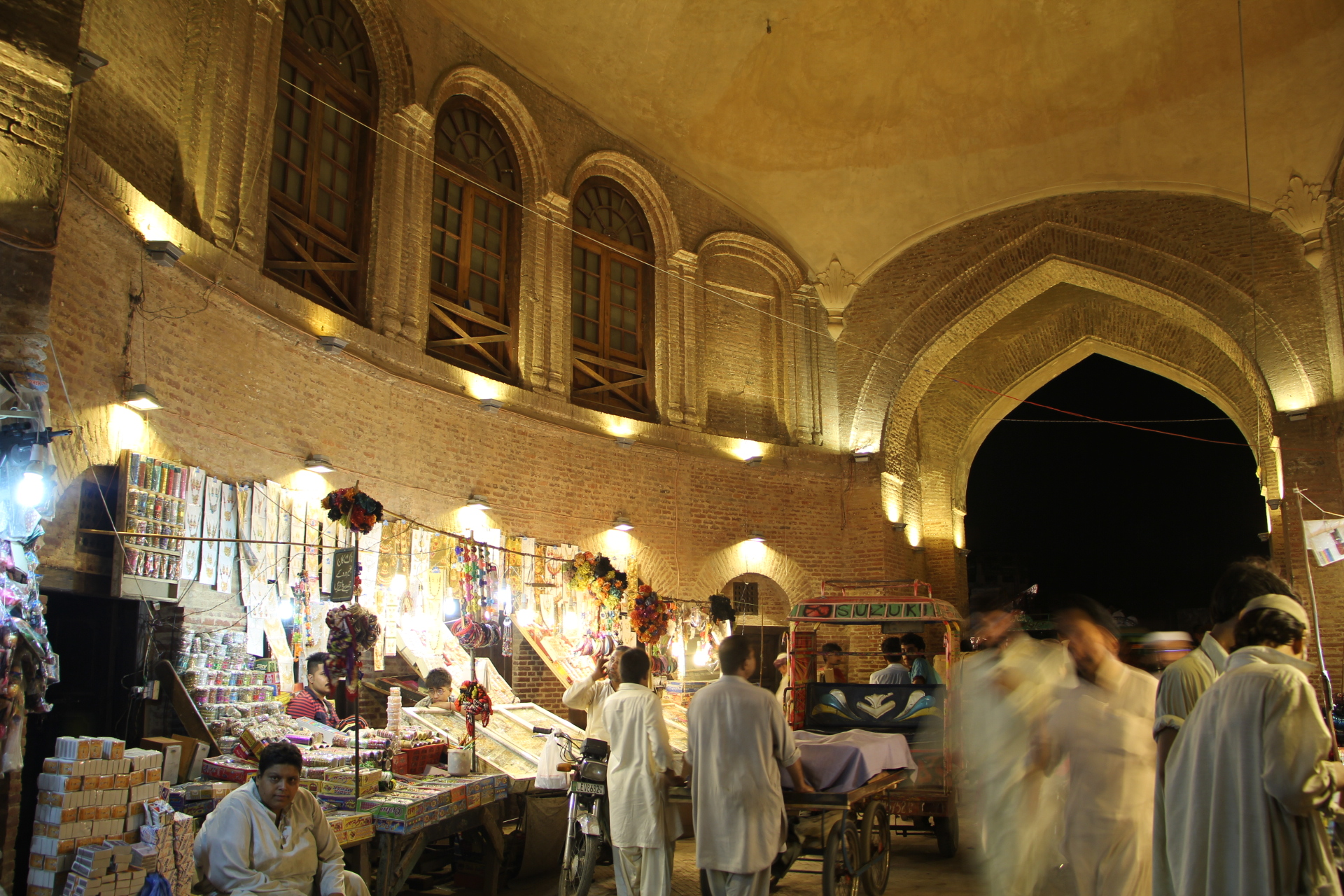
Delhi Gate's night market.

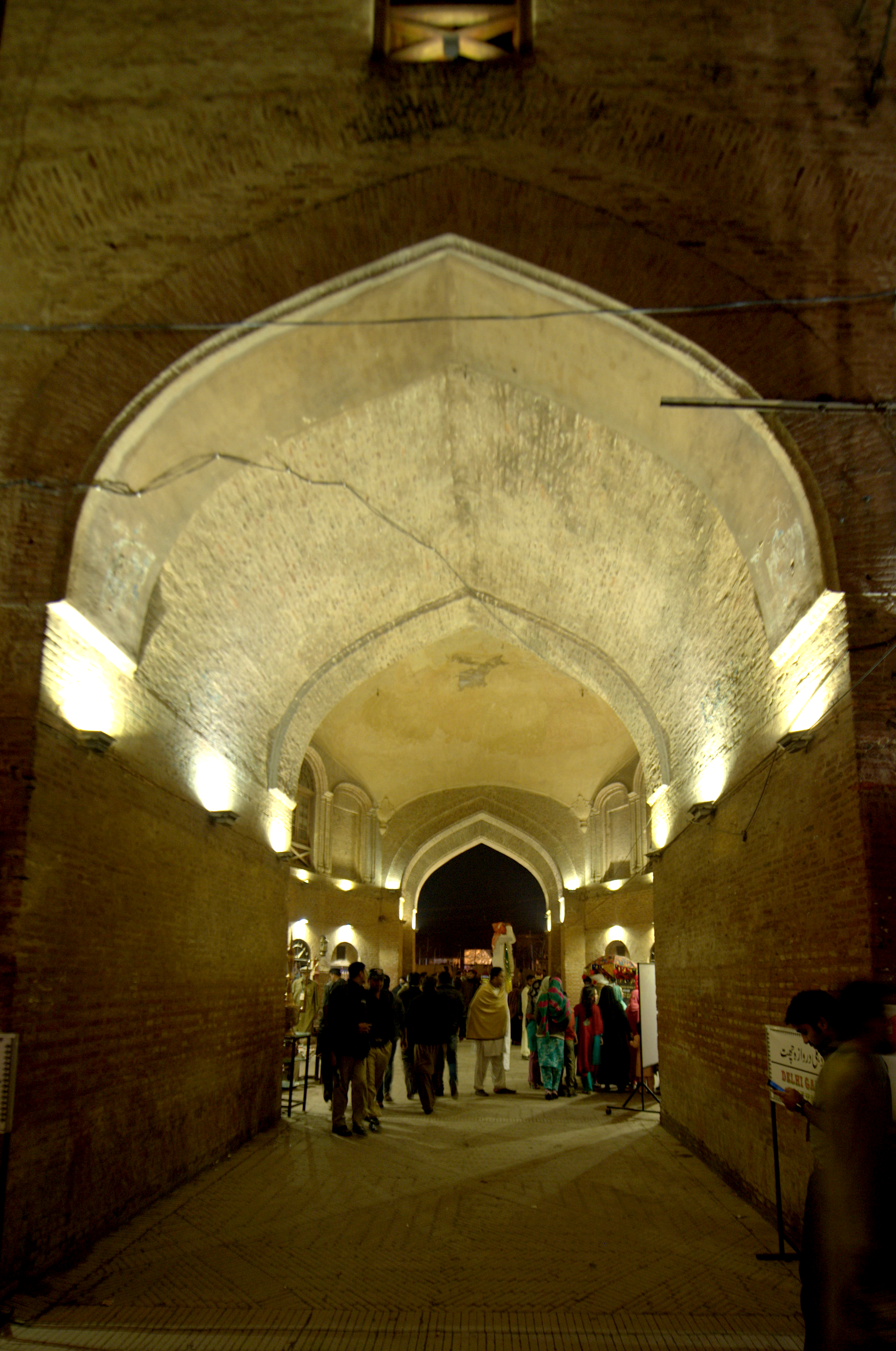
Entrance to the gateway is illuminated at night.

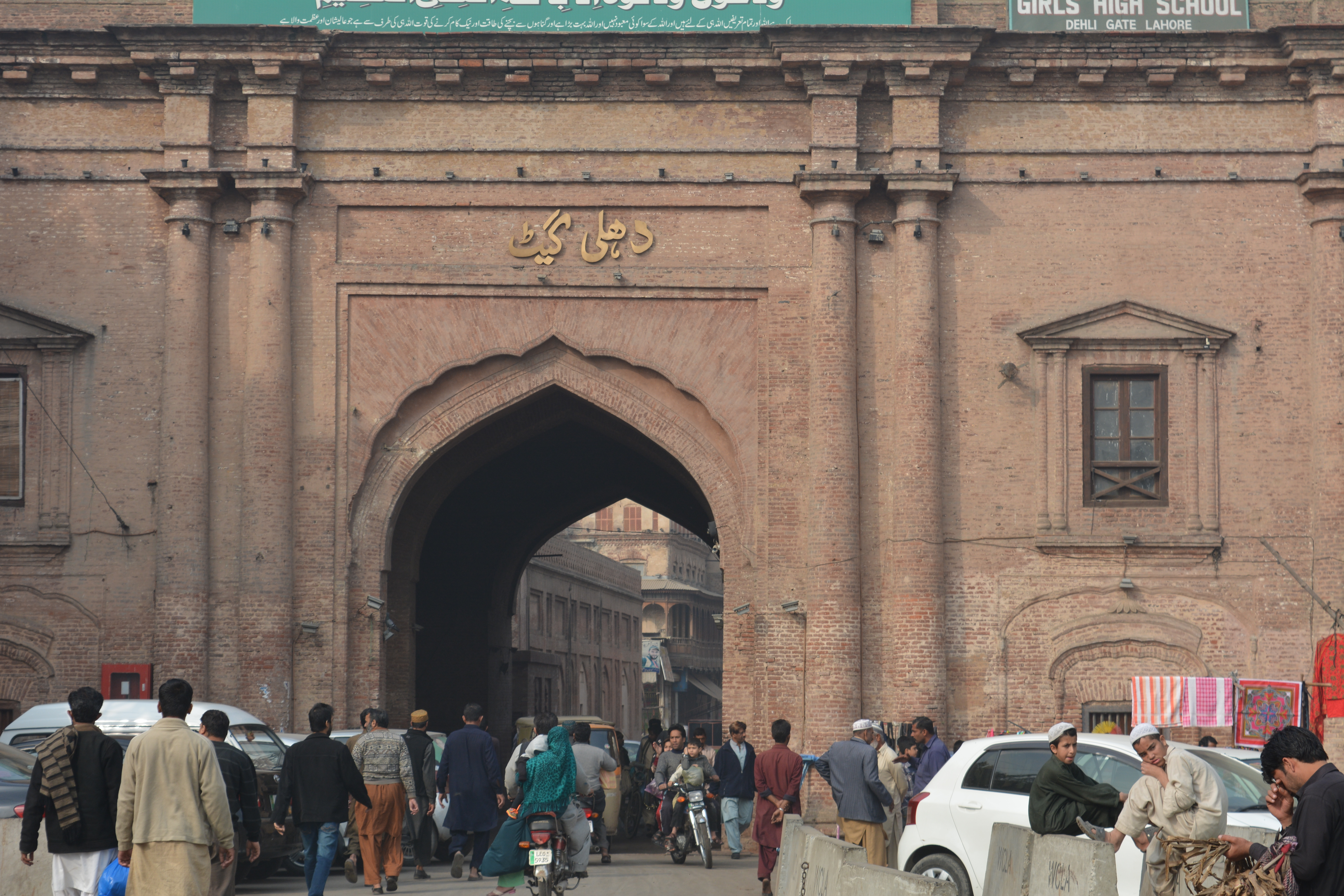

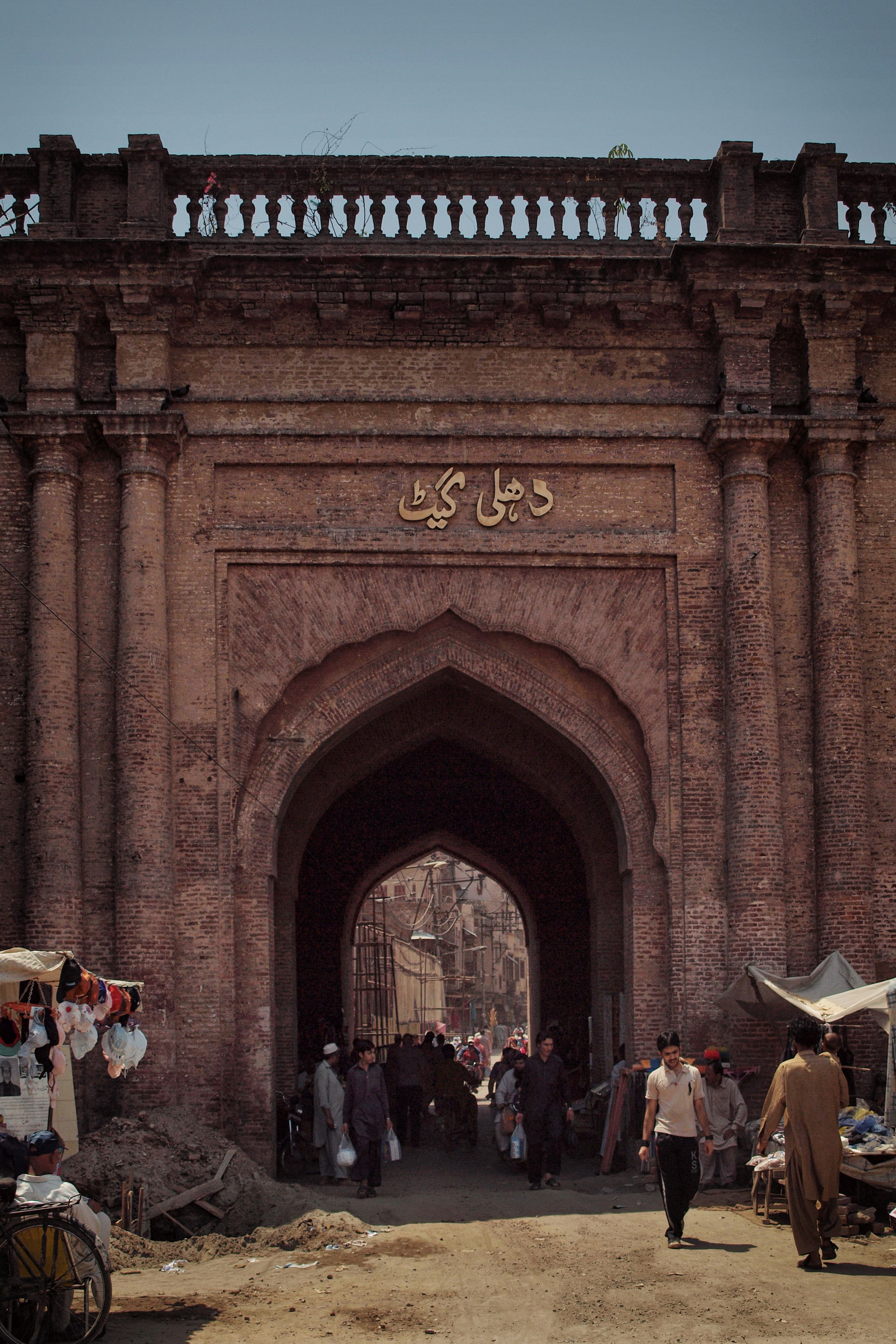

== See also ==
- Lahore
- Lahore Fort
- Walled City of Lahore
- Wazir Khan Mosque
- Shahi Hammam
- Badshahi Mosque
- Mori Gate
