= Pakistani architecture =

Pakistani architecture is intertwined with the architecture of the broader Indian subcontinent. Major historical architectural styles include Hindu temple, Buddhist, Jain, Indo-Islamic, Mughal and Indo-Saracenic architecture, all of which have many regional varieties. In the mid-3rd millennium BC, the land that is now Pakistan witnessed the rise of the Indus Valley Civilisation—South Asia's first great urban culture—marked by advanced city planning and enduring architectural marvels, some of which survive to this day. This was followed by the Gandhara style of Buddhist architecture that borrowed elements from ancient Greece. These remnants are visible in the Gandhara capital of Taxila.

Indo-Islamic architecture emerged during the medieval period, which combined Indian and Persianaite elements. The Mughal Empire ruled between the 16th and 18th centuries, and saw the rise of Mughal architecture, most prevalent in Lahore.

During the British colonial period, European styles such as the Baroque, Gothic and Neoclassical became prevalent. The British, like the Mughals, built elaborate buildings to project their power. The Indo-Saracenic style, a fusion of British and Indo-Islamic elements also developed. After independence, modern architectural styles like the International style became popular.

== Harappan architecture ==
Archaeologists excavated numerous Bronze Age cities, among them are Mohenjo Daro, Harrappa and Kot Diji from the 3rd millennium BCE. They have a uniform, appropriate structure with broad roads as well as well thought out sanitary and drainage facilities. The majority of the discovered brick constructions are public buildings such as bath houses and workshops. Wood and loam served as construction materials. Large scale temples, such as those found in other ancient cities are missing. With the collapse of the Indus Valley Civilisation the architecture also suffered considerable damage.

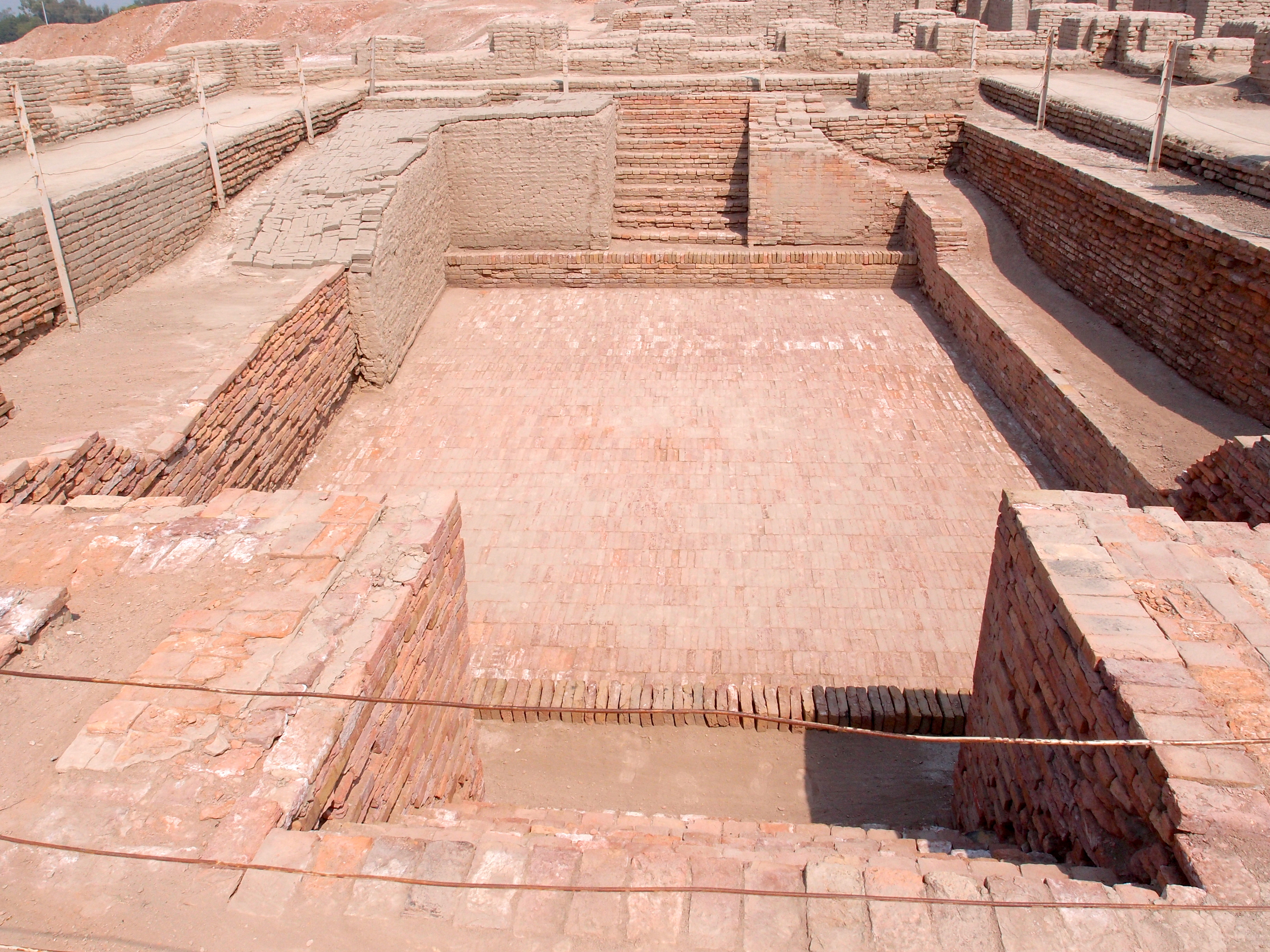
View of Mohenjo Daro towards the Great Bath.

Little is known about this civilization, often called Harappan, partly because it disappeared about 1700 BC for reasons unknown, its language remains undeciphered, its existence was revealed only in the 1920s, and excavations have been limited. Surviving evidences indicate a sophisticated civilization. Cities like Harappa and Mohenjo-Daro (the "City of the Dead") had populations of some 35,000, they were laid out according to a grid system. Inhabitants lived in windowless baked brick houses built around a central courtyard. These cities also had a citadel, where the public and religious buildings were located, large pools for ritual bathing, granaries for the storage of food, and a complex system of covered drains and sewers. The latter rivaled the engineering skill of the Romans some 2,000 years later.

== Gandharan architecture ==
During classical antiquity, a special Gandharan architecture evolved in the ancient region of Gandhara with the rise of Buddhism. In addition, the Persian and Greek influence led to the development of the Greco-Buddhist style, starting from the 1st century AD. The high point of this era was reached with the culmination of the Gandhara style.

Important remnants of Buddhist construction are stupas and other buildings with clearly recognizable Greek statues and style elements like support columns which, beside ruins from other epochs, are found in the Gandhara capital Taxila in the extreme north of the Punjab. A particularly beautiful example of Buddhist architecture is the ruins of the Buddhist monastery Takht-i-Bahi in the northwest province.

Gandharan architectural style

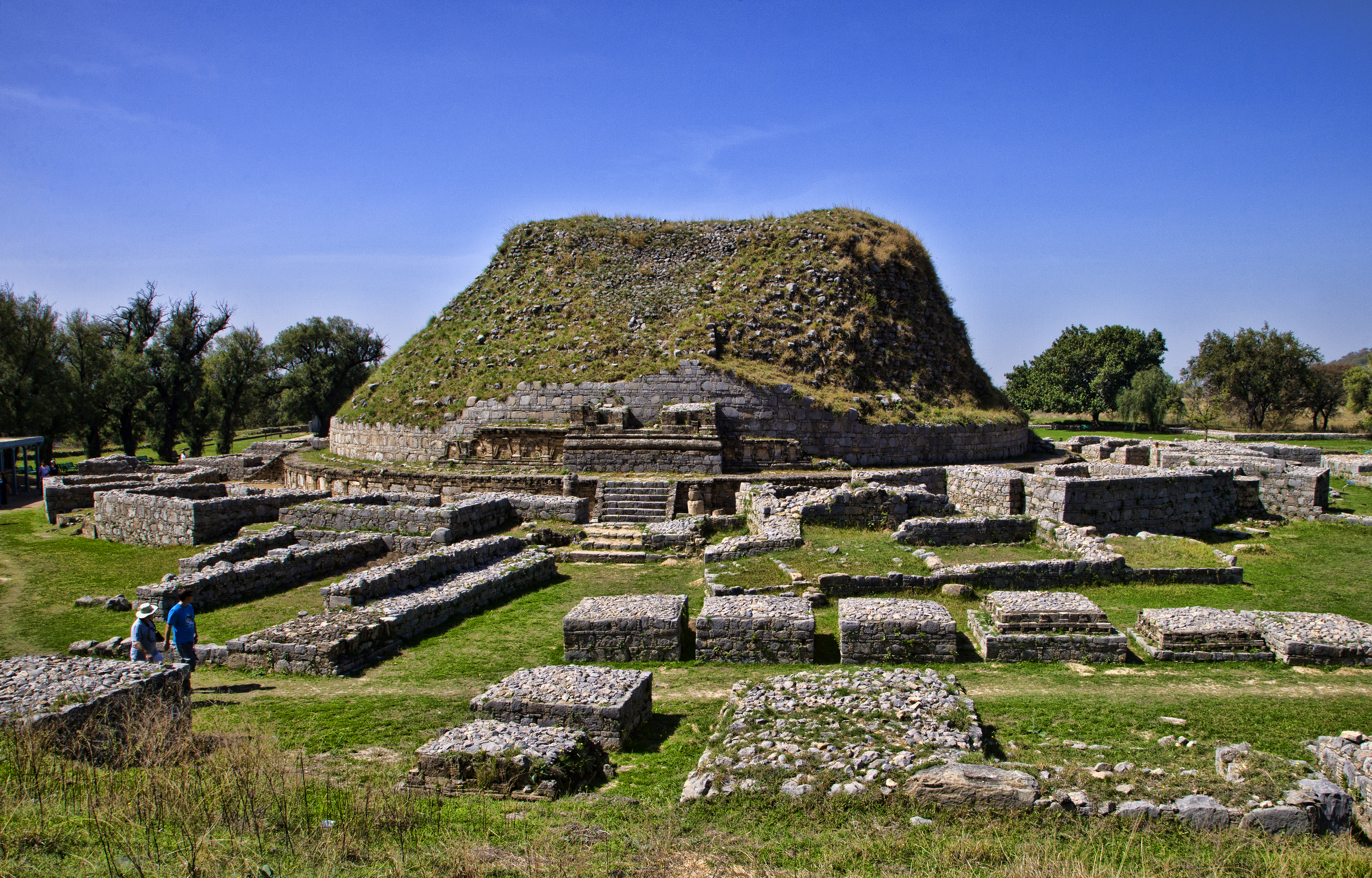
Dharmarajika Stupa in Taxila

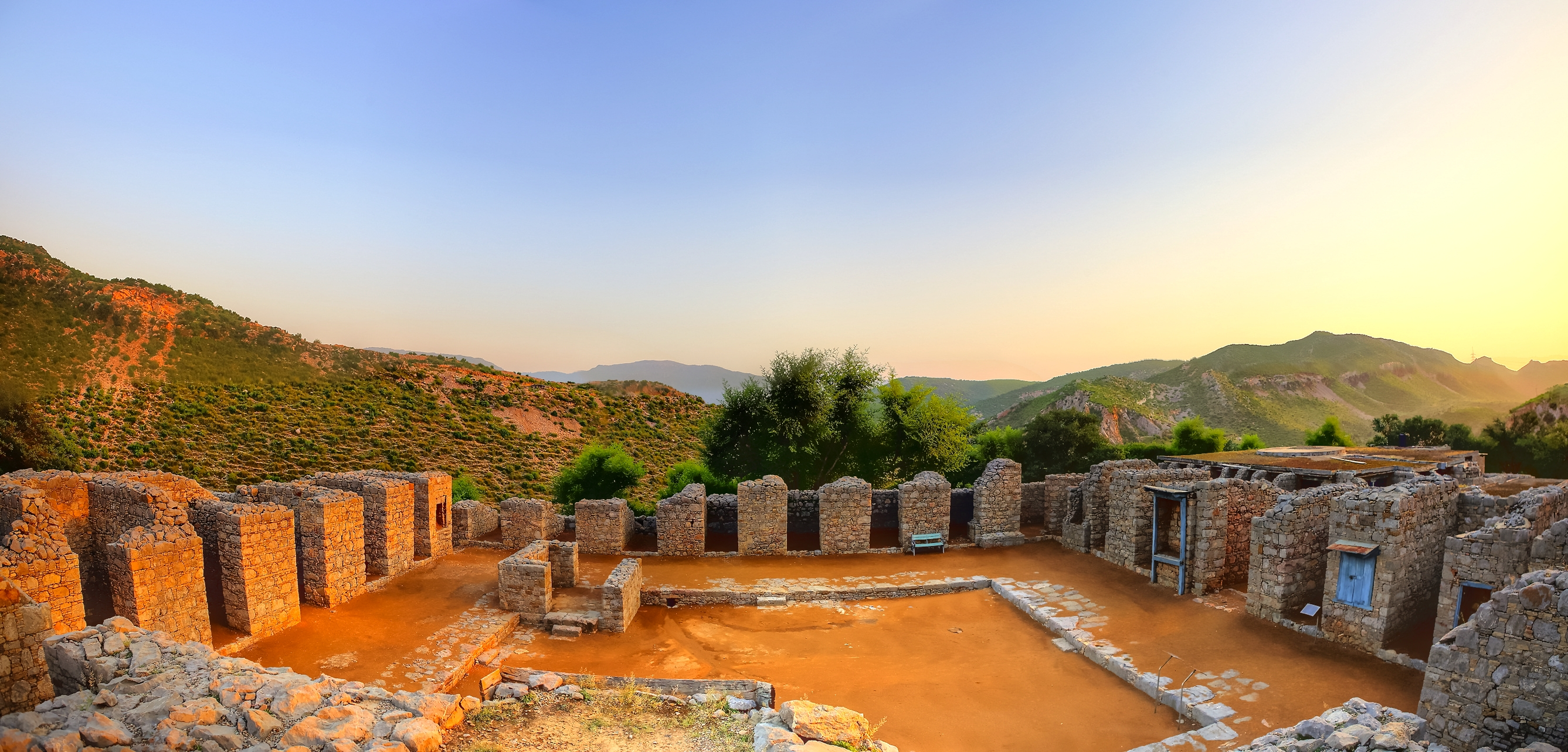
Jaulian, an example of Gandharan architecture

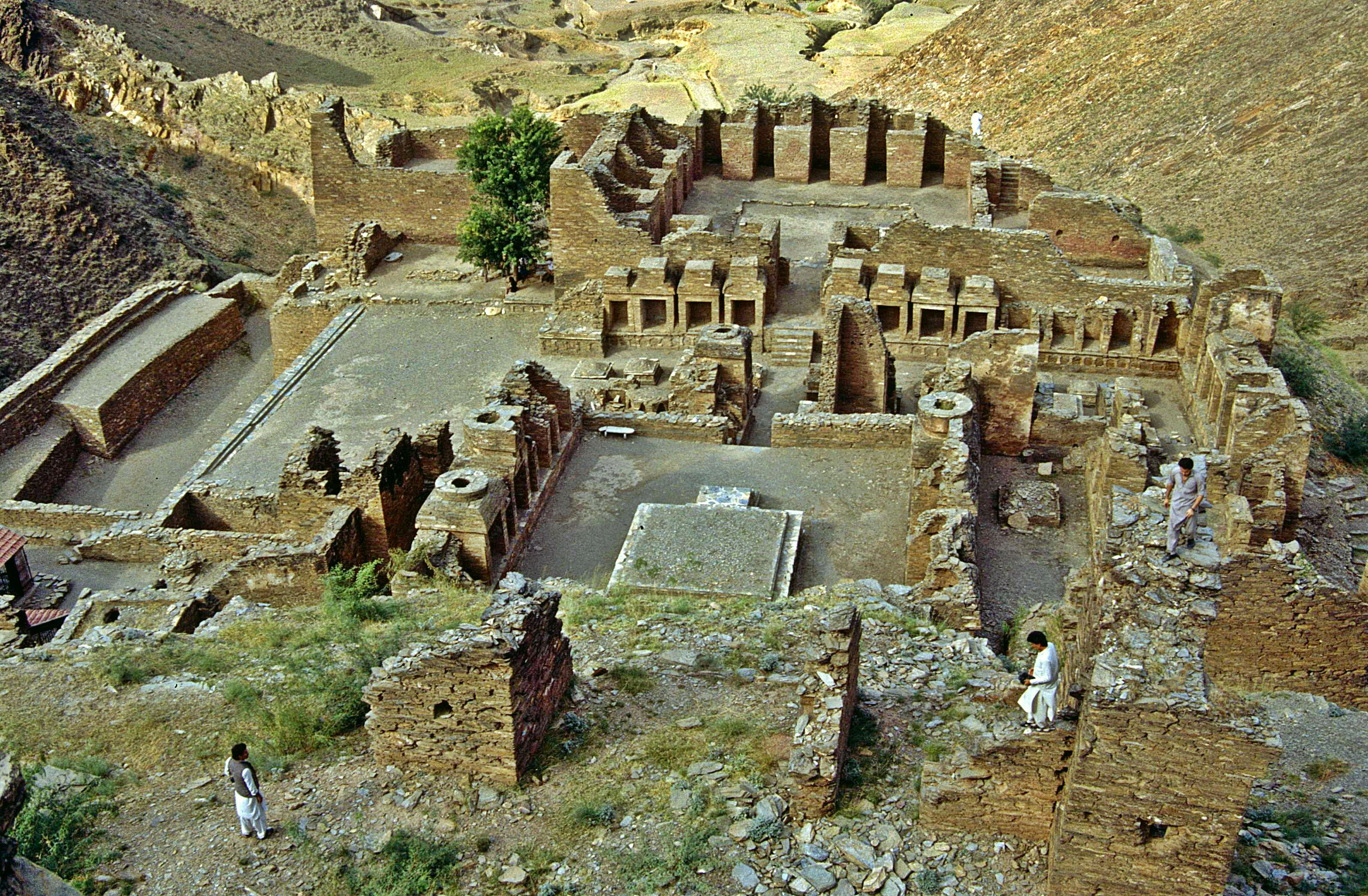
Takht-i-Bahi complex

== Hindu temple architecture ==
During the pre-Islamic era in Pakistan, there was a prominent population of Hindus, especially in the Punjab region and Sindh. The important temples built during that era include:

The Shri Katas Raj Temples (Punjabi, Urdu: شری کٹاس راج مندر) also known as Qila Katas (قلعہ کٹاس), is a complex of several Hindu temples connected to one another by walkways. The temple complex surrounds a pond named Katas which is regarded as sacred by Hindus. The complex is located in the Potohar Plateau region of Pakistan's Punjab province.

The Amb Temples (Urdu: امب مندر) are part of a Hindu temple complex located at the western edge of the Salt Range in Pakistan's Punjab province. The temple complex was built in the 7th to 9th centuries CE during the reign of the Hindu Shahi empire. The main temple is roughly 15 to 20 metres tall, and has three stories, with stairwells leading to inner ambulatories.

The Shri Varun Dev Mandir and Sharada Peeth are other examples of Hindu temple architecture in Pakistan.

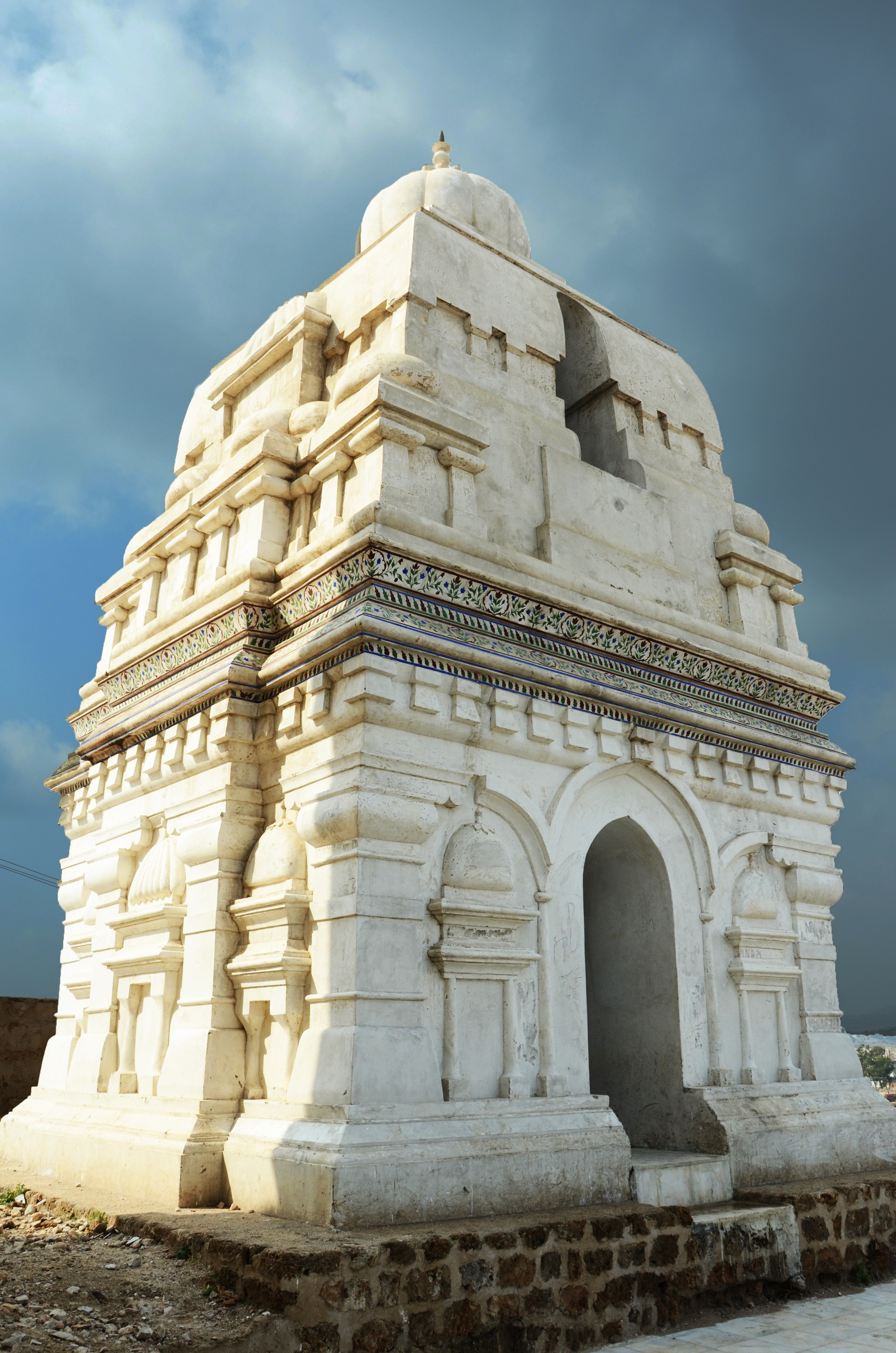
Temples at Katas Raj display characteristics of Kashmiri Hindu temples

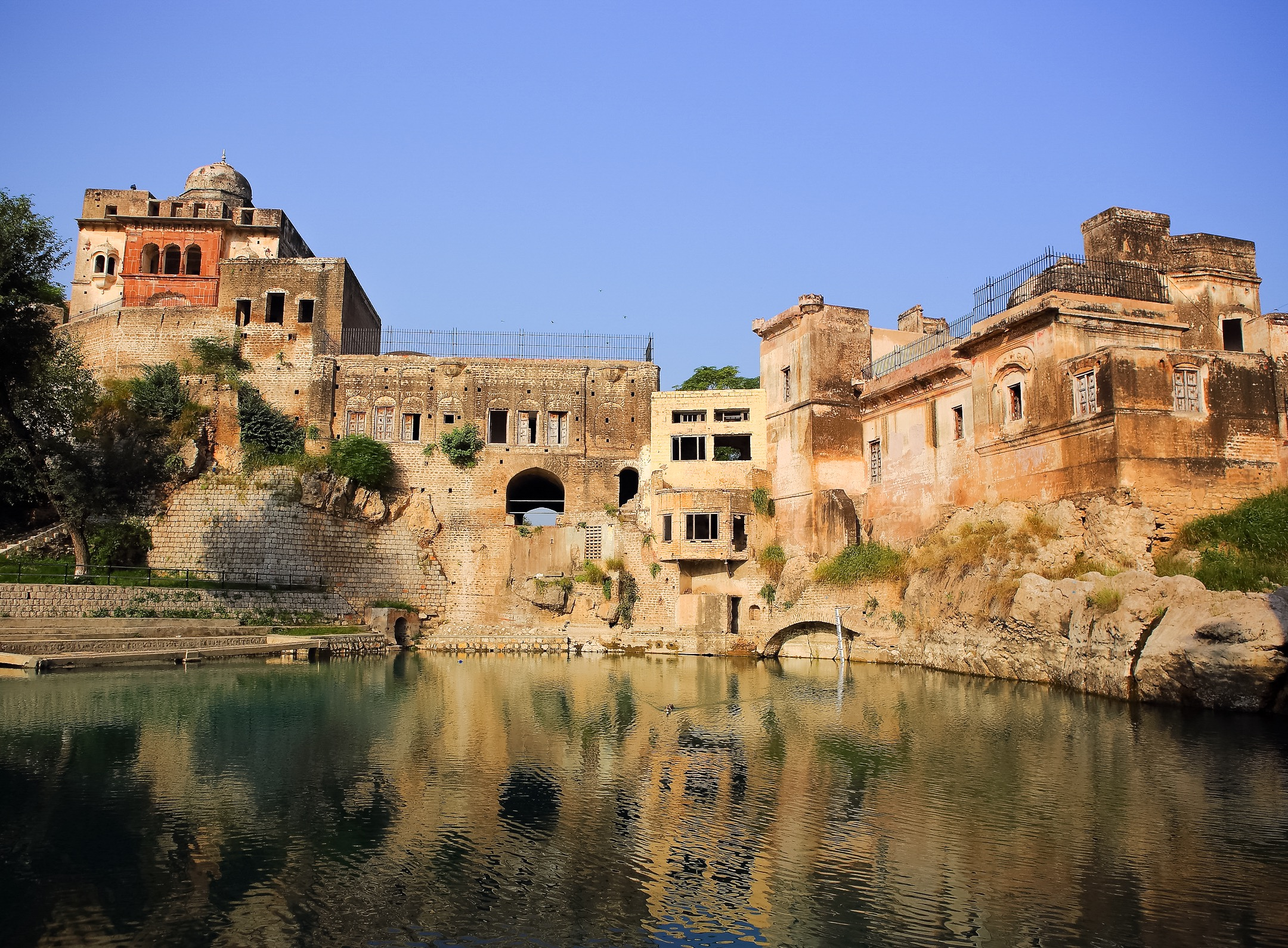
Katas Raj Temples (4th century) in Pakistan

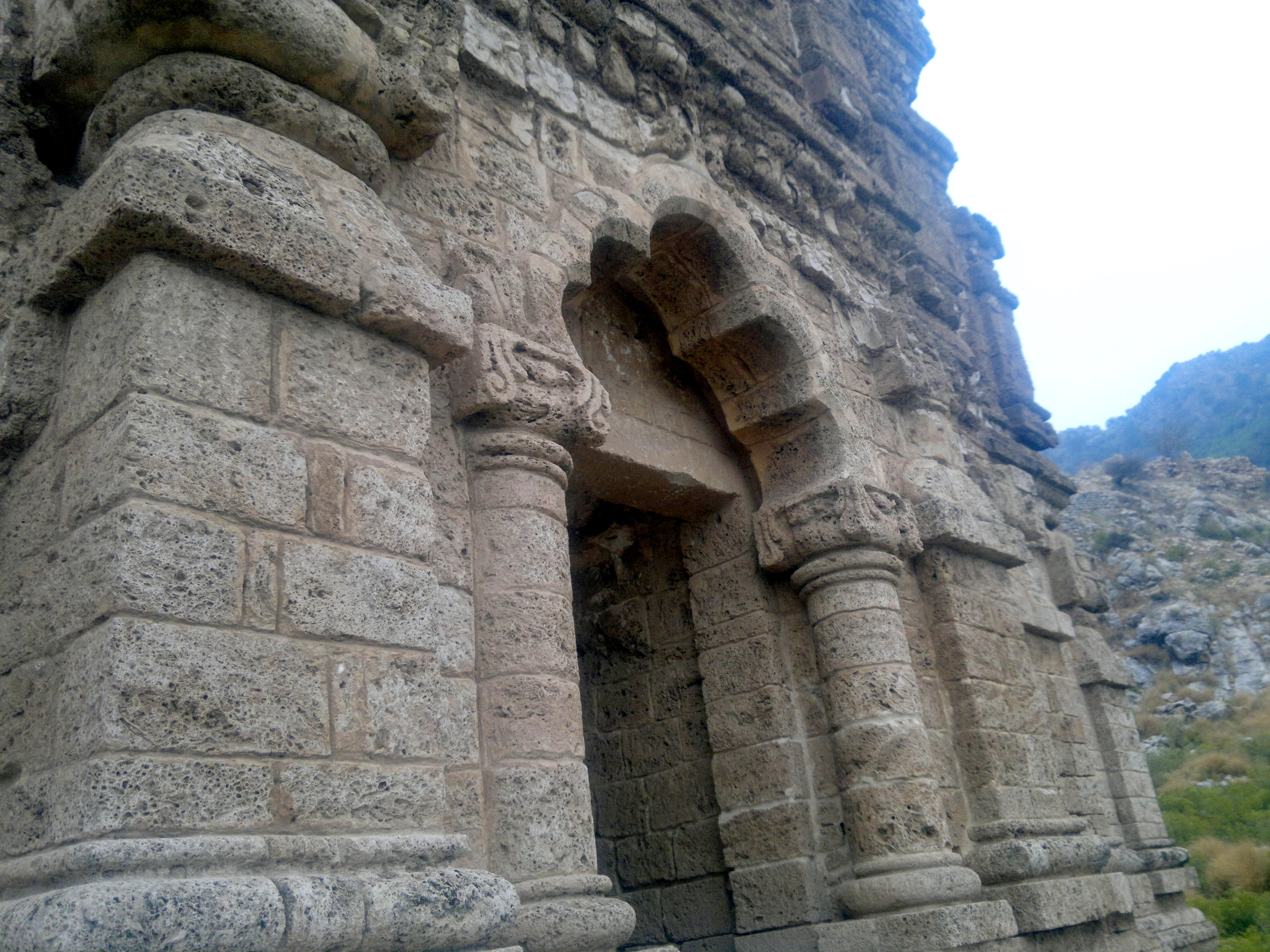
One of the Amb Temples constructed between the 7th and 9th centuries

== Jain architecture ==
The Nagarparkar Jain Temples (Urdu: نگرپارکر جین مندر) are located in the region around Nagarparkar, in Pakistan's southern Sindh province. The site consists of a collection of Jain temples. They were built in Māru-Gurjara style in 12th century AD to the 15th century - a period when Jain architectural expression was at its zenith. The temples were inscribed on the tentative list for UNESCO World Heritage status in 2016 as the Nagarparkar Cultural Landscape.

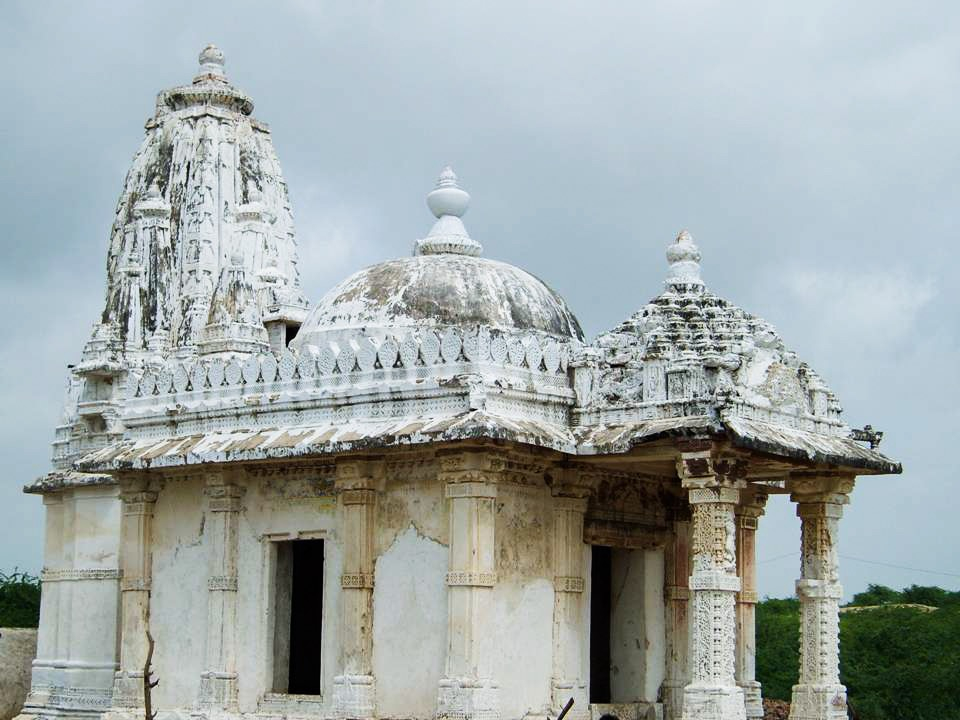
Viravah temple, one of Jain temples at Nagarparkar

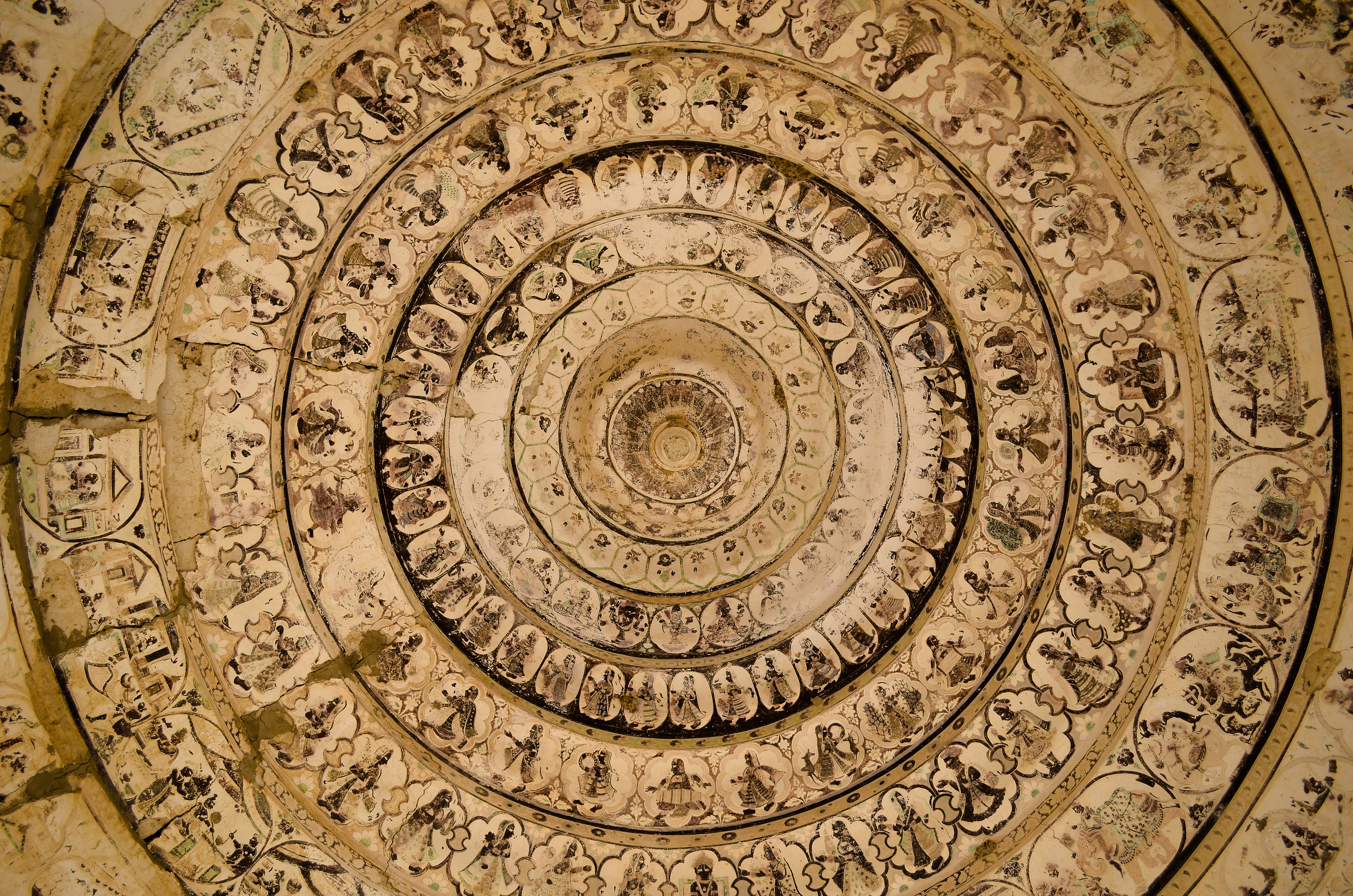
Frescoes at Gori temple of the Nagarparkar Jain Temples

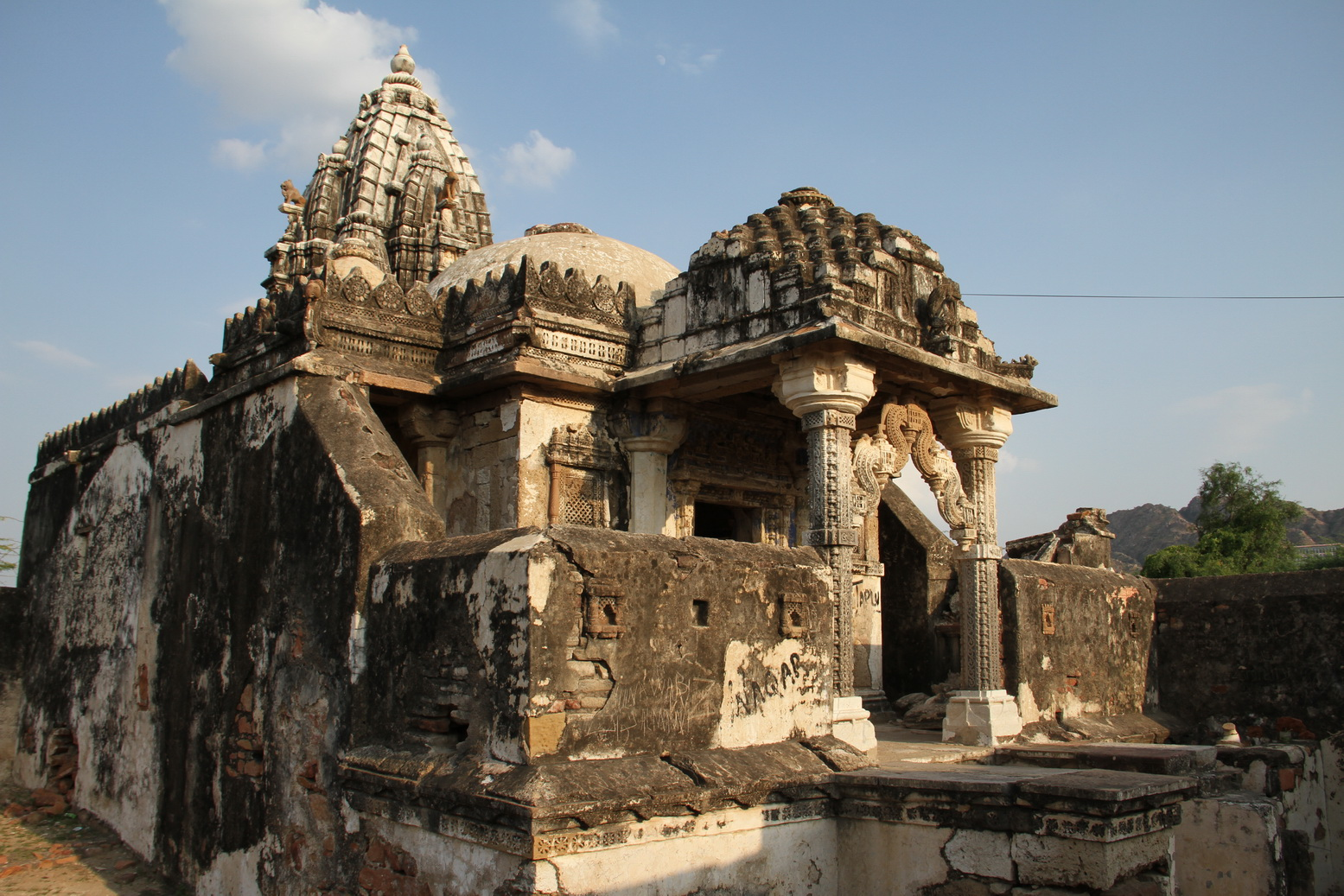
One of ancient Jain temples at Nagarparkar

== Indo-Islamic architecture ==
=== Early Era (8th century to 16th century) ===
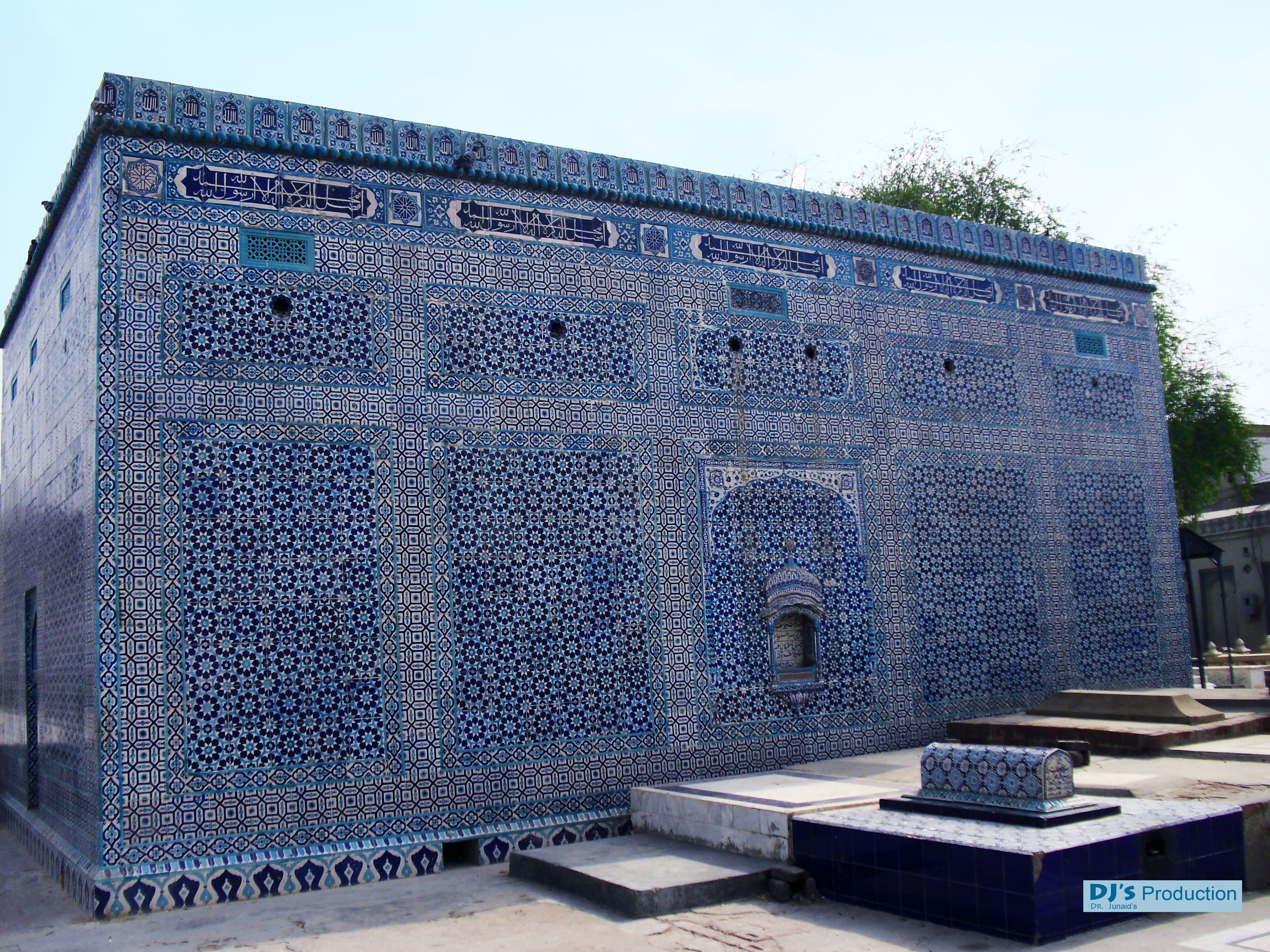
Tomb of Shah Yousuf Gardezi, Multan

The arrival of Islam in today's Pakistan - first in Sindh - during the 8th century CE meant a sudden end of Buddhist architecture. However, a smooth transition to predominantly pictureless Islamic architecture occurred.

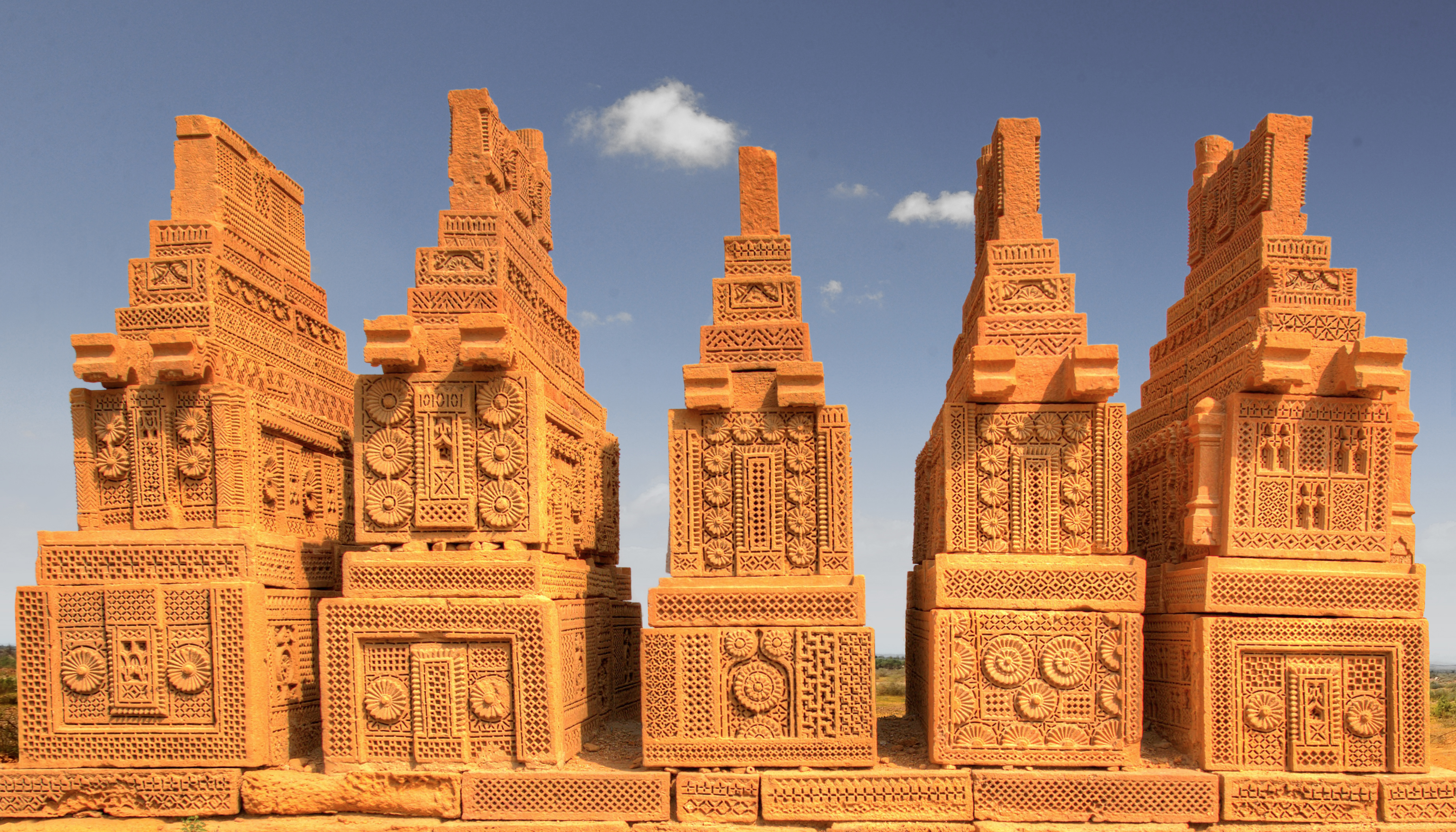
Chaukhandi Tombs are intricately carved

The earliest example of a mosque from the days of infancy of Islam in South Asia is the Mihrablose mosque of Banbhore, from the year 727, the first Muslim place of worship in South Asia. Under the Delhi Sultan, the Persian-centralasiatic style ascended over Arab influences. The most important characteristic of this style is the Iwan, walled on three sides, with one end entirely open. Further characteristics are wide prayer halls, round domes with mosaics and geometrical samples and the use of painted tiles. The most important of the few completely discovered buildings of Islamic architecture is the tomb of the Shah Rukn-i-Alam (built 1320 to 1324) in Multan.

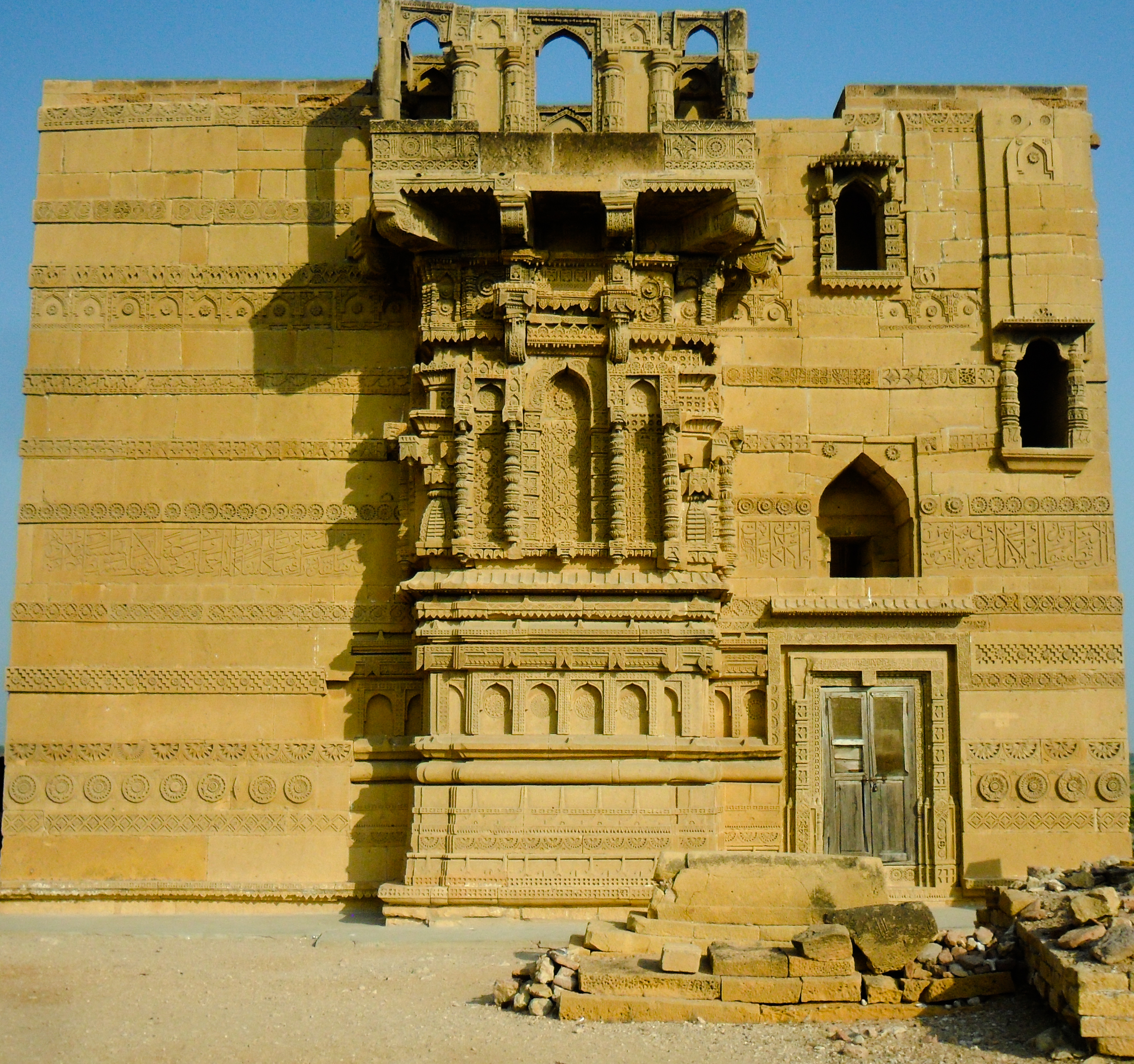
Jam Nizamuddin II's tomb features a jharoka that displays Gujarati influences

The Makli Necropolis at Thatta, which includes tombs of various rulers, noblemen and Sufi saints of Sindh was built between the 14th and 18th centuries. It showcases a wide variety of architecture, including Indo-Islamic, Persian, Hindu and Rajput and Gujarati influences. The Chaukhandi Tombs near Karachi are similar in style.

Other examples include the Rohtas Fort built by Sher Shah Suri in the 16th century, and the Tombs of the Talpur Mirs.

=== Mughal Architecture (16th–18th centuries CE) ===
Mughal architecture emerged in the medieval period during the reign of the Mughal Empire in the 15th to 17th centuries. Mughal buildings have a uniform pattern of structure and character, including large bulbous domes, slender minarets at the corners, massive halls, large vaulted gateways and delicate ornamentation, usually surrounded by gardens on all four sides.

The buildings are usually constructed out of red sandstone and white marble, and make use of decorative work such as pachin kari and jali-latticed screens.

The earliest example in Pakistan is the Lahore Fort, which had existed at least since the 11th century but was completely rebuilt by various Mughal Emperors like Akbar and Jahangir (1556–1627) . The Tomb of Anarkali, Hiran Minar and Begum Shahi Mosque also date back to this period.

The Tomb of Jahangir, the fourth Mughal Emperor, was completed in 1637 during the reign of his son and successor Shah Jahan. The Emperor had forbidden the construction of a dome over his tomb, and thus the roof is simple and free of any embellishments. It stands amidst a garden which also houses the Tomb of Nur Jahan, Tomb of Asif Khan and Akbari Sarai, one of the most well-preserved caravanserais in Pakistan.

Mughal architecture reached its zenith in the 17th century during the reign of Shah Jahan. During this time, several additions were made to the Lahore Fort. Other masterpieces of this time include the Wazir Khan Mosque, Dai Anga Mosque, Tomb of Dai Anga, Shalimar Gardens and Shahi Hammam in Lahore. The Shah Jahan Mosque in Thatta reflects a heavy Persian influence.

The Badshahi Mosque in Lahore was built during the reign of Aurangzeb in 1673. It is made out of red sandstone with three marble domes, very similar to the Jama Masjid of Delhi. It remains one of the largest mosques in the world.

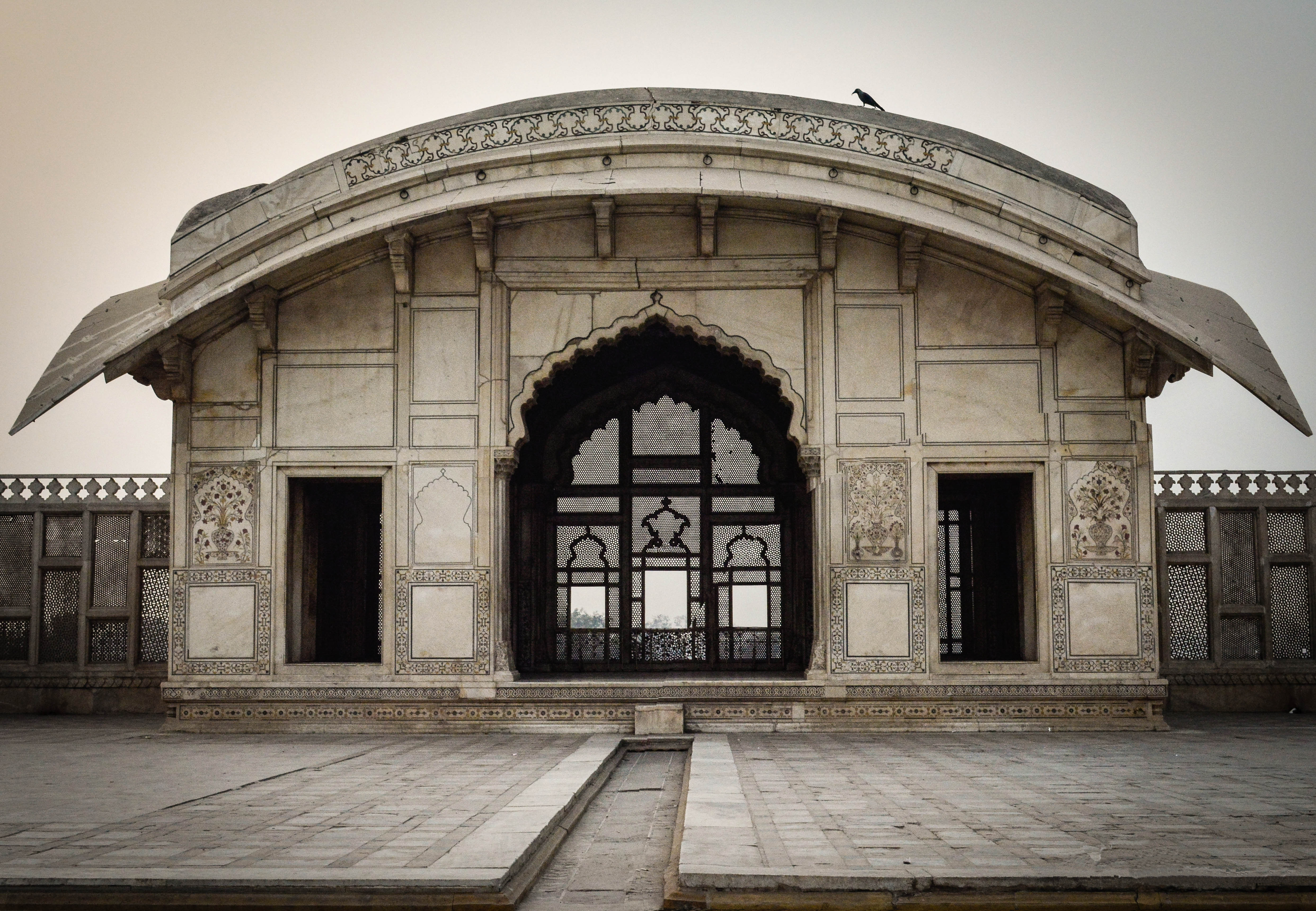
Naulakha pavilion (1633) in the Lahore Fort

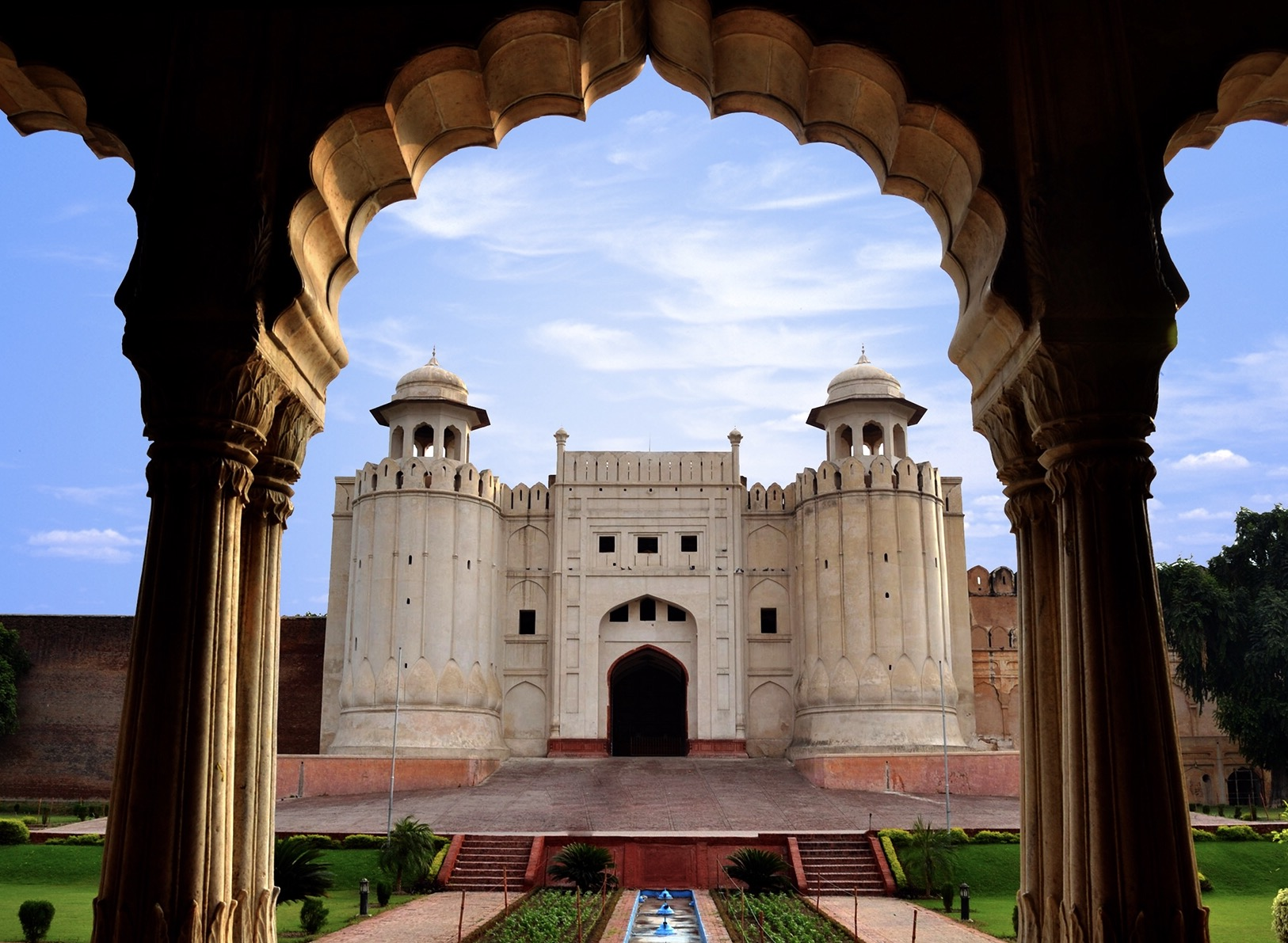
Alamgiri Gate of the Lahore Fort

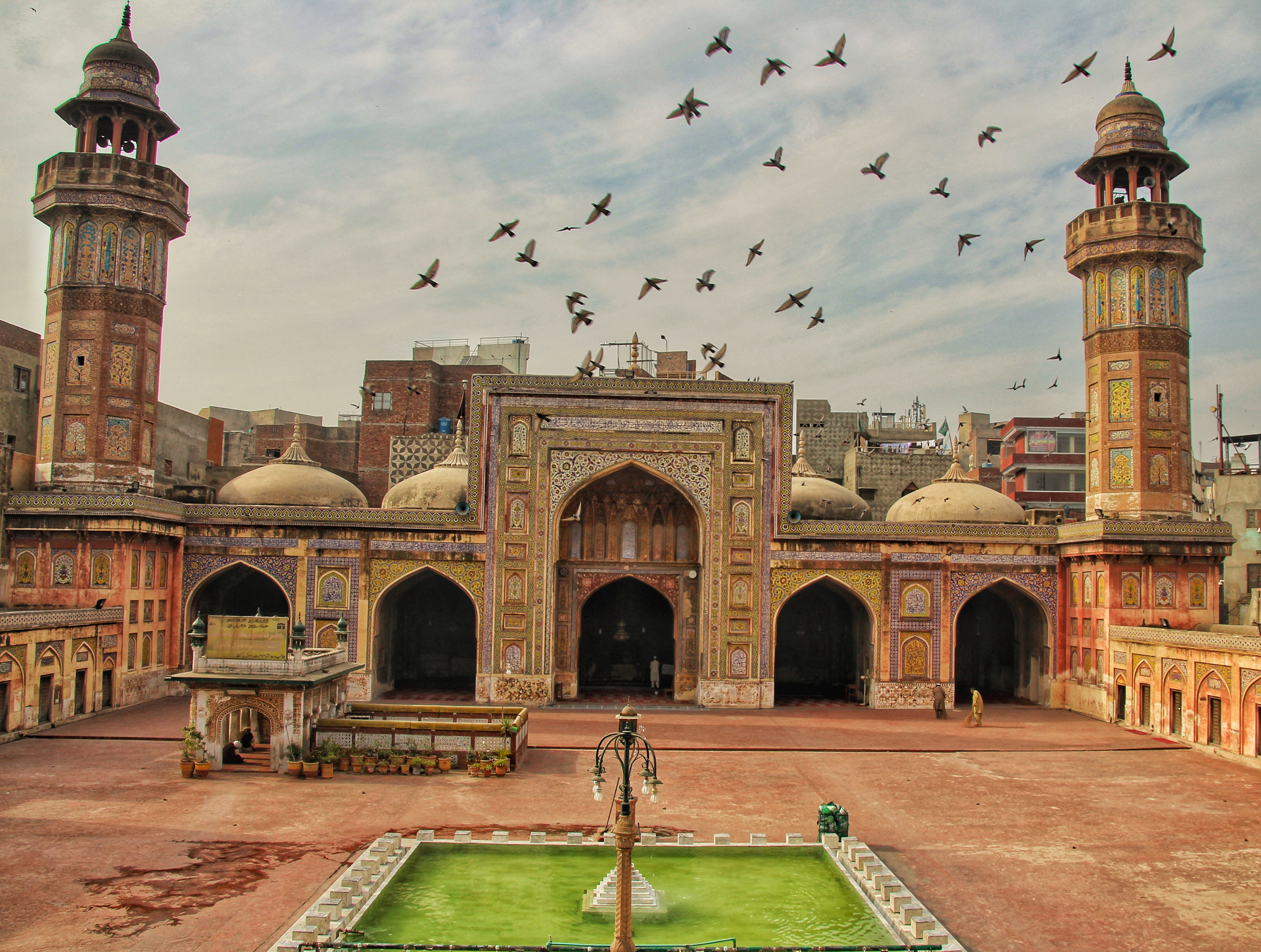
The Wazir Khan Mosque

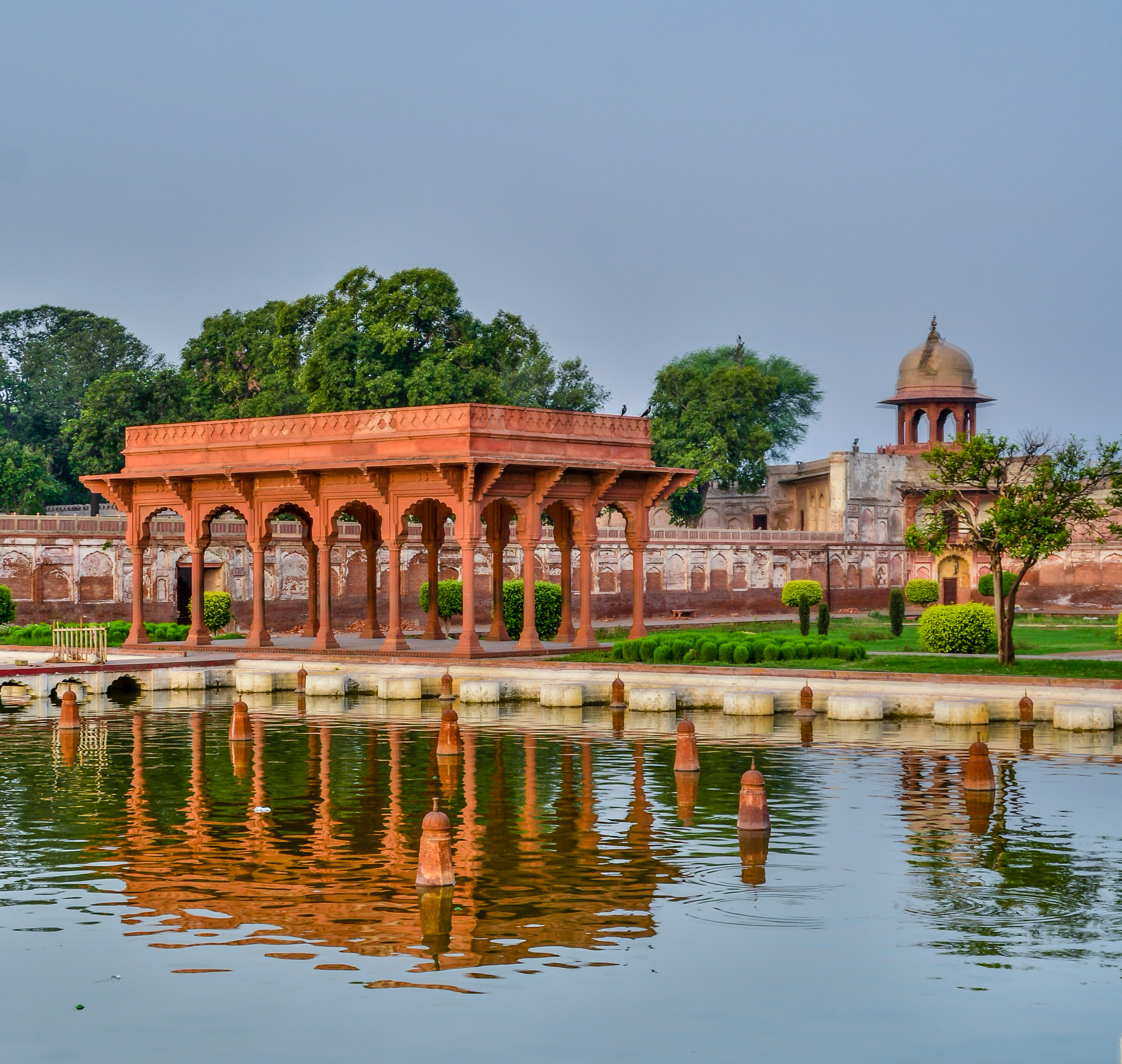
Shalimar Gardens, Lahore

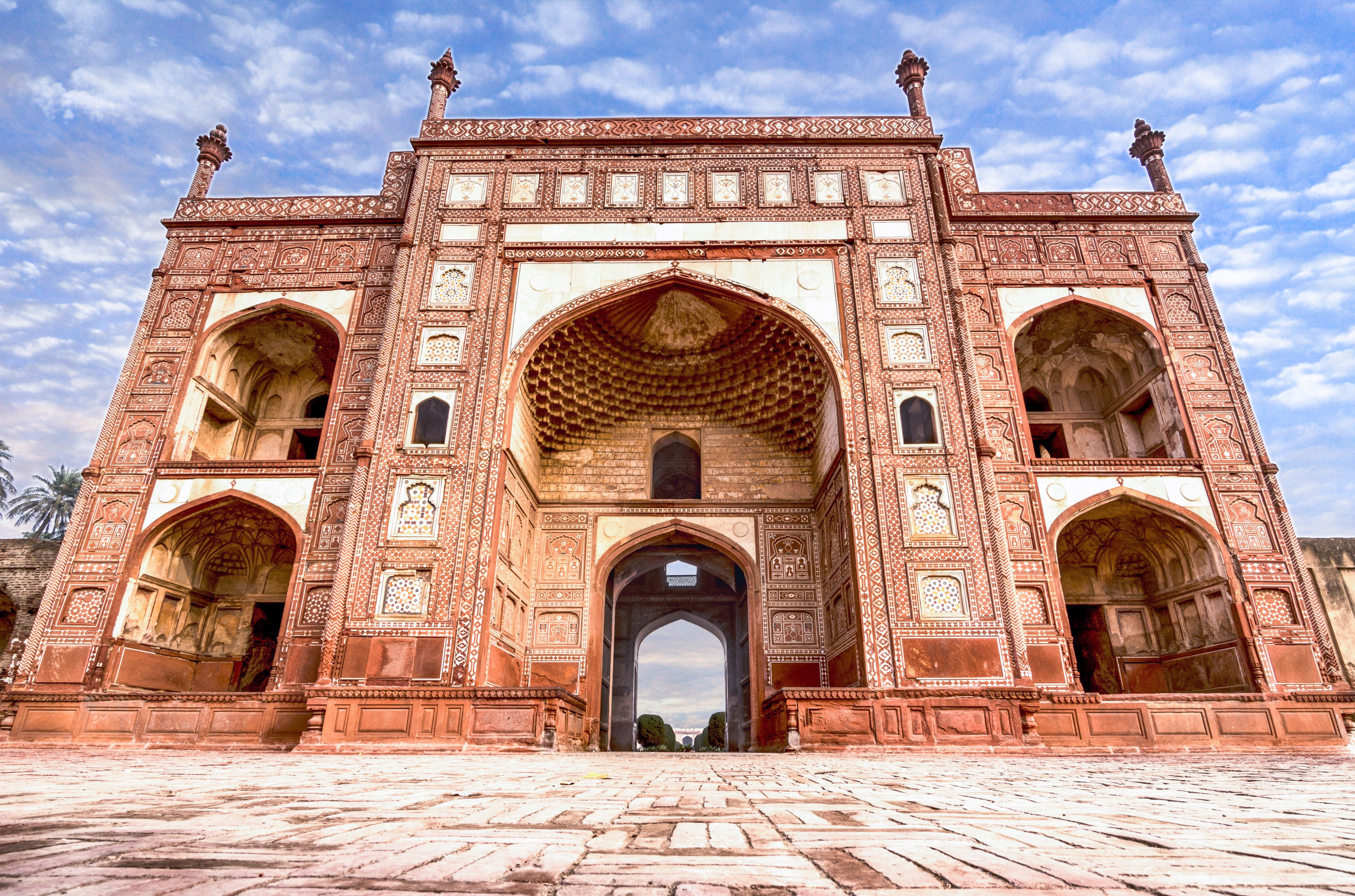
Akbari Sarai

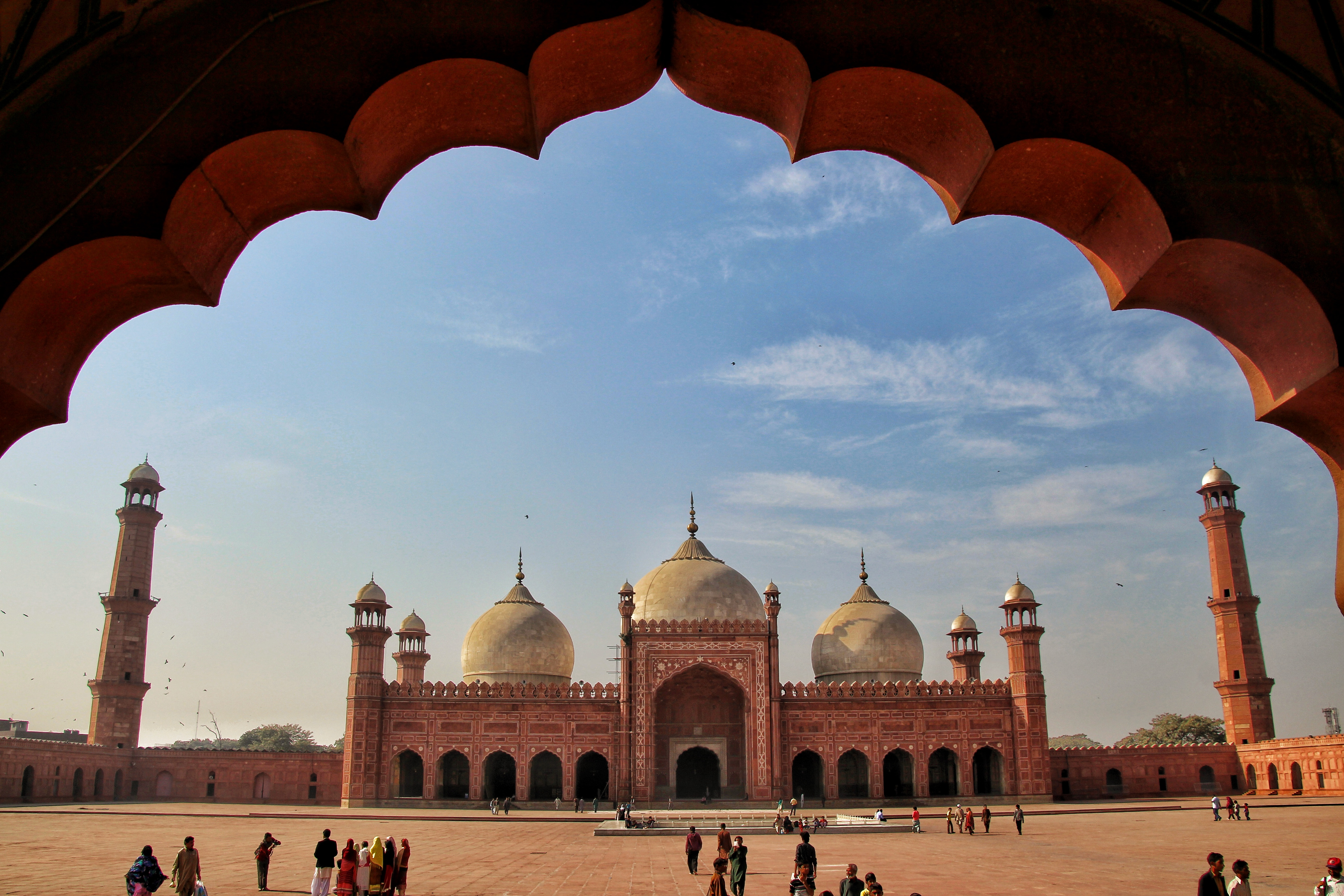
Badshahi Mosque

== Regional architecture ==
=== Architecture of Sindh ===
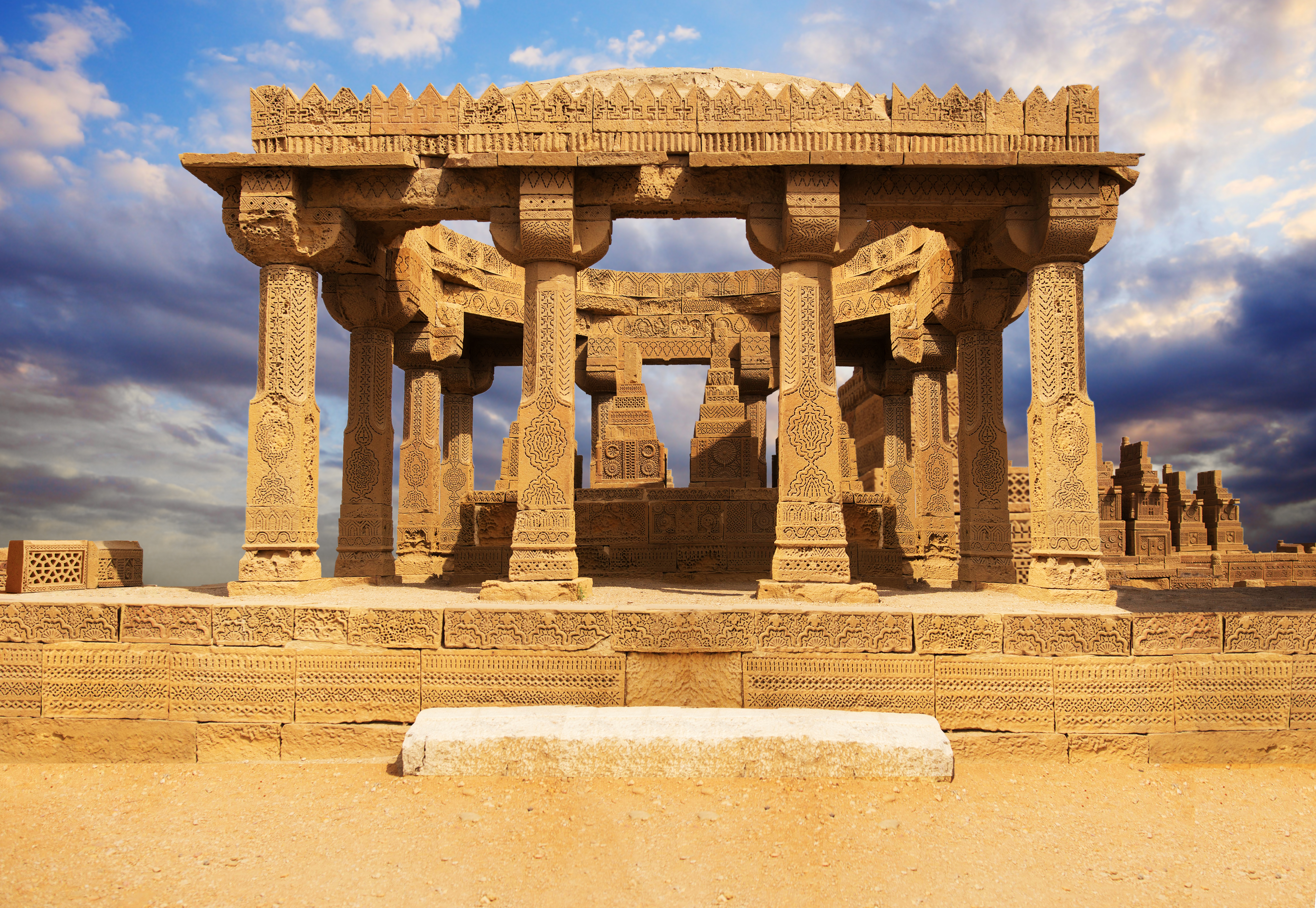
A Sindhi monument at Chaukhandi

Architecture of province of Sindh is greatly influenced from its neighbouring regions of Gujarat and Punjab, as well as broader Indo-Islamic architecture. The necropolis at Makli gives a good example of Sindhi architecture. Its architecture of the largest monuments synthesizes Muslim, Hindu, Persian, Mughal, and Gujarati influences, in the style of Lower Sindh that became known as the Chaukhandi style, named after the Chaukhandi tombs near Karachi. The Chaukhandi style came to incorporate slabs of sandstone that were carefully carved by stonemasons into intricate and elaborate designs.

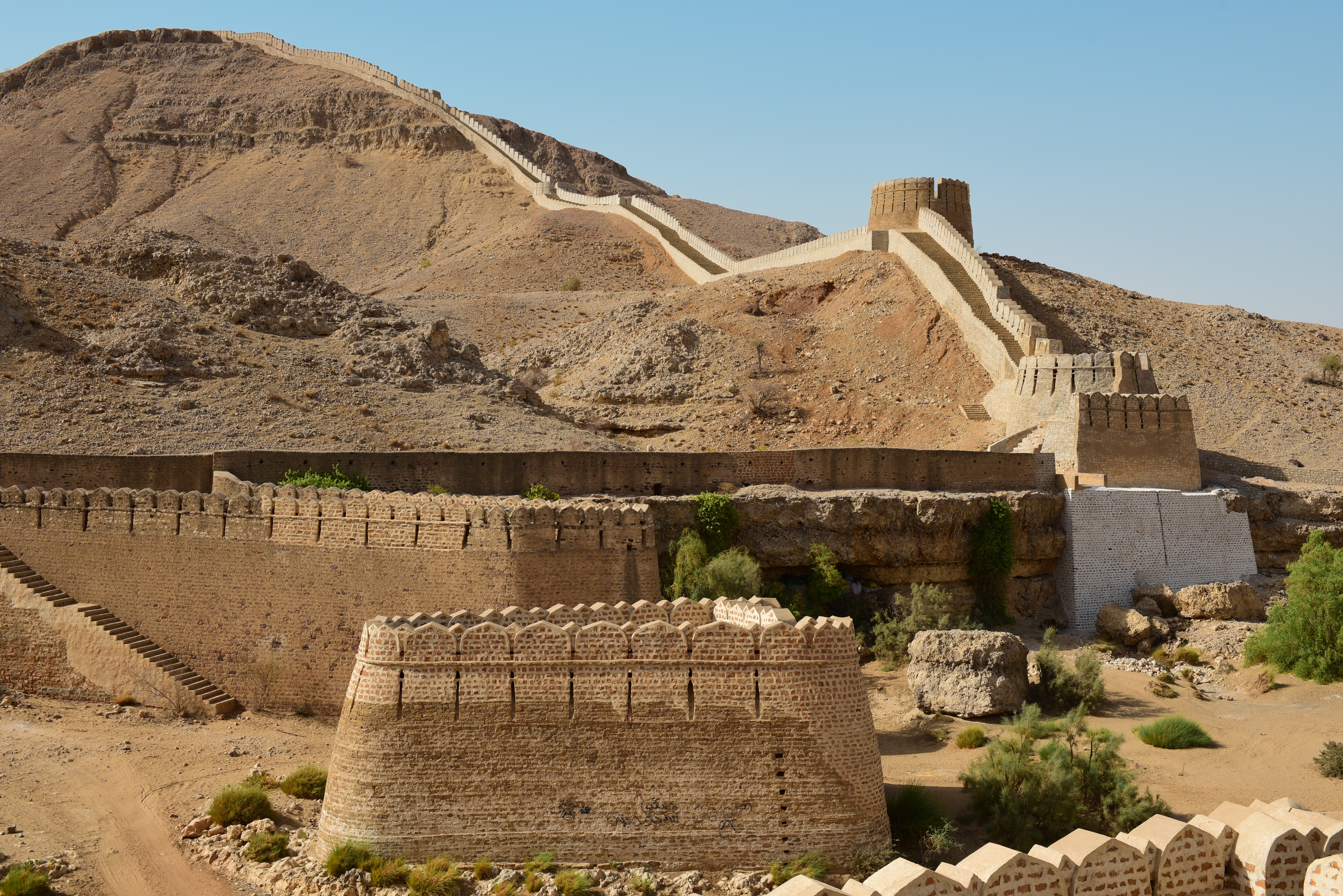
Ranikot Fort in Sindh

By the 15th century, decorated rosettes and circular patterns began to be incorporated into the tombs. More complex patterns and Arabic calligraphy with biographical information of the interred body then emerged. Larger monuments dating from later periods included corridors and some designs inspired by cosmology. Pyramidal structures from the 16th century feature the use of minarets topped with floral motifs in a style unique to tombs dating from the Turkic Trakhan dynasty. Structures from the 17th century at the Leilo Sheikh part of the cemetery feature large tombs that resemble Jain temples from afar, with prominent influence from the nearby region of Gujarat.

Several of the larger tombs feature carvings of animals, warriors, and weaponry – a practice uncommon to Muslim funerary monuments. Later tombs at the site are sometimes made entirely of brick, with only a sandstone slab. The largest structures in the most archetypal Chaukhandi style feature domed yellow sandstone canopies that were plastered white with wooden doorways, in a style that reflects Central Asian and Persian influences. The size of the dome denoted the prominence of the buried individual, with undersides embellished with carved floral patterns. The underside of some canopies feature lotus flowers, a symbol commonly associated with Hinduism.

They also feature extensive blue tile-work typical of Sindh. The use of funerary pavilions eventually expanded beyond lower Sindh, and influenced funerary architecture in neighbouring Gujarat. The Chaukhandi tombs are embellished with geometrical designs and motifs, including figural representations such as mounted horsemen, hunting scenes, arms, and jewelry.

Apart from tombs, Ranikot Fort and Kot Diji Fort are also a good example of Sindhi architecture.

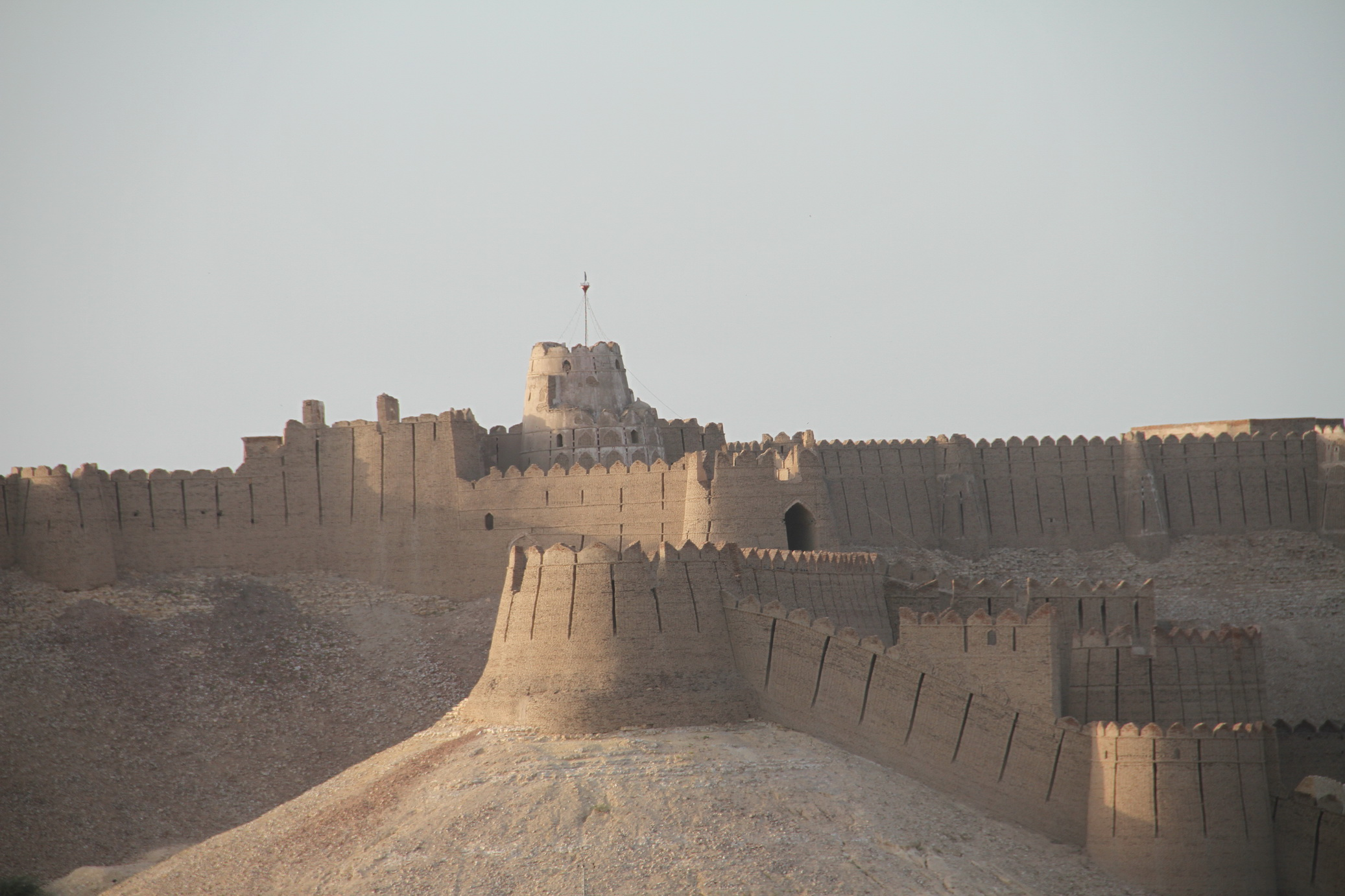
Kot Diji Fort in Sindh

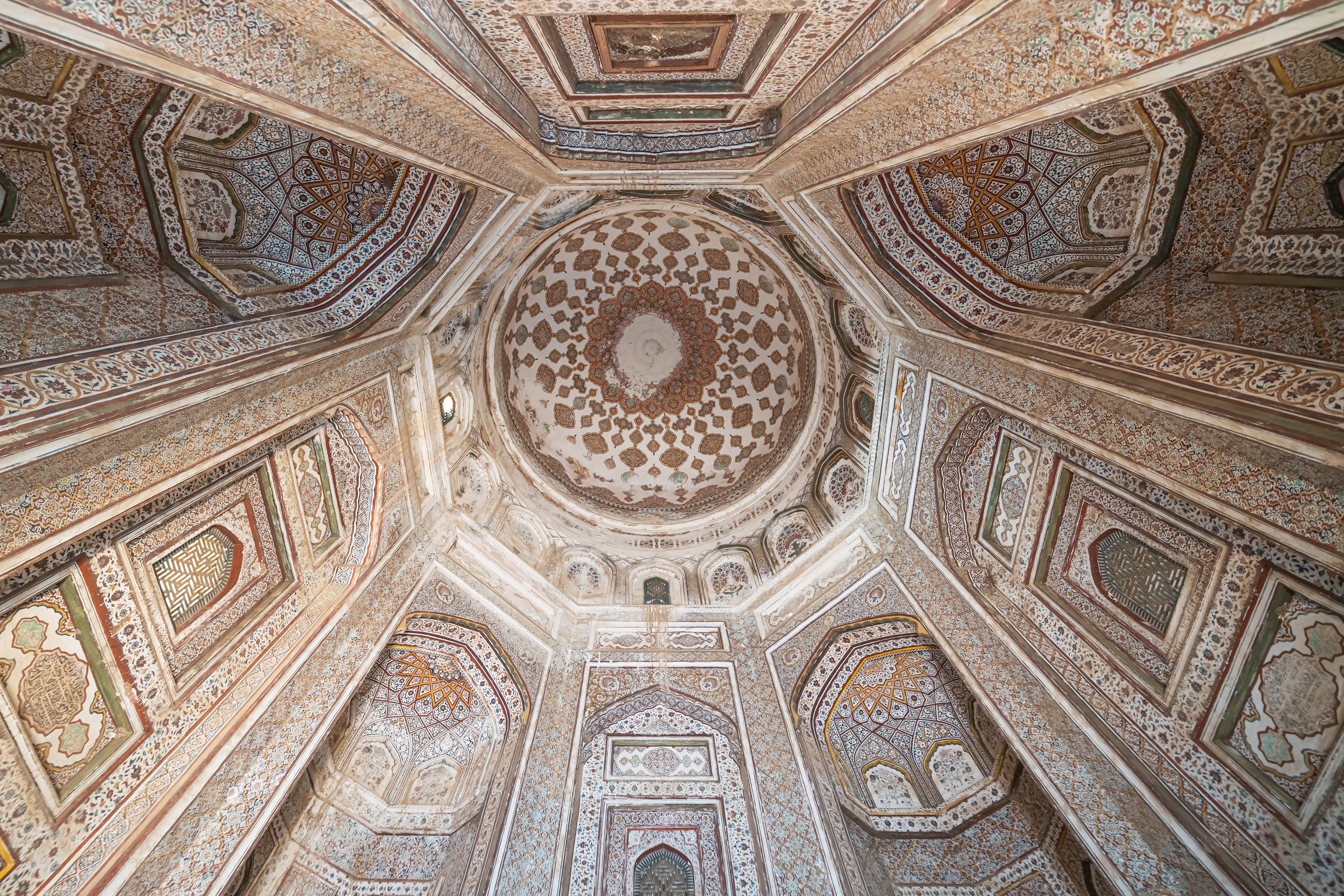
Interior of one of the Talpur tombs

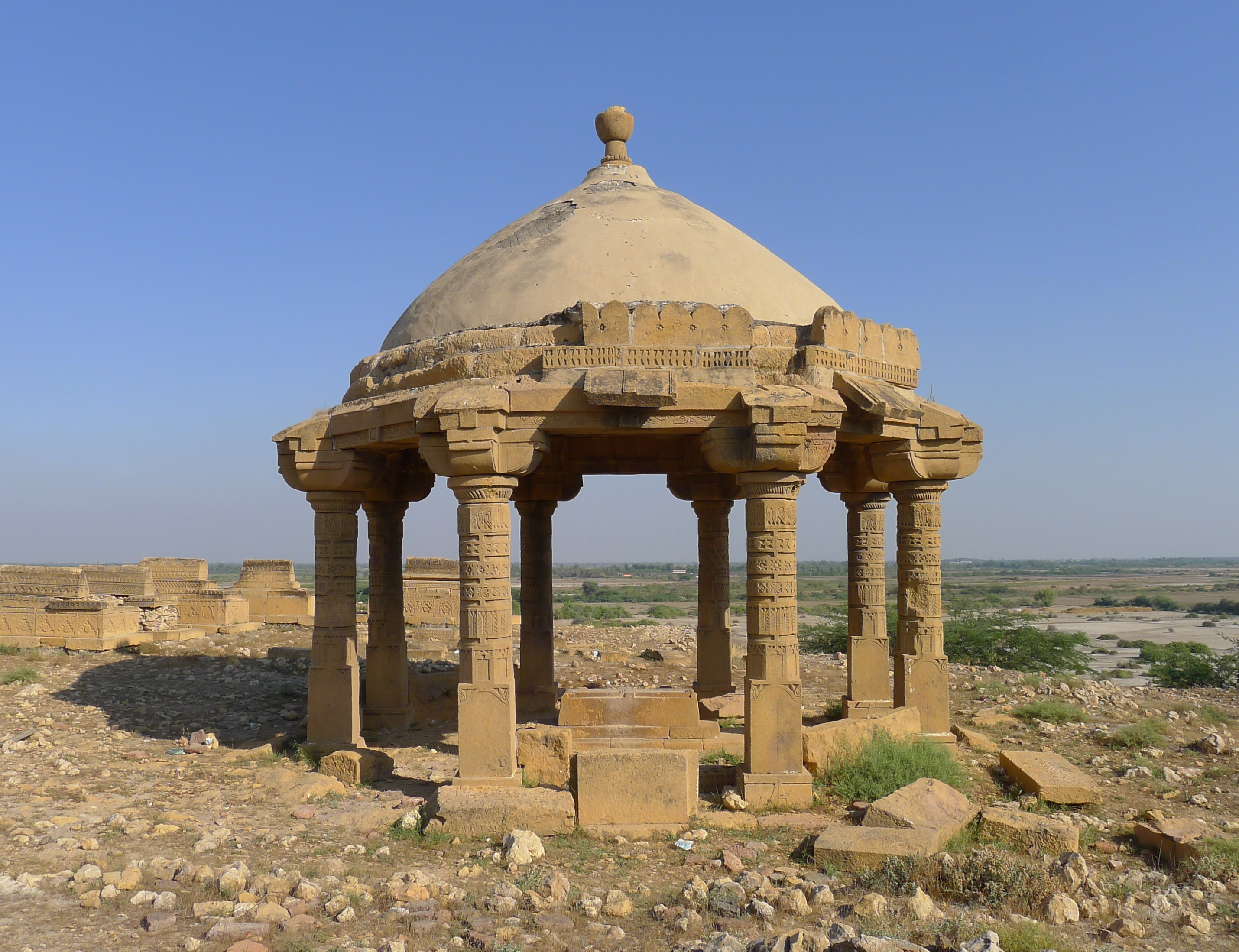
Canopy tomb of Daya Khan Rahu

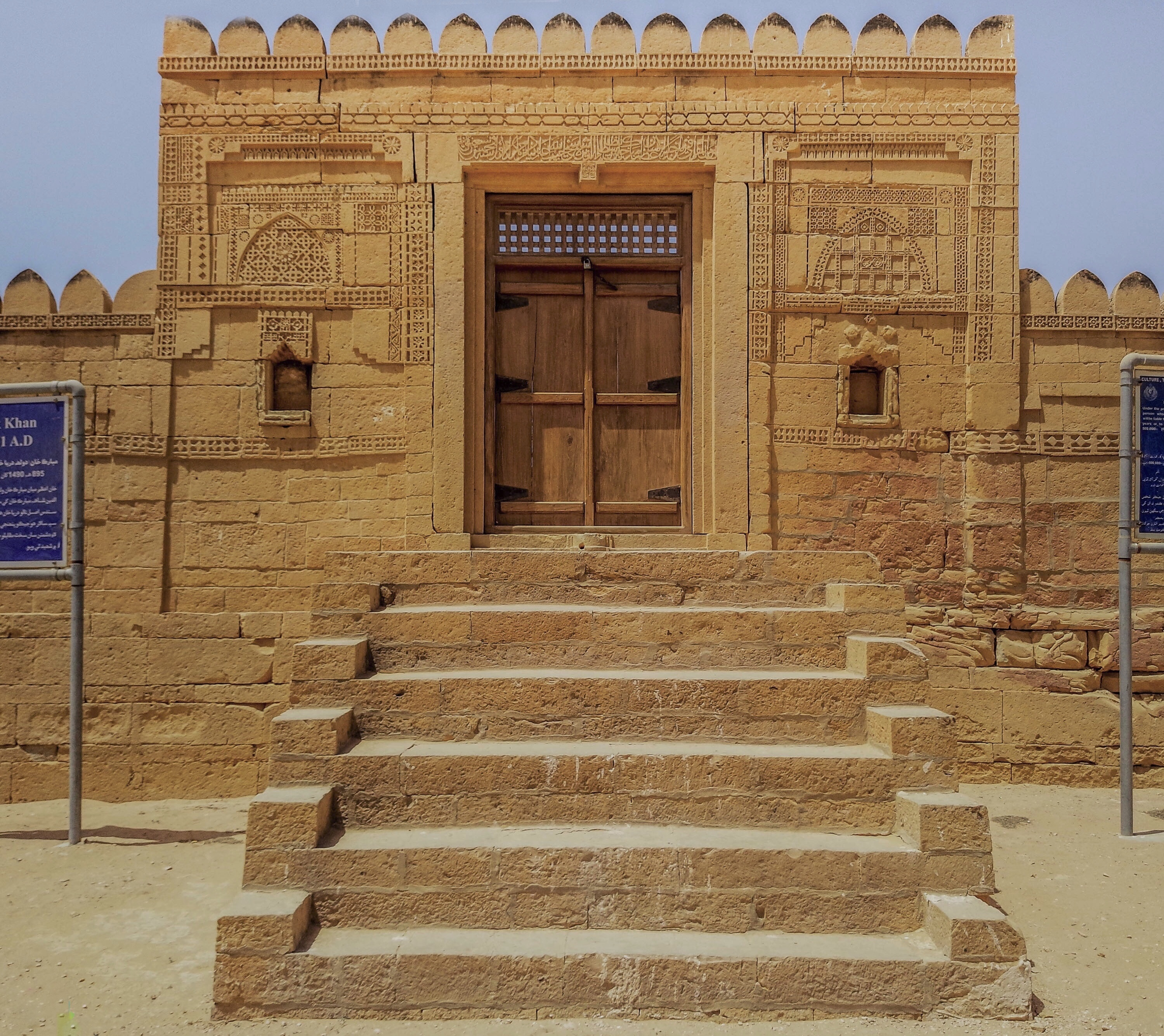
View of Tomb of Jam Mubarak Khan

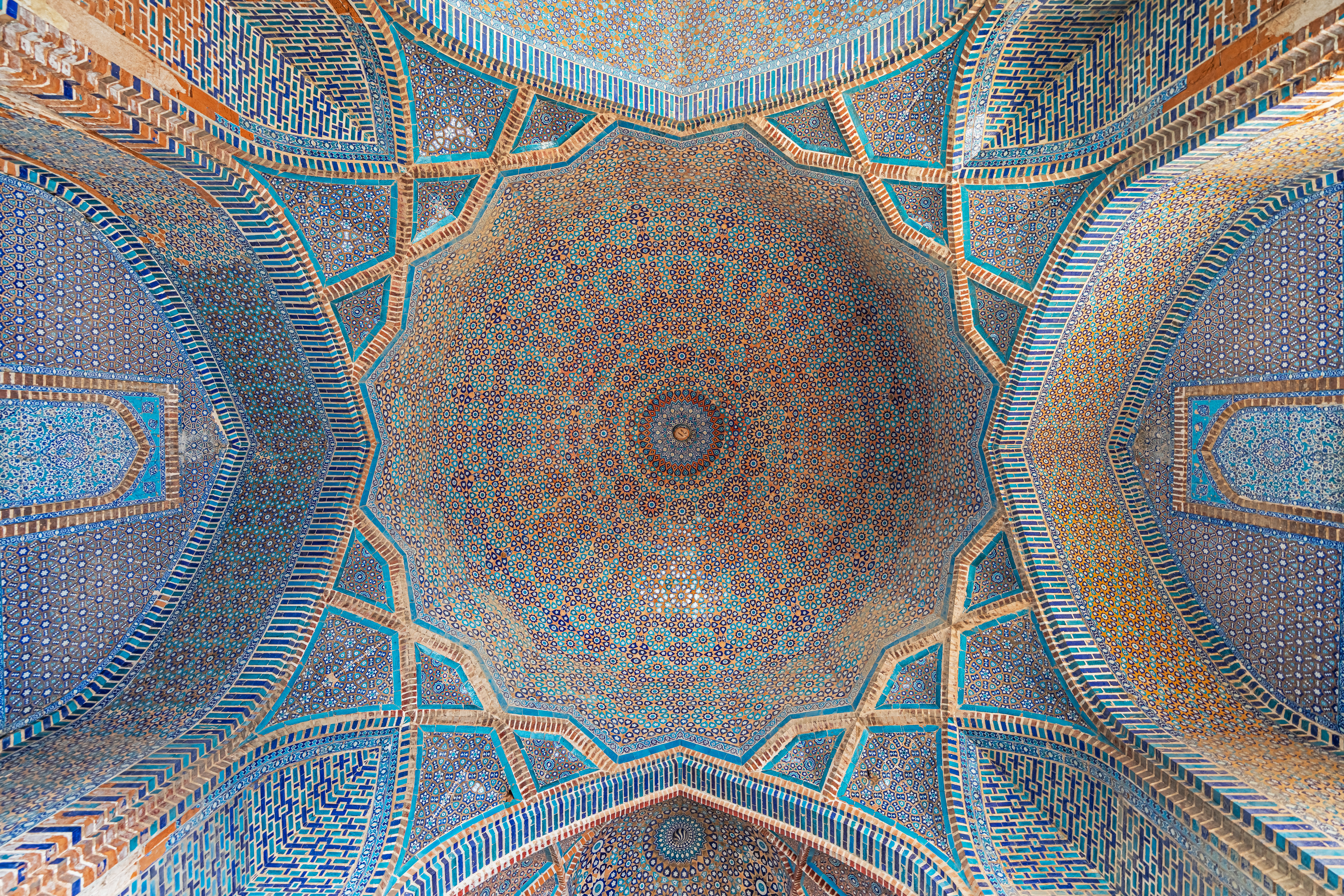
The Shah Jahan mosque's main dome has tiles arranged in a stellate pattern to represent the night sky

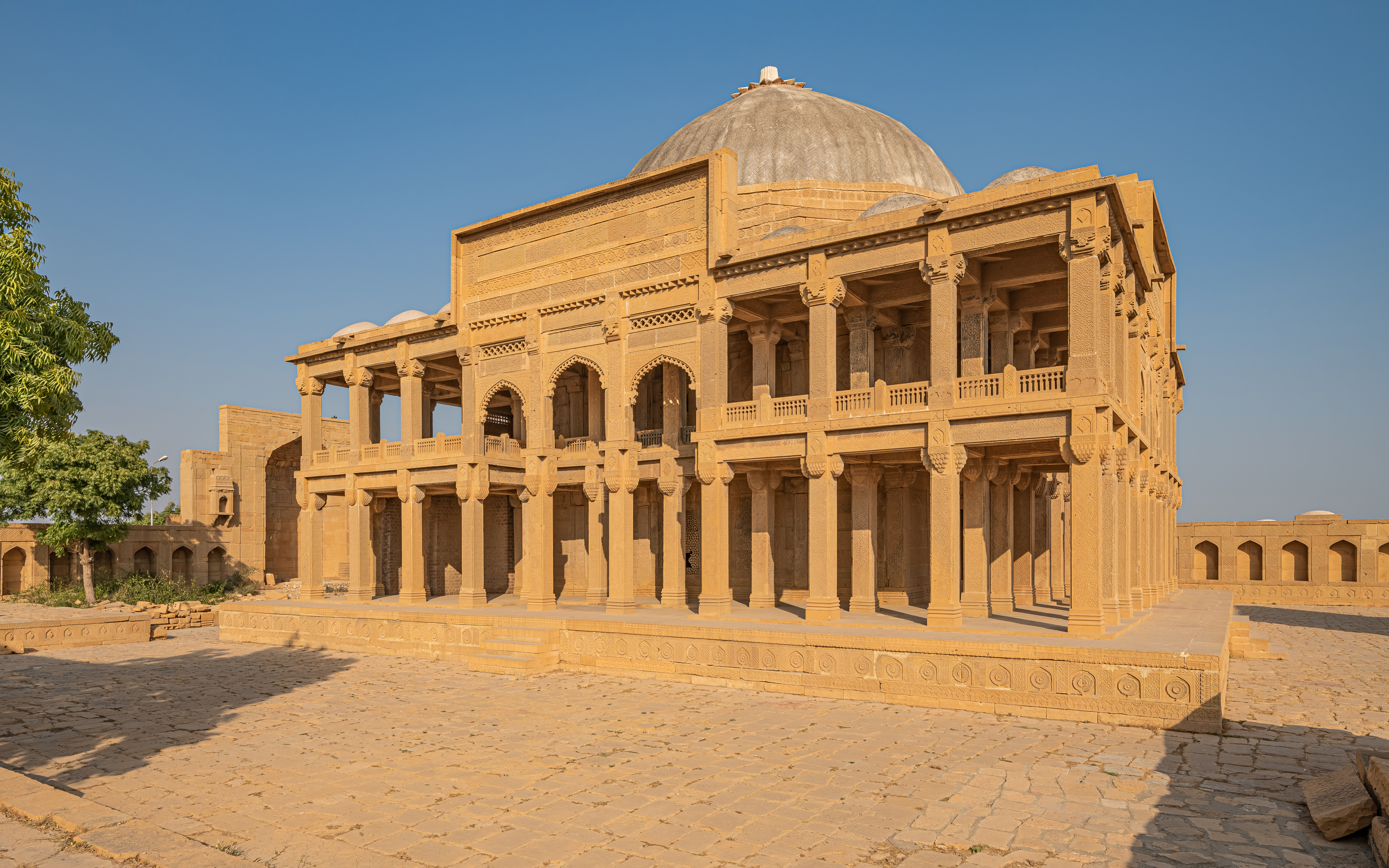
Makli Necropolis features several monumental tombs dating from the 14th to 18th centuries

==== Architecture of Multan ====
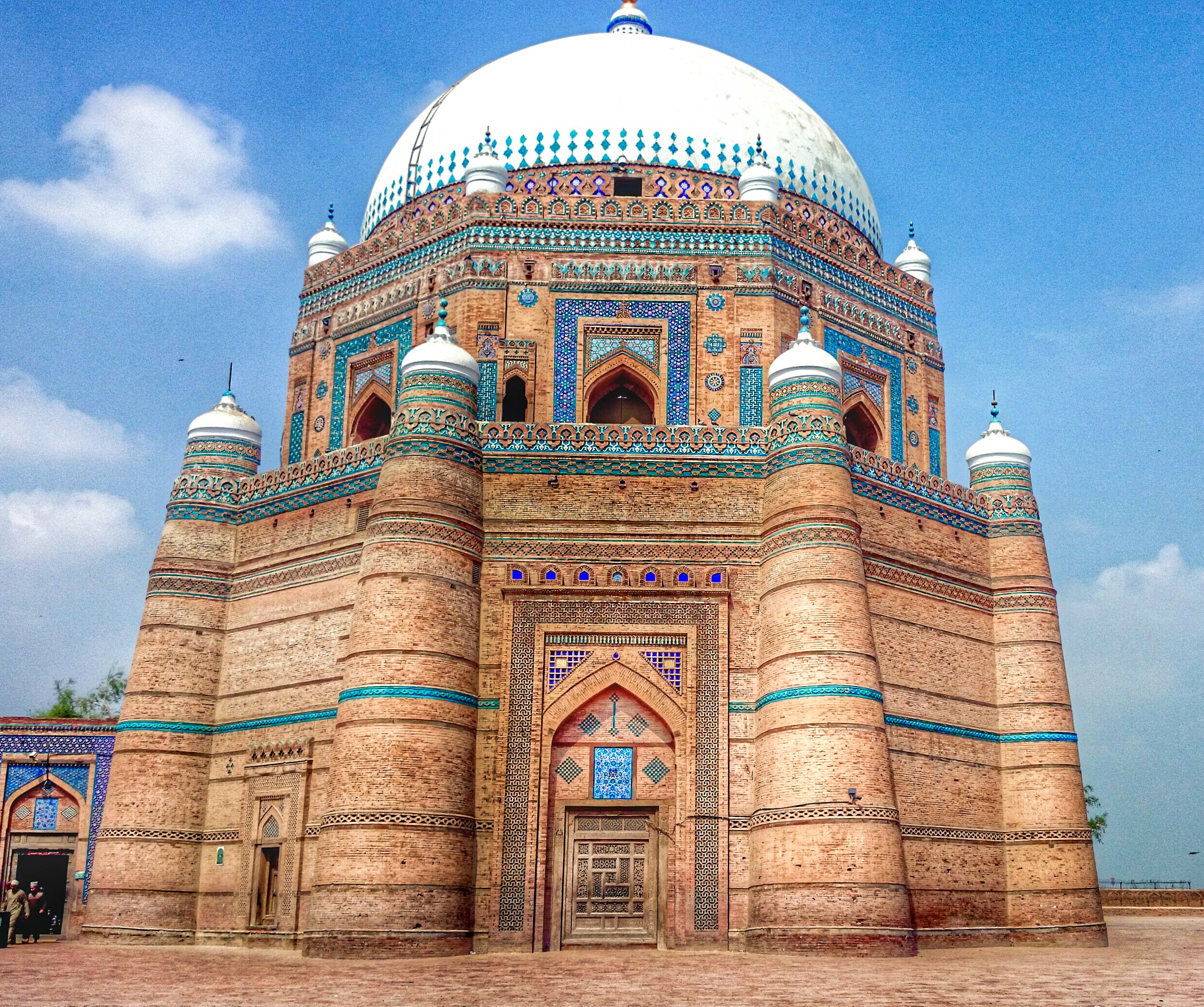
Tomb of Shah Rukn-e-Alam Multan

A distinct Multani style of architecture began taking root in the 14th century with the establishment of funerary monuments, and is characterized by large brick walls reinforced by wooden anchors, with inward sloping roofs. Funerary architecture is also reflected in the city's residential quarters, which borrow architectural and decorative elements from Multan's mausolea.

In spite of being in Punjab, the architecture of city of Multan is more influenced by the architecture of the neighbouring province of Sindh. It is usually expressed in the form of mausoleums of Sufi saints.

=== Rajput architecture ===
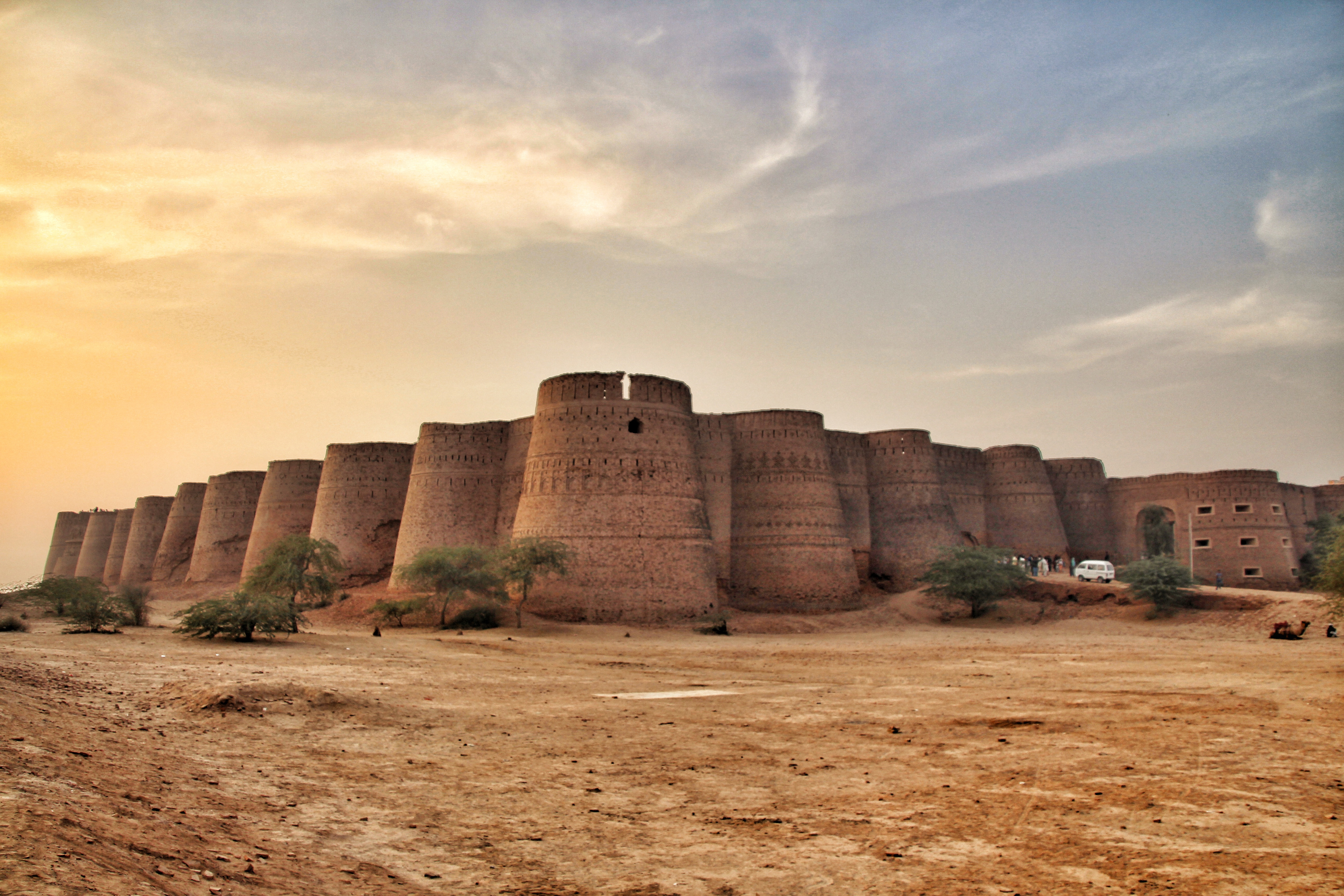
Derawer fort in Cholistan, an example of Rajput architecture

The Rajput architecture makes an extensive use of Jalis, Chatris and Jharokhas. All these features also have influenced Mughal architecture. The forts of Derawar and Umerkot were built by Rajput clans during the medieval era, and are examples of early Rajput architecture.

=== Sikh architecture ===
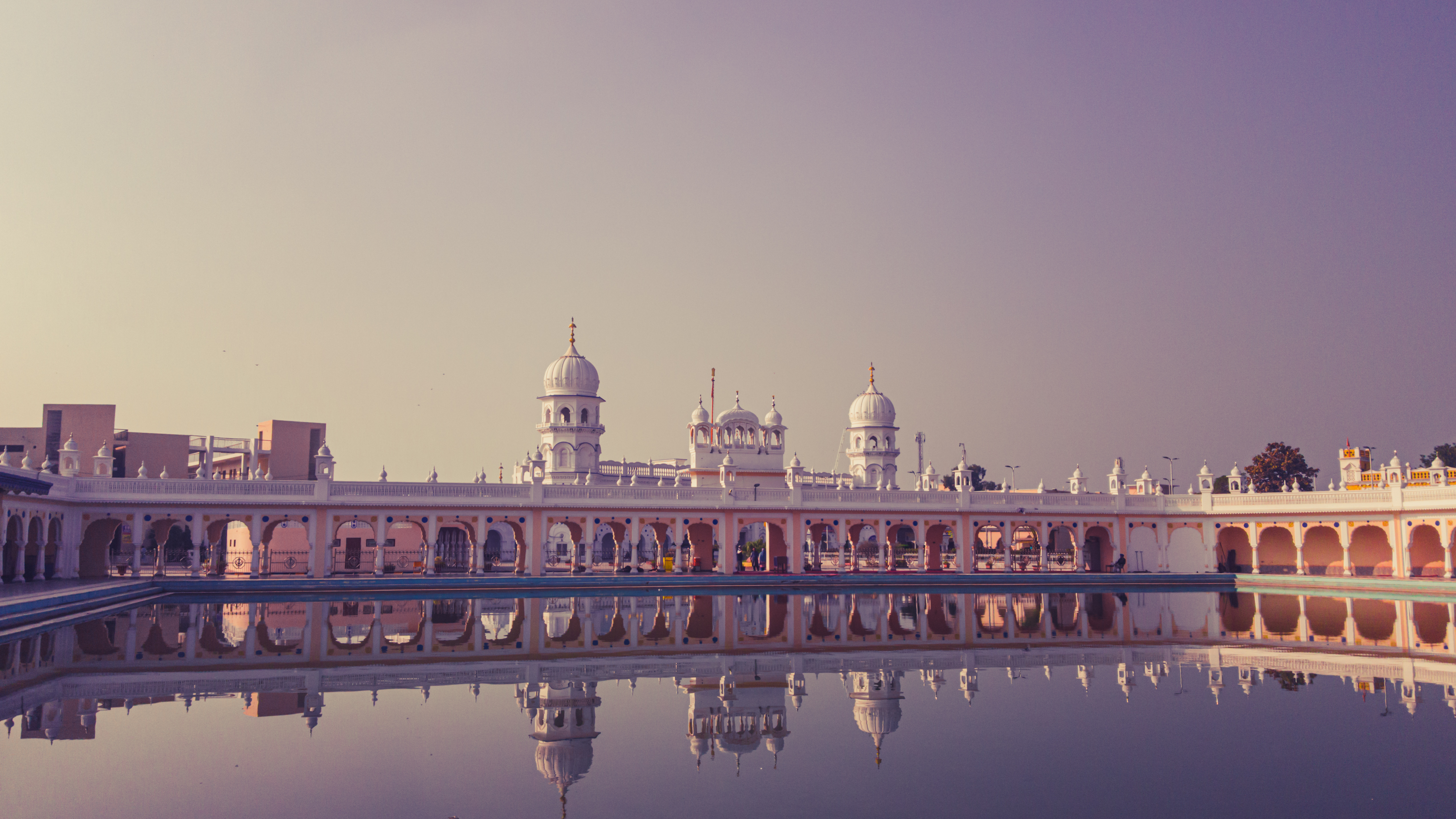
The Gurdwara Janam Asthan in Nankana Sahib, Pakistan, commemorates the site where Guru Nanak is believed to have been born. It was rebuilt by the Pakistani Government

Sikh architecture is a style of architecture that was developed under Sikh Empire during 18th and 19th century in the Punjab region. Named after Sikhism, a religion native to Punjab, Sikh architecture is heavily influenced by Mughal architecture and Islamic styles. The onion dome, frescoes, in-lay work, and multi-foil arches, are Mughal influences, more specially from Shah Jahan's period, whereas chattris, oriel windows, bracket supported eaves at the string-course, and ornamented friezes are derived from elements of Rajput architecture.

One of the most well known examples of Sikh architecture is the Samadhi of Ranjit Singh, built in 1839. The building has gilded fluted domes and cupolas, and an ornate balustrade around the upper portion of the building. The dome is decorated with Naga (serpent) hood designs - the product of Hindu craftsmen that worked on the project. The wooden panels on the ceiling are decorated with stained glass work, while the walls are richly decorated with floral designs. The ceilings are decorated with glass mosaic work.

Gurdwara Dera Sahib and Gurdwara Panja Sahib are other prominent examples.

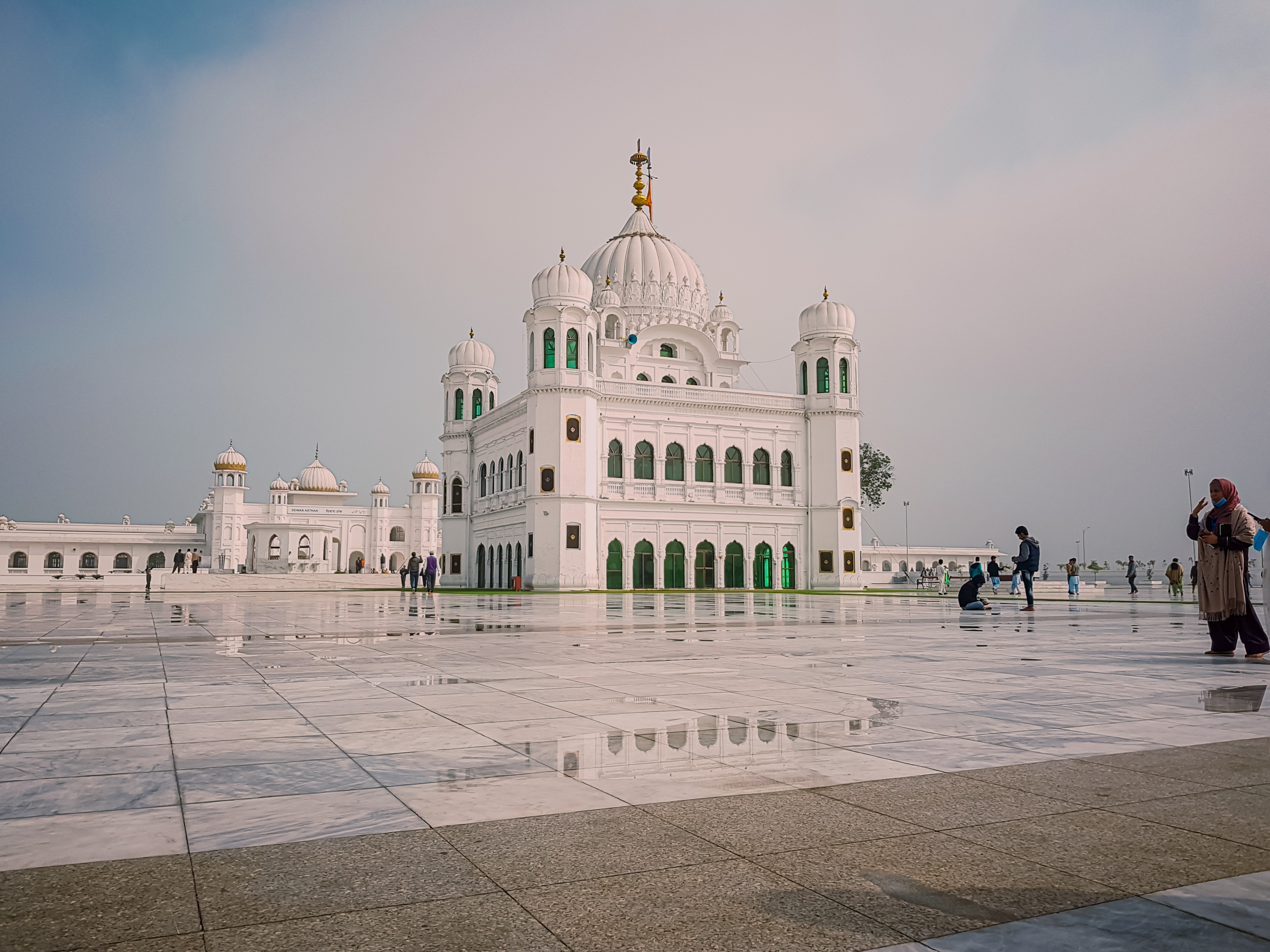
Darbar Sahib, gurdwara commemorating Guru Nanak, in Kartarpur, Pakistan

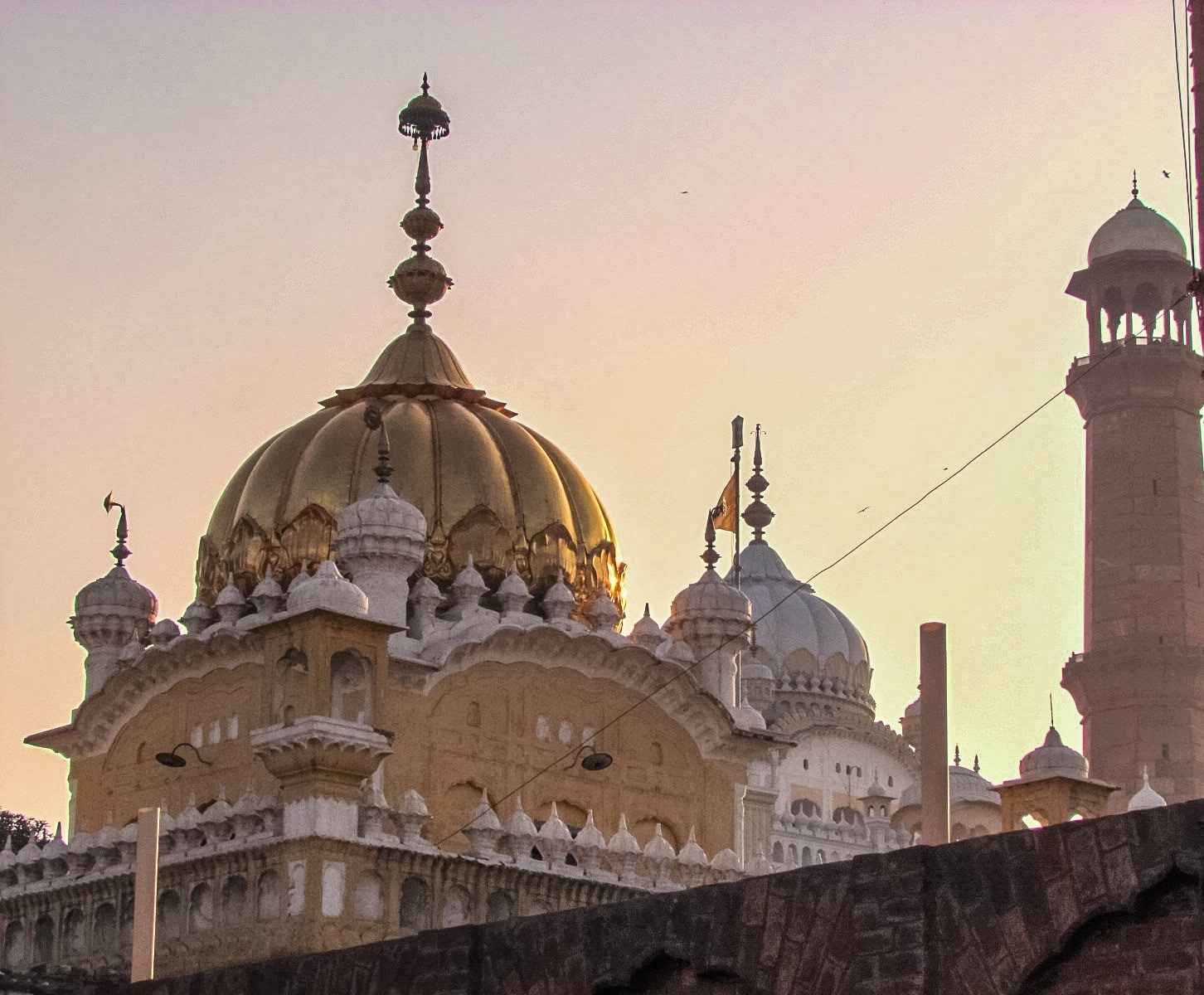
Golden dome of Gurdwara Dera Sahib in Lahore

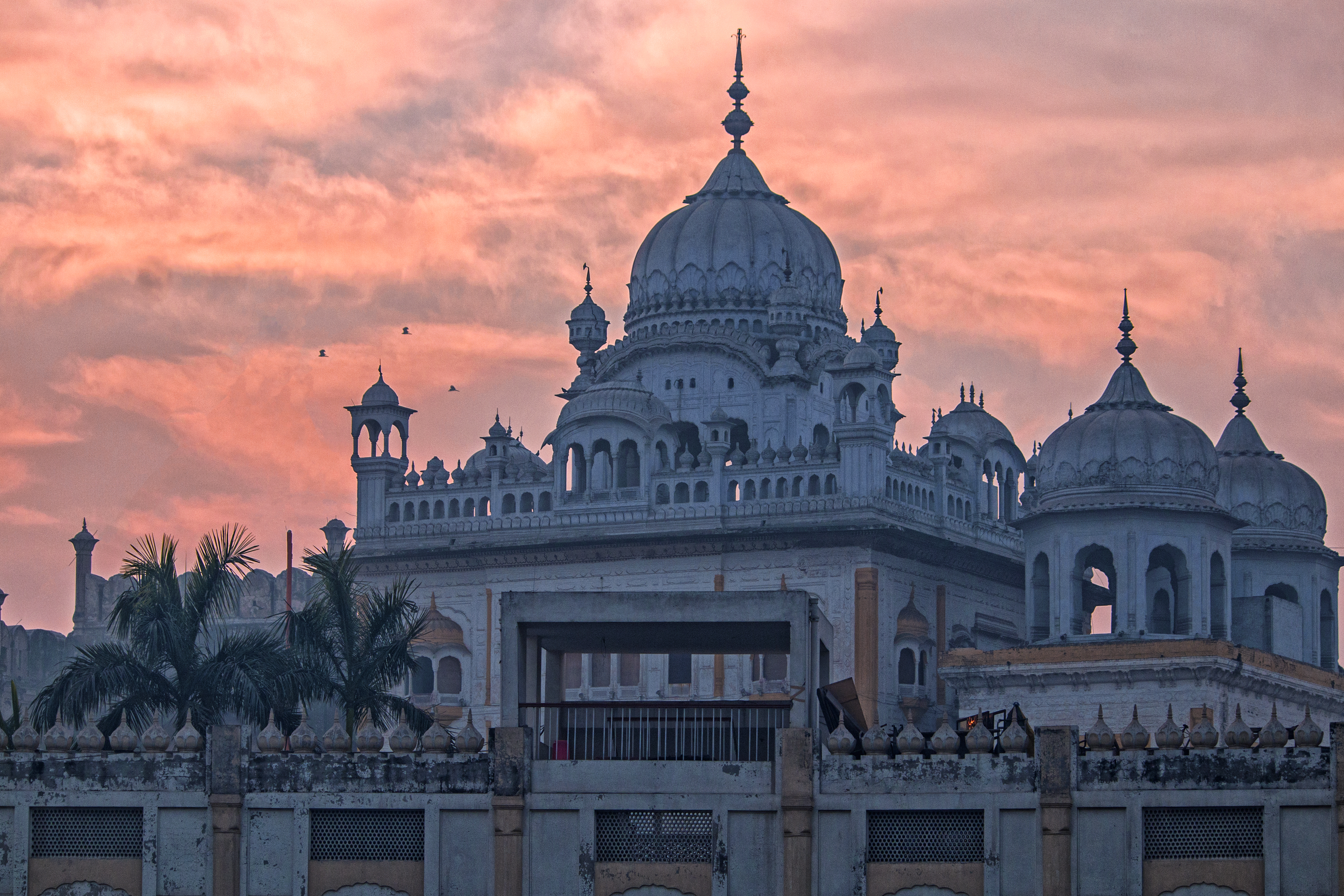
Samadhi of Ranjit Singh in Lahore, an example of Sikh architecture in Pakistan

== Indo-Saracenic architecture ==
During the British Raj, European architectural styles such as baroque, gothic and neoclassical became more predominant. The Frere Hall, St. Patrick's Cathedral and Mereweather Clock Tower in Karachi, and neoclassical Montgomery Hall in Lahore are some examples.

A new style of architecture known as Indo-Saracenic revival style developed, from a mixture of European and Indo-Islamic components. Among the more prominent works are seen in the cities of Karachi (Mohatta Palace, Karachi Metropolitan Corporation Building), in Peshawar (Islamia College University) and Lahore (Lahore Museum, University of the Punjab and King Edward Medical University).

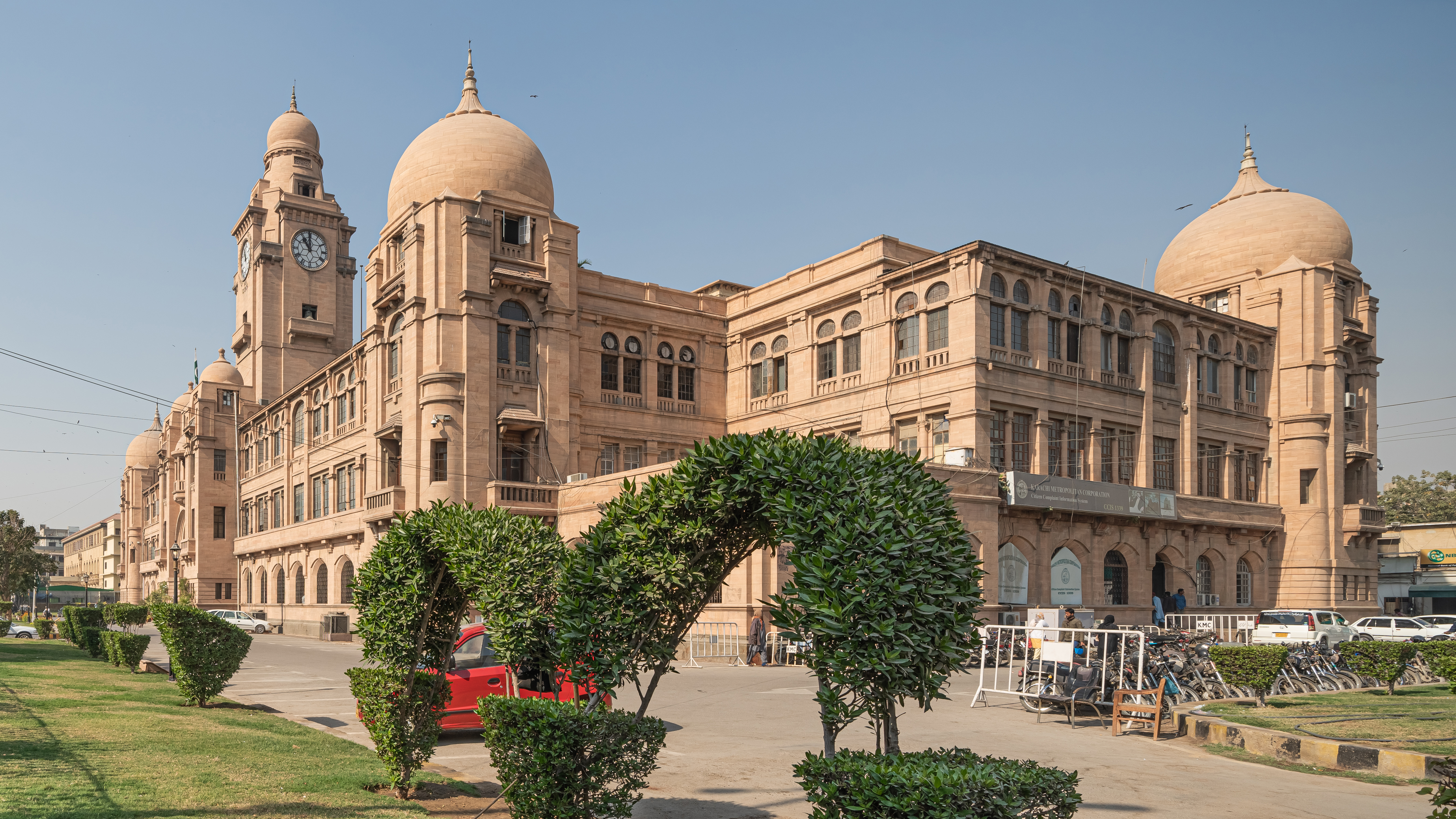
Karachi Metropolitan Corporation Building, Karachi

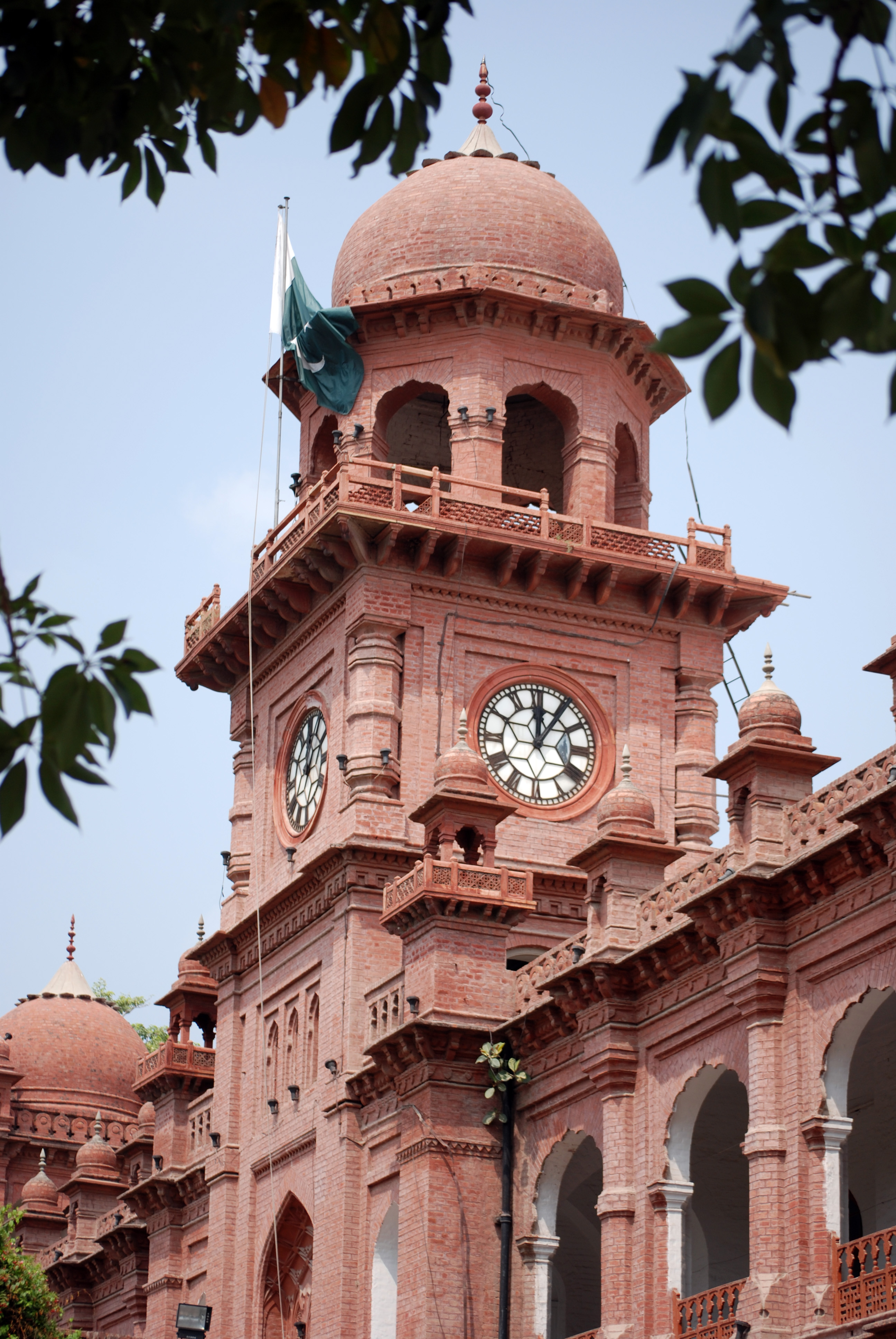
University of the Punjab, Lahore

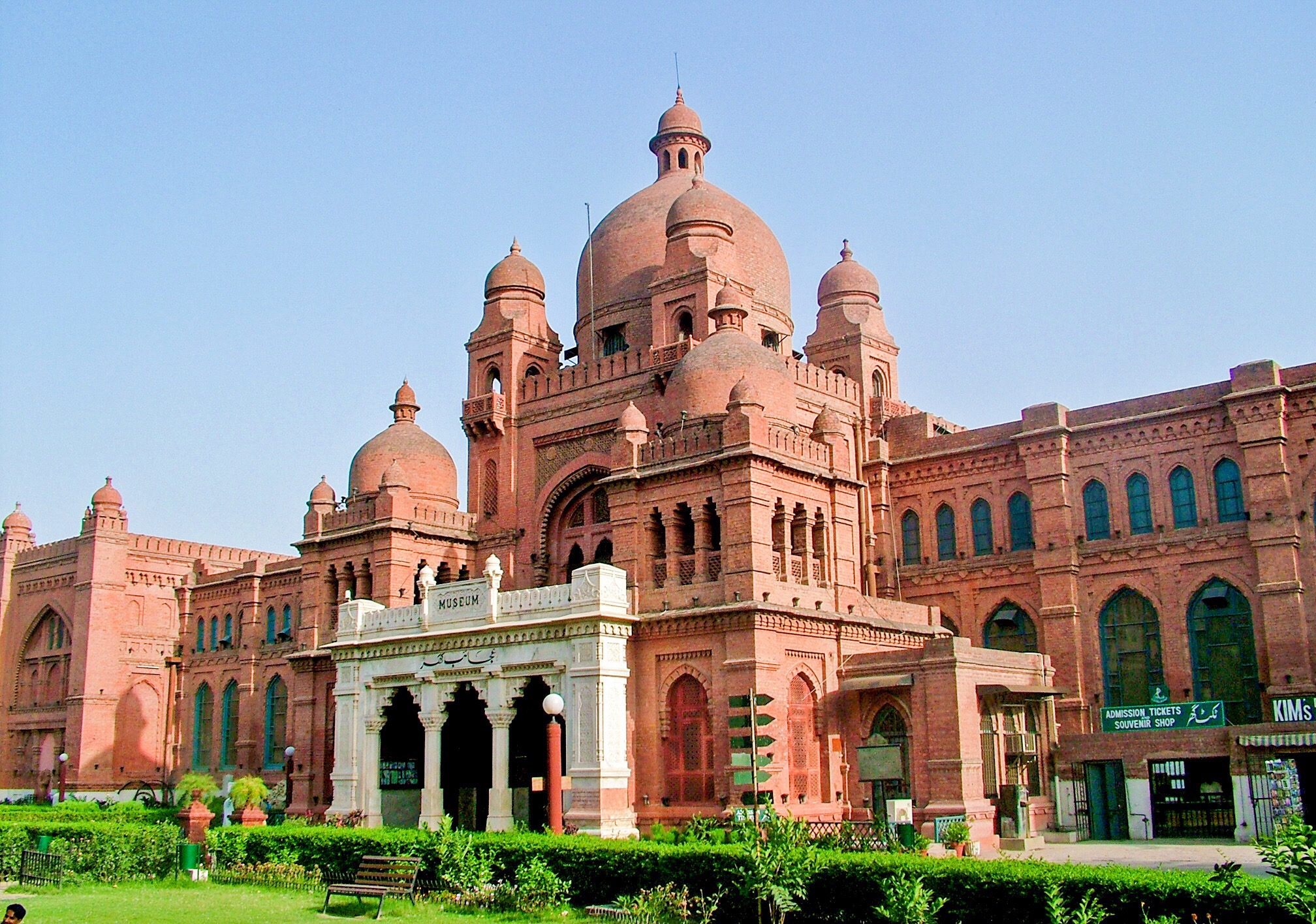
The present building of the Lahore Museum was designed by Sir Ganga Ram and completed in 1894

== Post-Independence ==
National Monuments of Pakistan

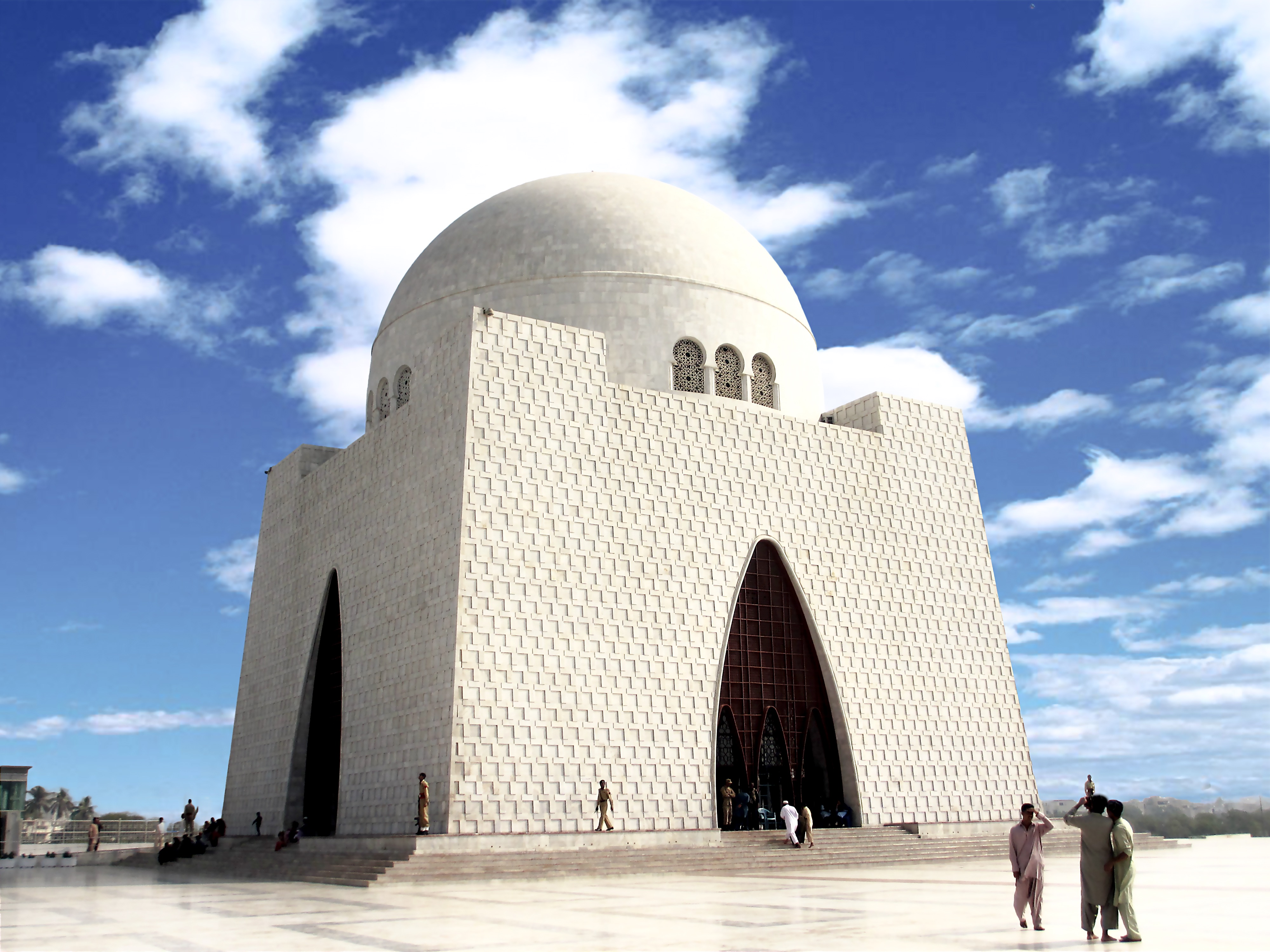
Mazar-e-Quaid, the mausoleum of Muhammad Ali Jinnah in Karachi.

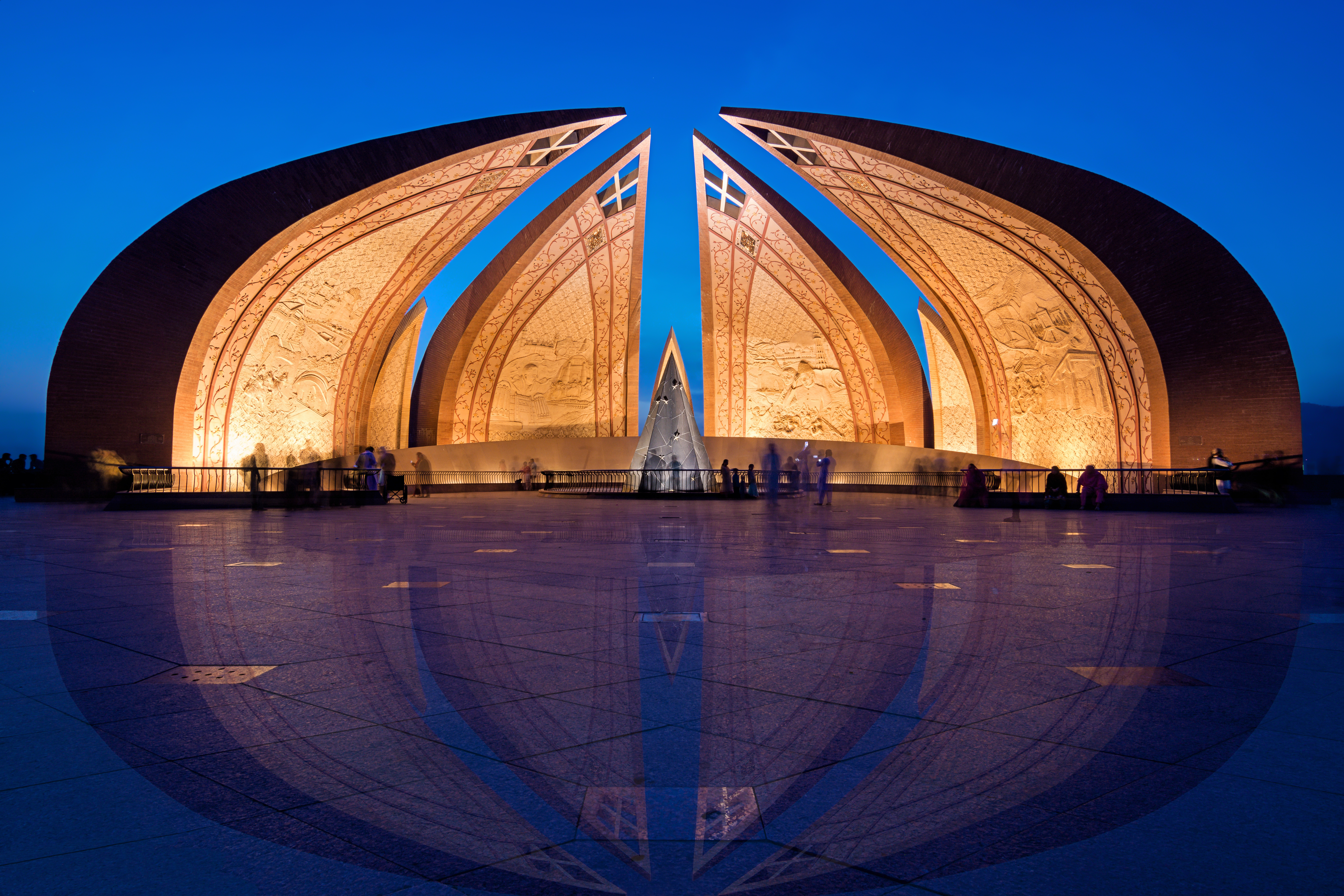
Pakistan Monument in Islamabad, built in the shape of a blooming flower. The petals represent the provinces and territories of Pakistan.

After independence, the architecture of Pakistan is a blend of historic Islamic and various modern styles.

This reflects itself, particularly in modern structures. In addition, buildings of monumental importance such as the Minar-e-Pakistan in Lahore or the mausoleum established with white marble known as Mazar-e-Quaid for the founder of the state expressed the self-confidence of the nascent state.

The city of Islamabad was designed by Greek architect Constantinos Apostolou Doxiadis and completed in 1966. The Faisal Mosque in Islamabad, one of the largest mosques in the world, is one of the best examples of modern Islamic architecture. It was designed by Vedat Dalokay and constructed between 1976 and 1986.

In 1980 the Heritage Foundation Pakistan was founded to help conserve the traditional Architecture of Pakistan. Focused mainly on conserving traditional Sindhi architecture, the foundation is also the push behind the emergence of a contemporary architectural tradition that utilizes vernacular Sindhi building techniques in concert with new building techniques. It can be seen as the starting point of the Neo-vernacular movement in Pakistan, or at least the Sindh region. Designs by Yasmeen Lari, such as the Malki Zero Carbon Cultural Centre and Green Karavan Ghar are examples. The logic behind the movement includes that this way of building is both participatory, with locals being able to participate in the physical construction, and also better suited for the environment, being better resistant against floods and earthquakes.

The National Monument in Islamabad, built in 2007 is in the shape of a blooming flower. The four main petals of the monument represent the four provinces of Balochistan, Khyber-Pakhtunkhwa, Punjab, and Sindh, while the three smaller petals represent the three territories of Gilgit-Baltistan, Azad Kashmir and the Tribal Areas. (Note: Tribal Areas were merged into Khyber-Pakhtunkhwa in 2018.)

Skyscrapers built in the international style are becoming more prevalent in the cities.

== World Heritage Sites ==
There are currently six sites in Pakistan listed under the UNESCO World Heritage:

- Archaeological Ruins at Moenjodaro
- Buddhist Ruins at Takht-i-Bahi and Neighbouring City Remains at Sahr-i-Bahlol
- Lahore Fort and Shalimar Gardens (Lahore)
- Historic Monuments of Thatta
- Rohtas Fort
- Taxila

== Gallery ==
=== Mughal ===
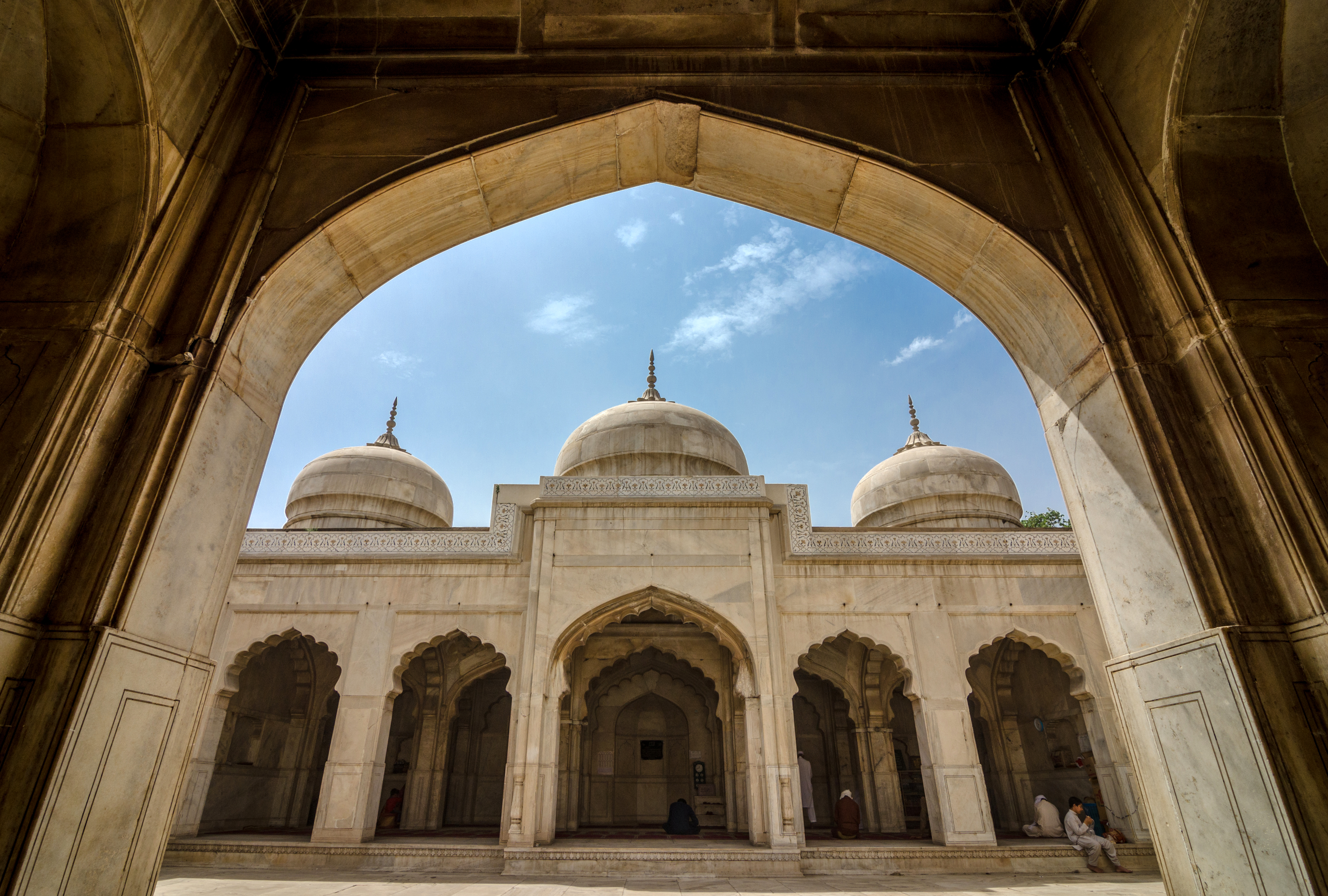
Moti Masjid located within the Lahore Fort

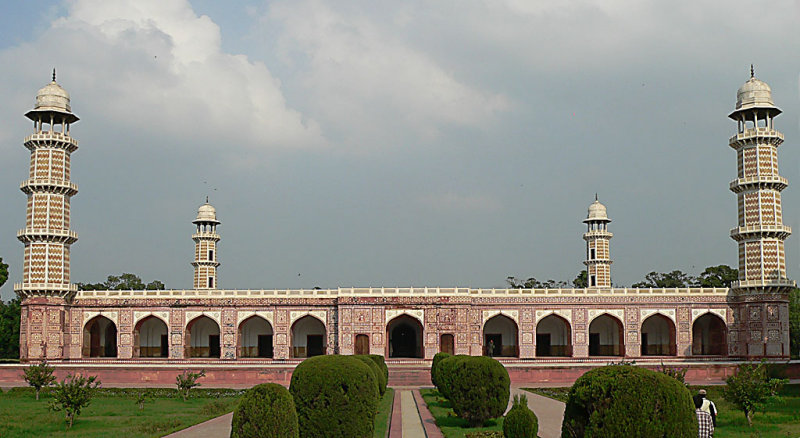
Tomb of Jahangir

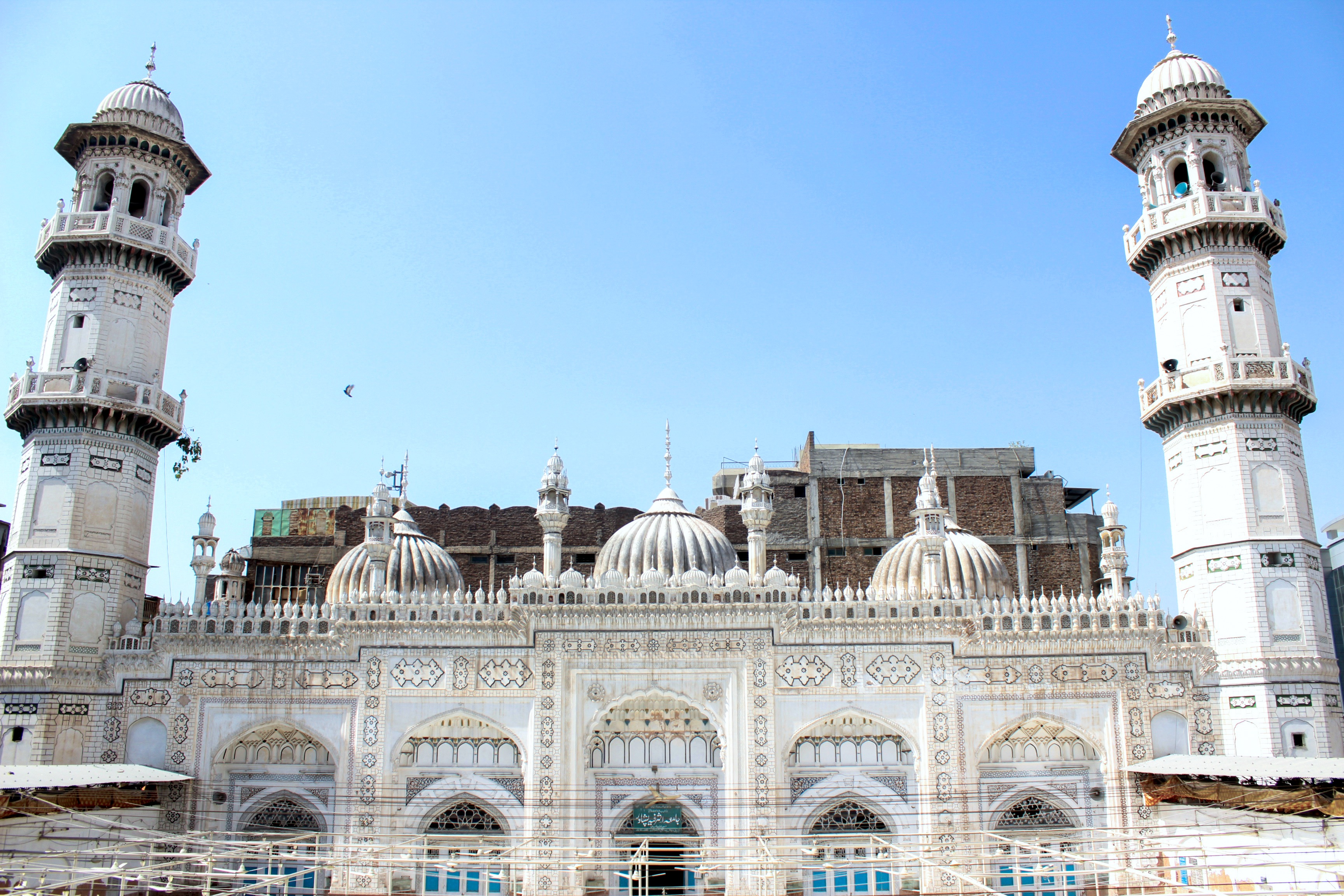
Mahabat Khan Mosque, Peshawar

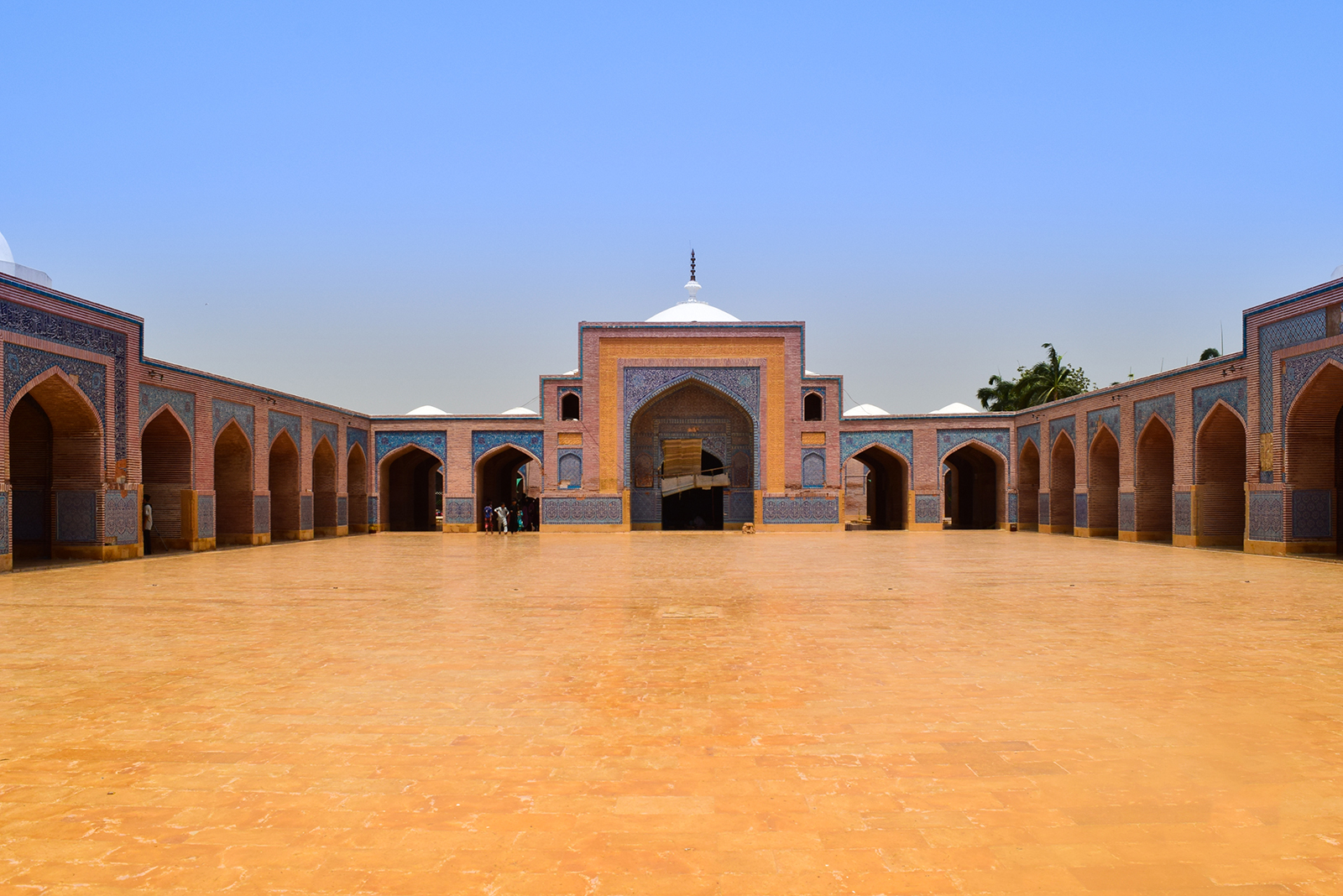
Shah Jahan Mosque in Thatta

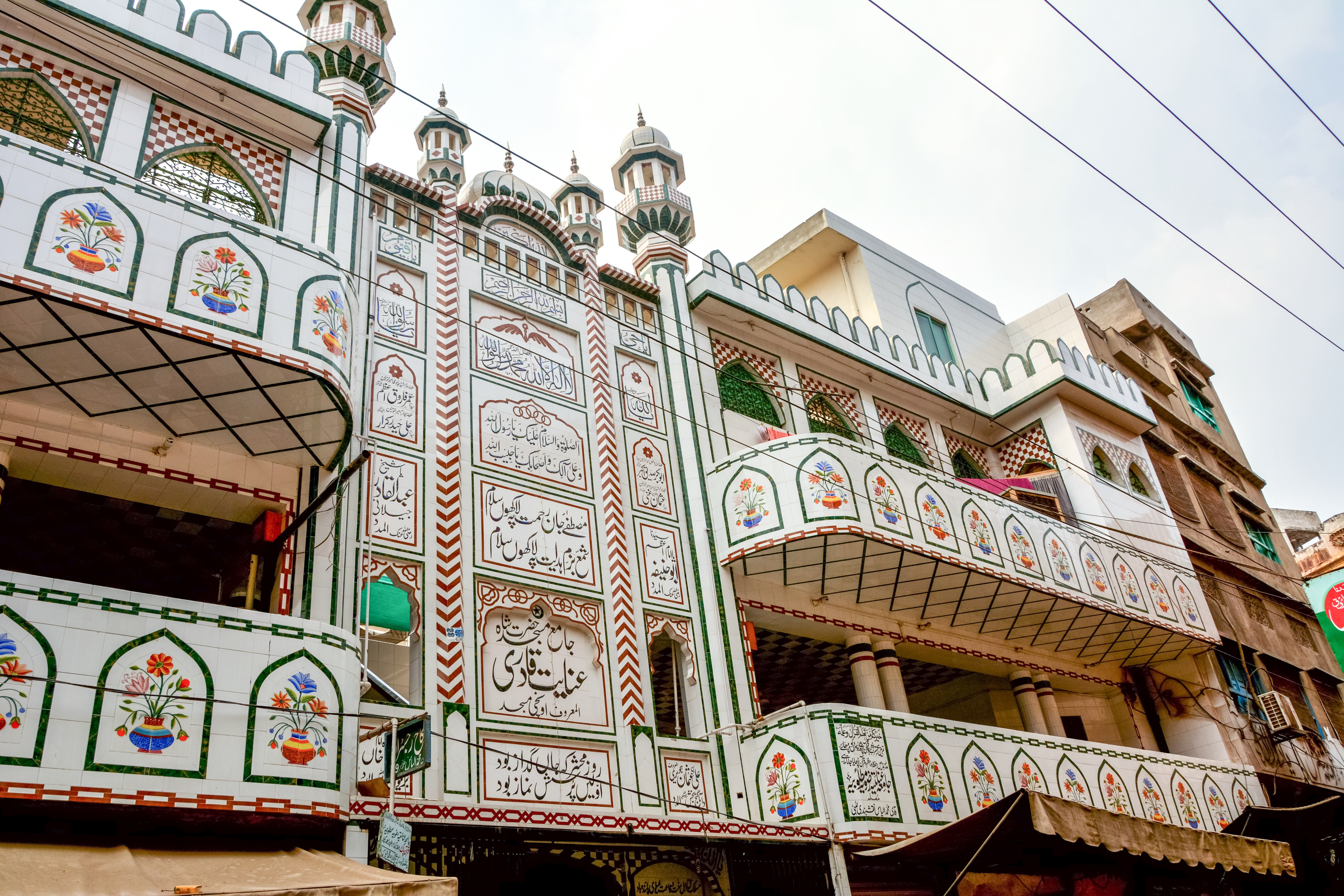
Oonchi Mosque in Lahore

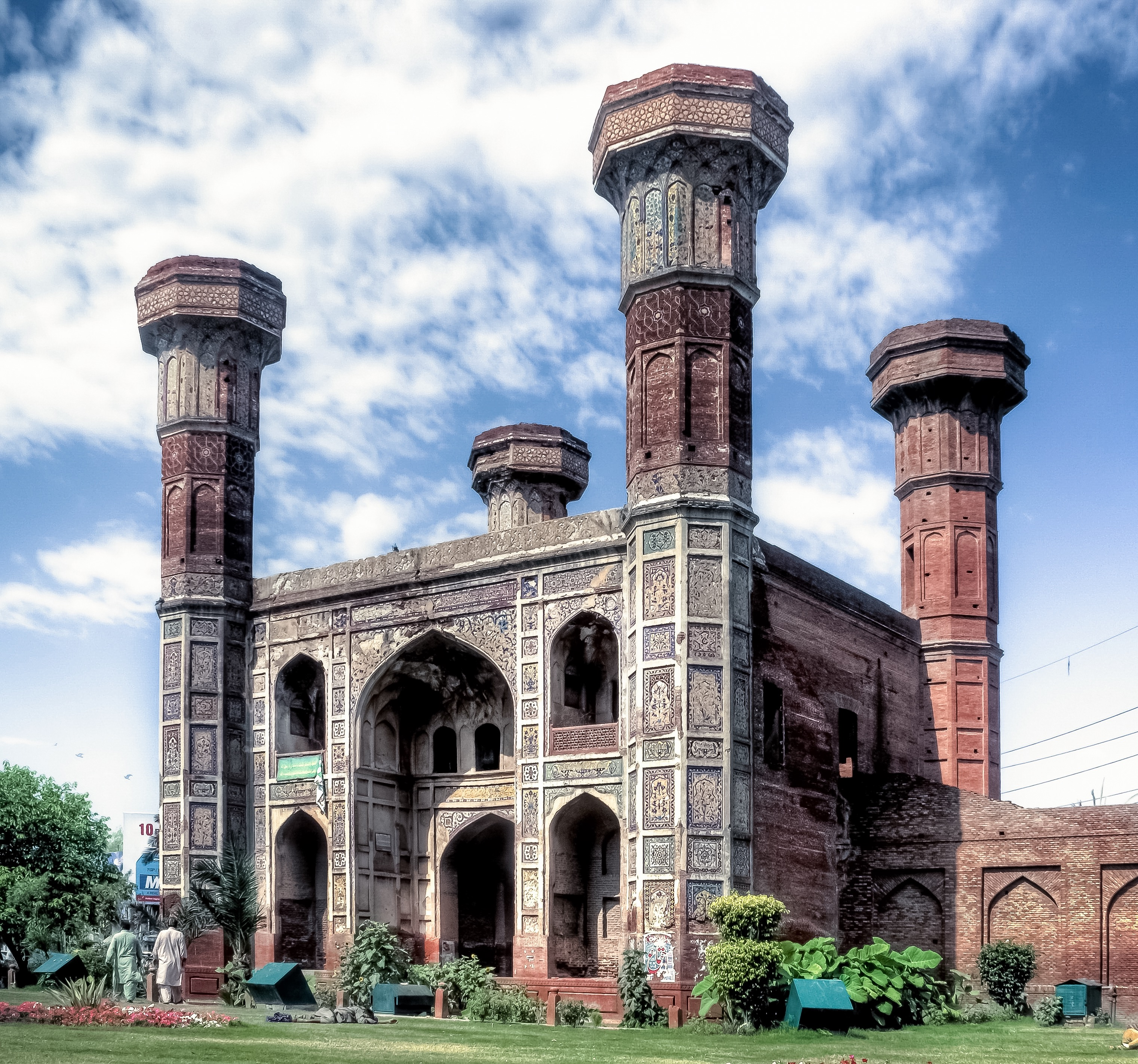
A Mughal era monument - Chauburji in Lahore

=== Indo-Saracenic ===
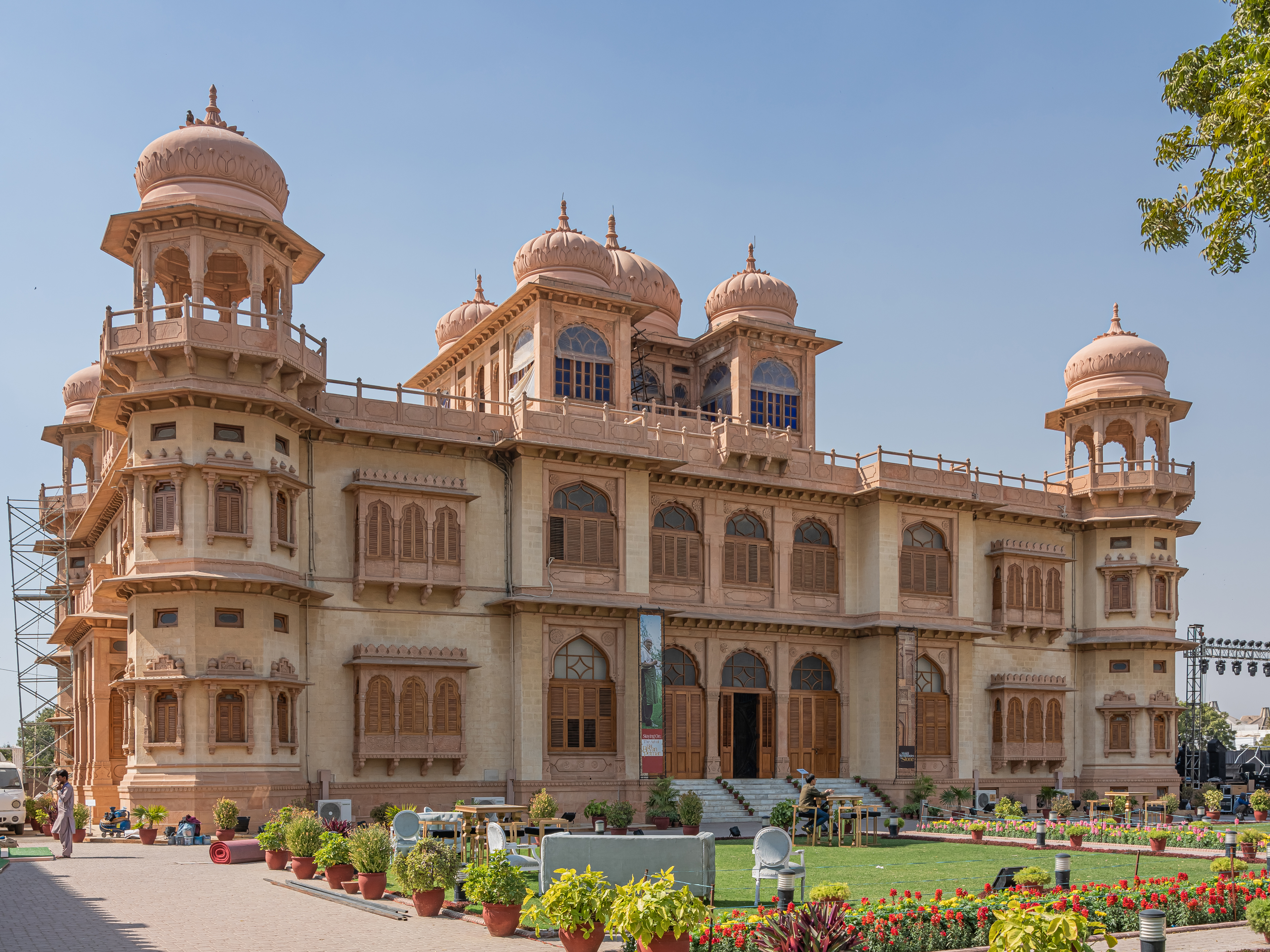
Mohatta Palace in Karachi

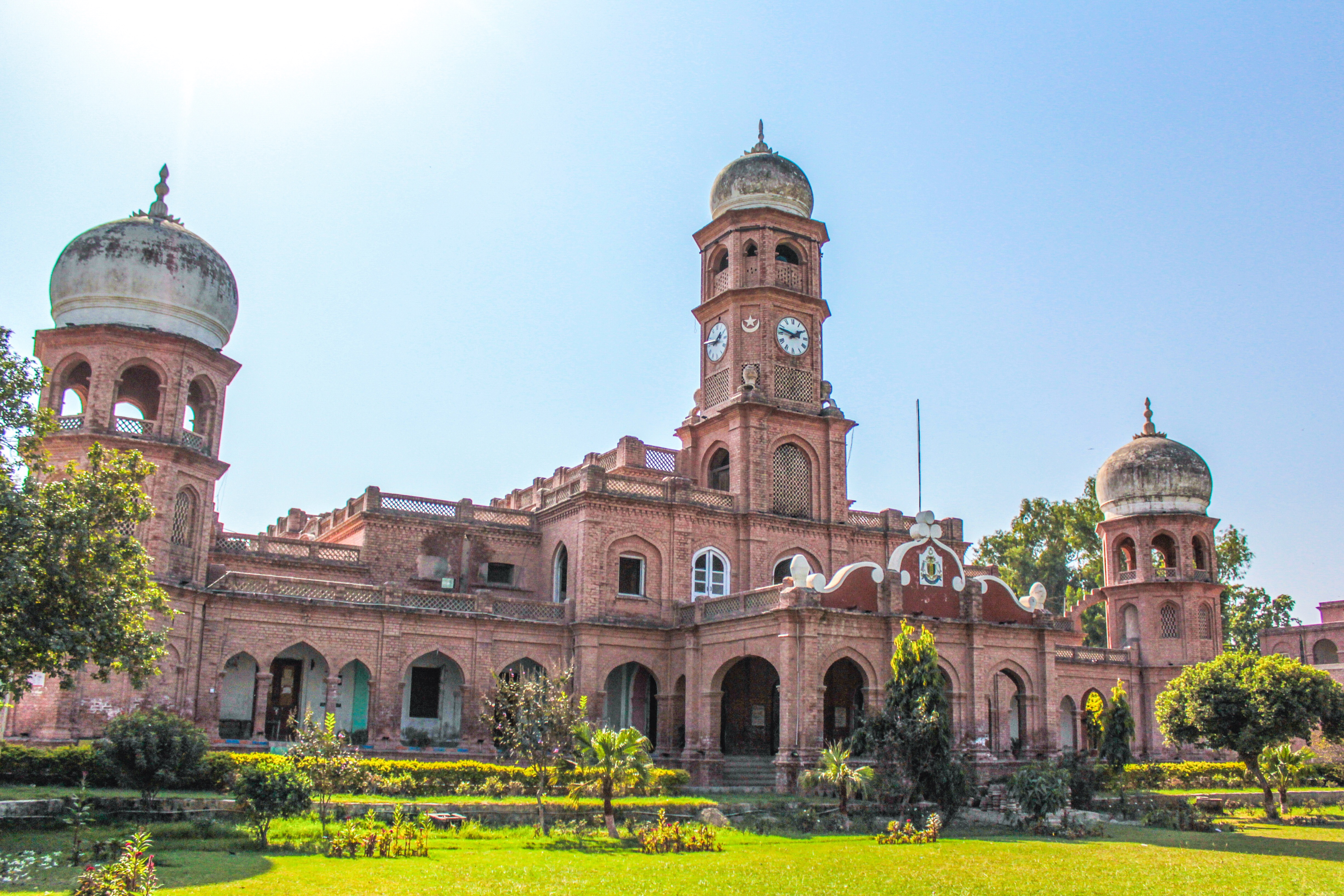
Sadiq Dane High School, Bahawalpur

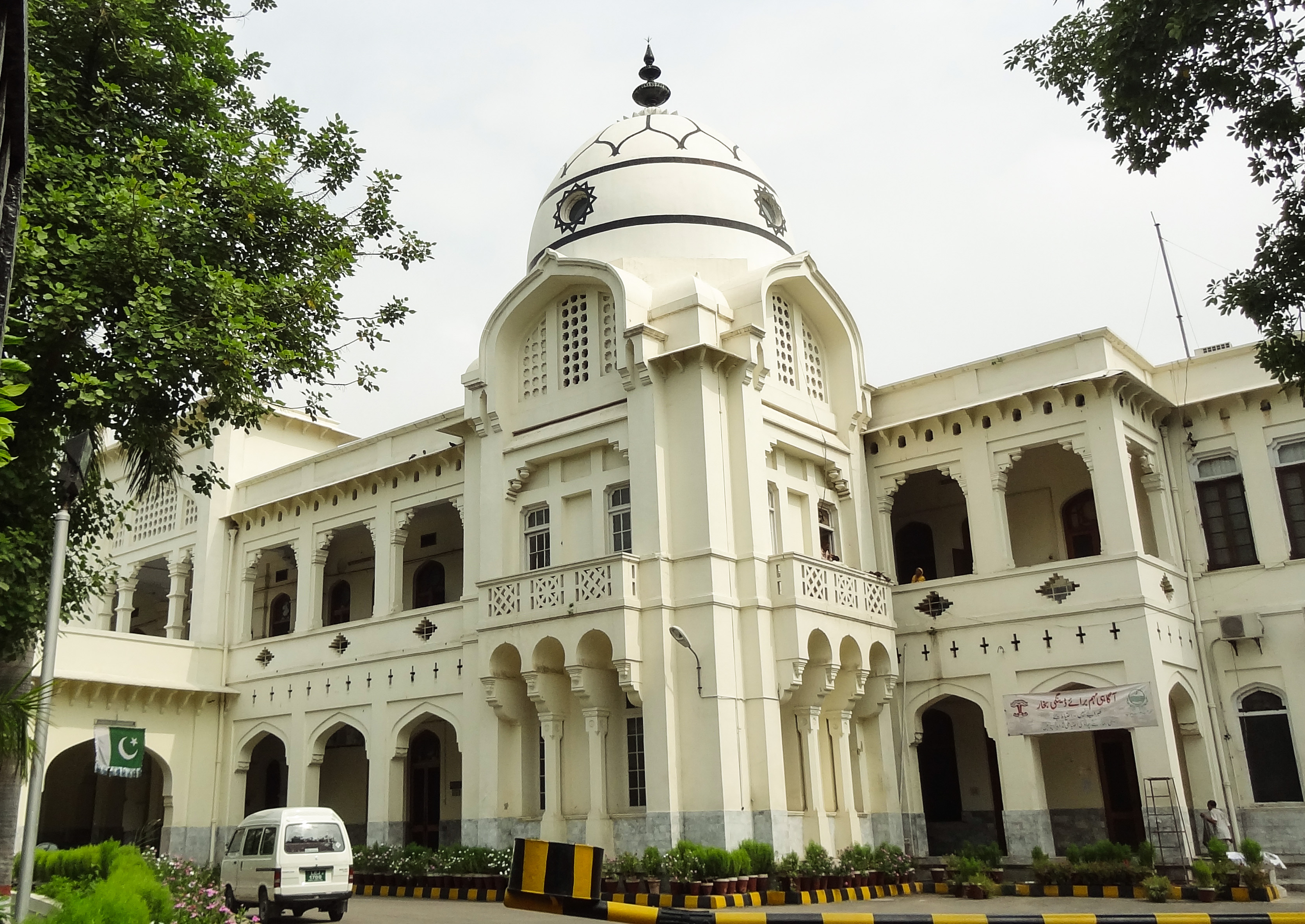
Patiala Block of King Edward Medical University, Lahore

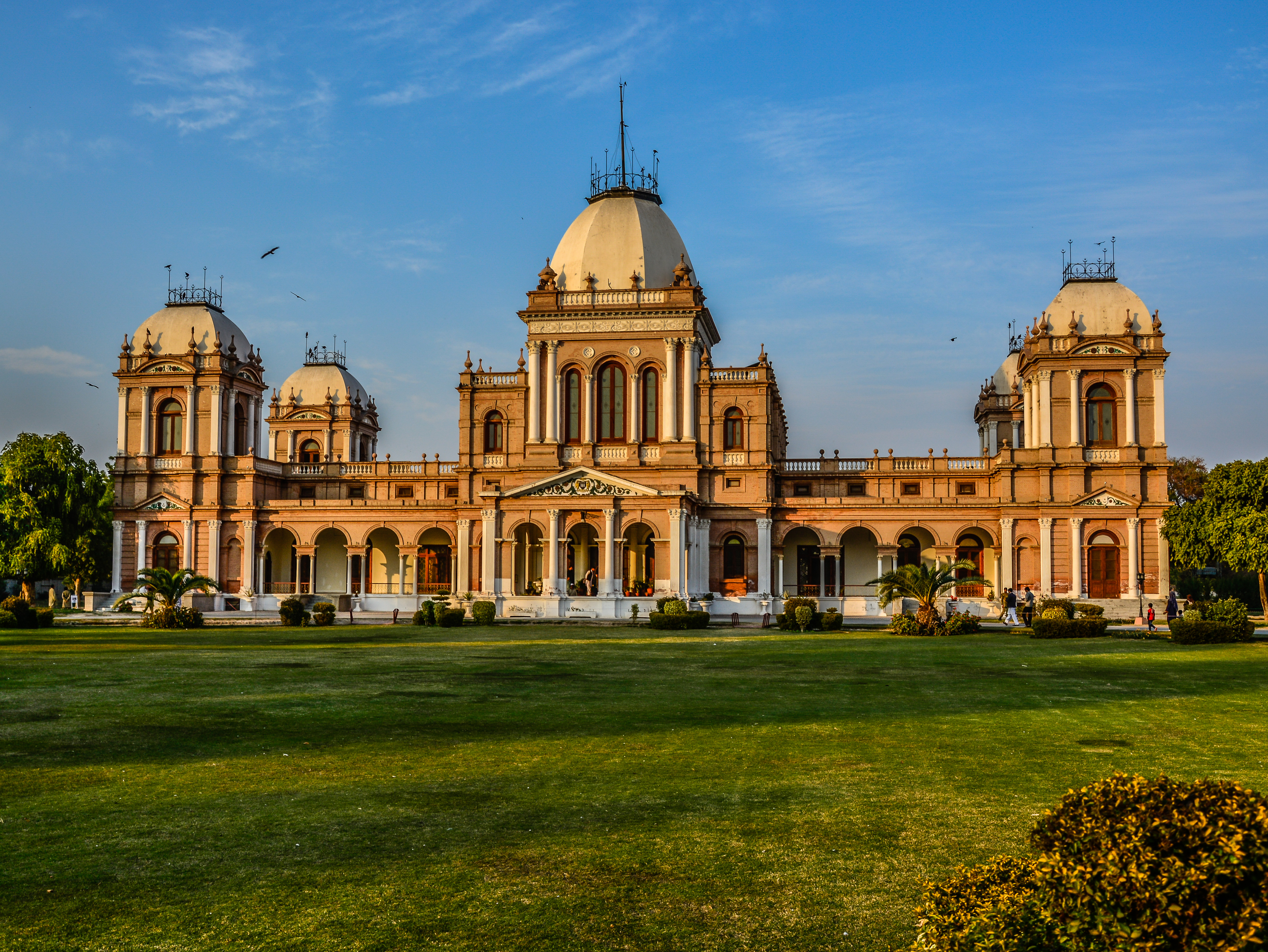
Noor Mahal, Bahawalpur

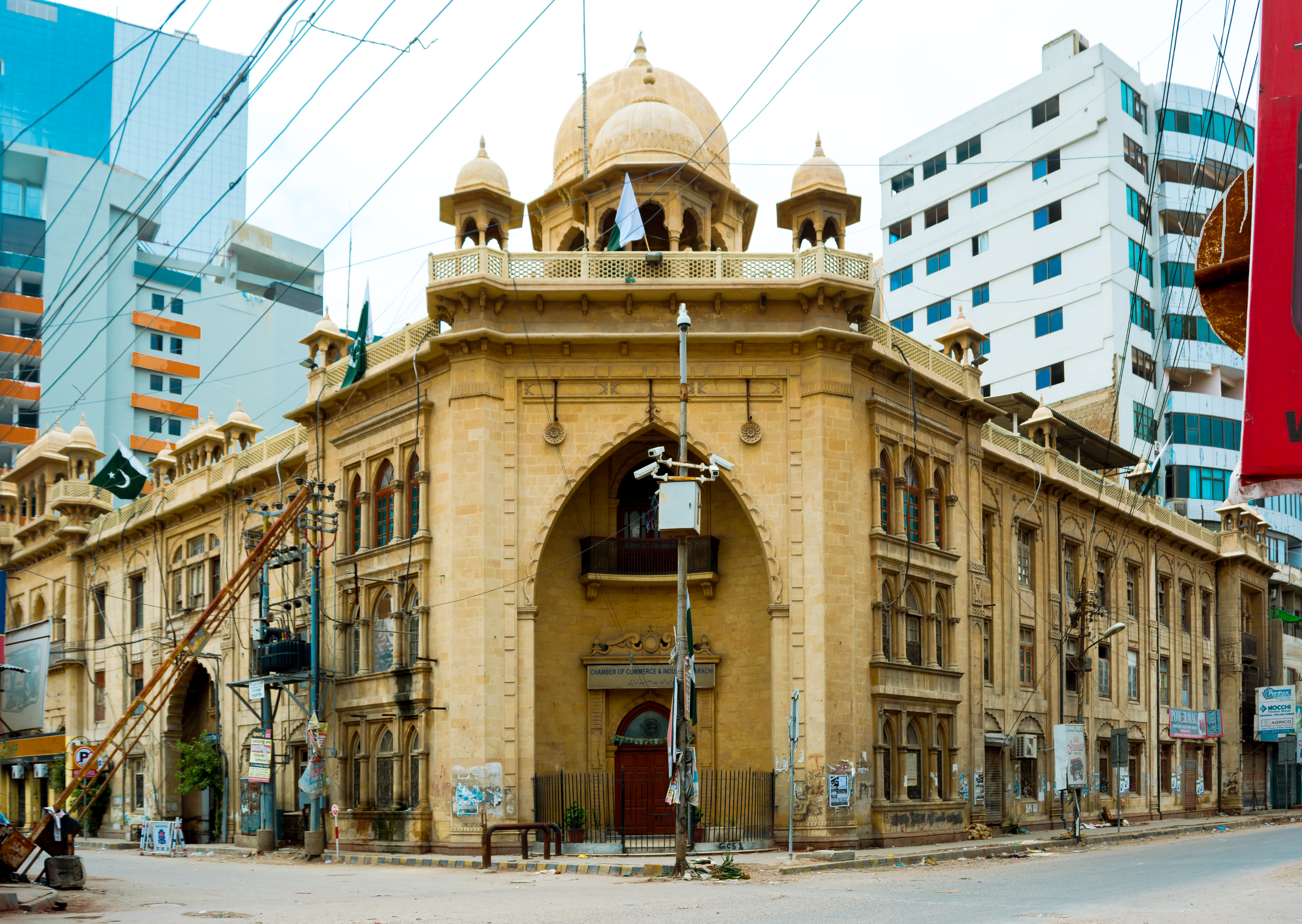
Karachi Chamber of Commerce Building

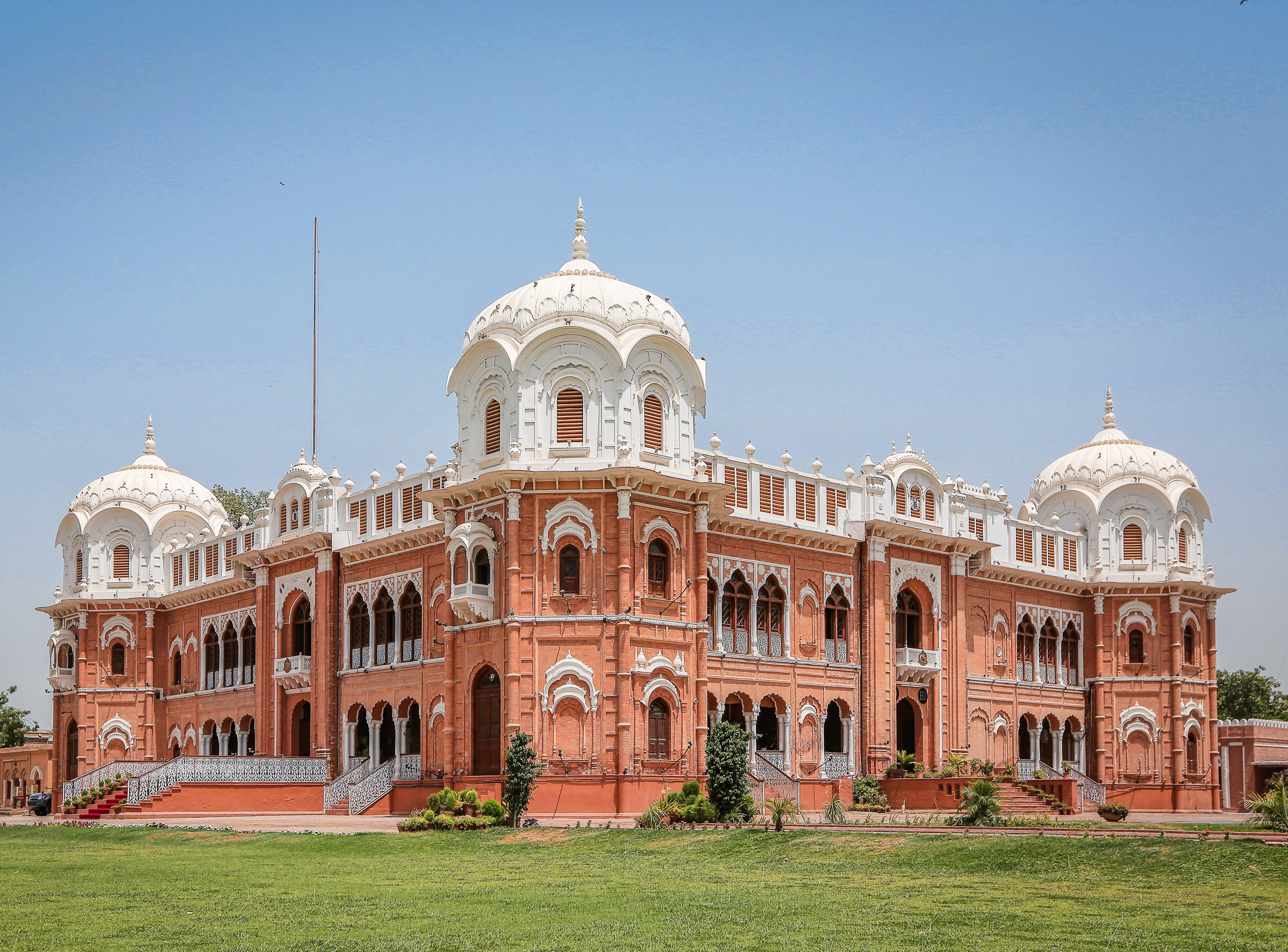
Darbar Mahal, Bahawalpur

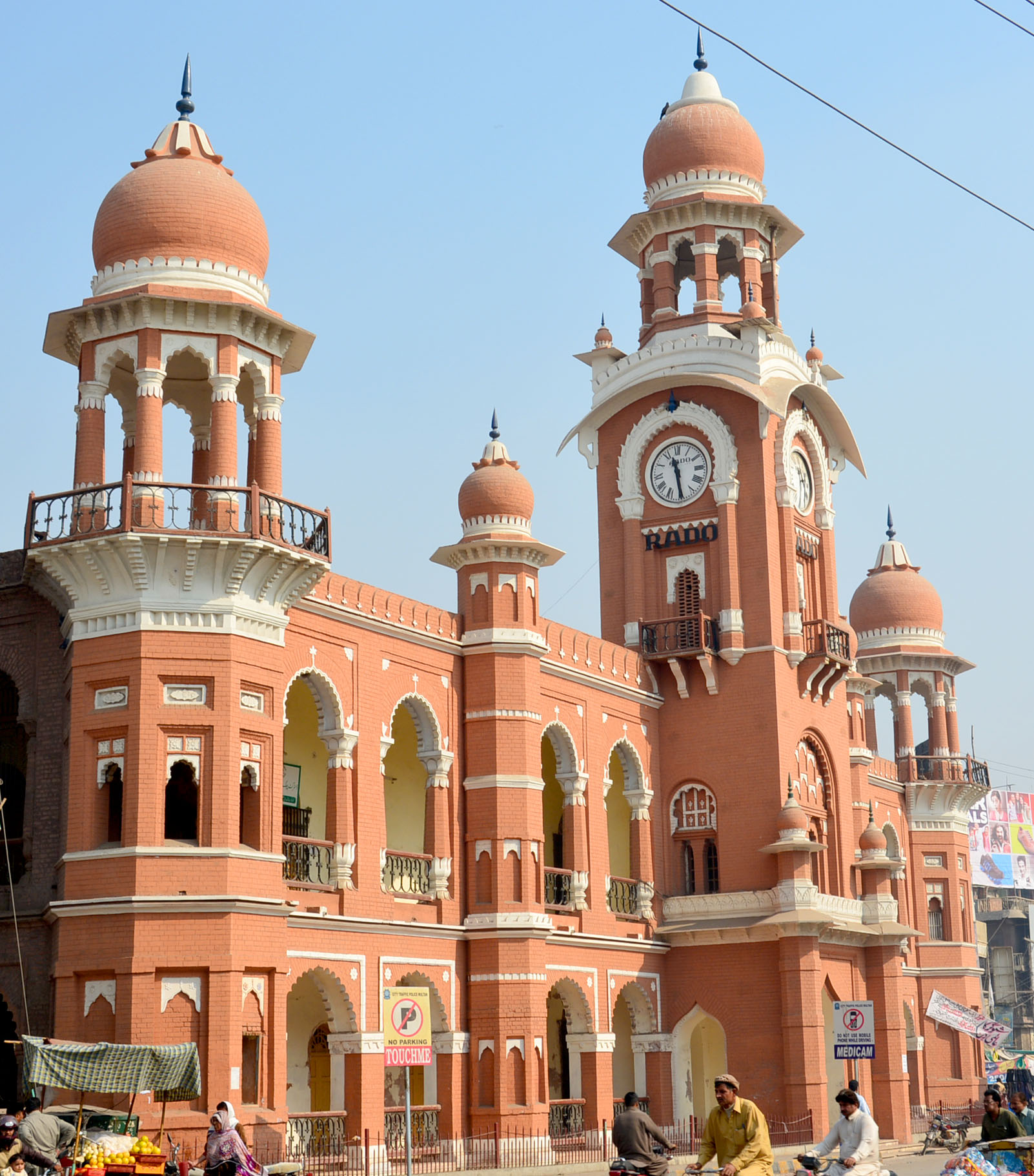
Multan Clock Tower, Multan

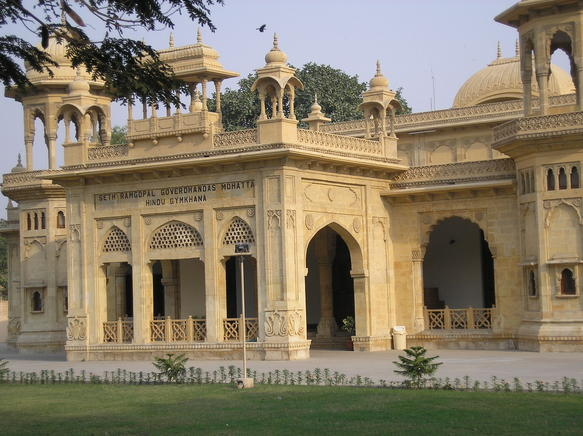
National Academy of Performing Arts, Karachi

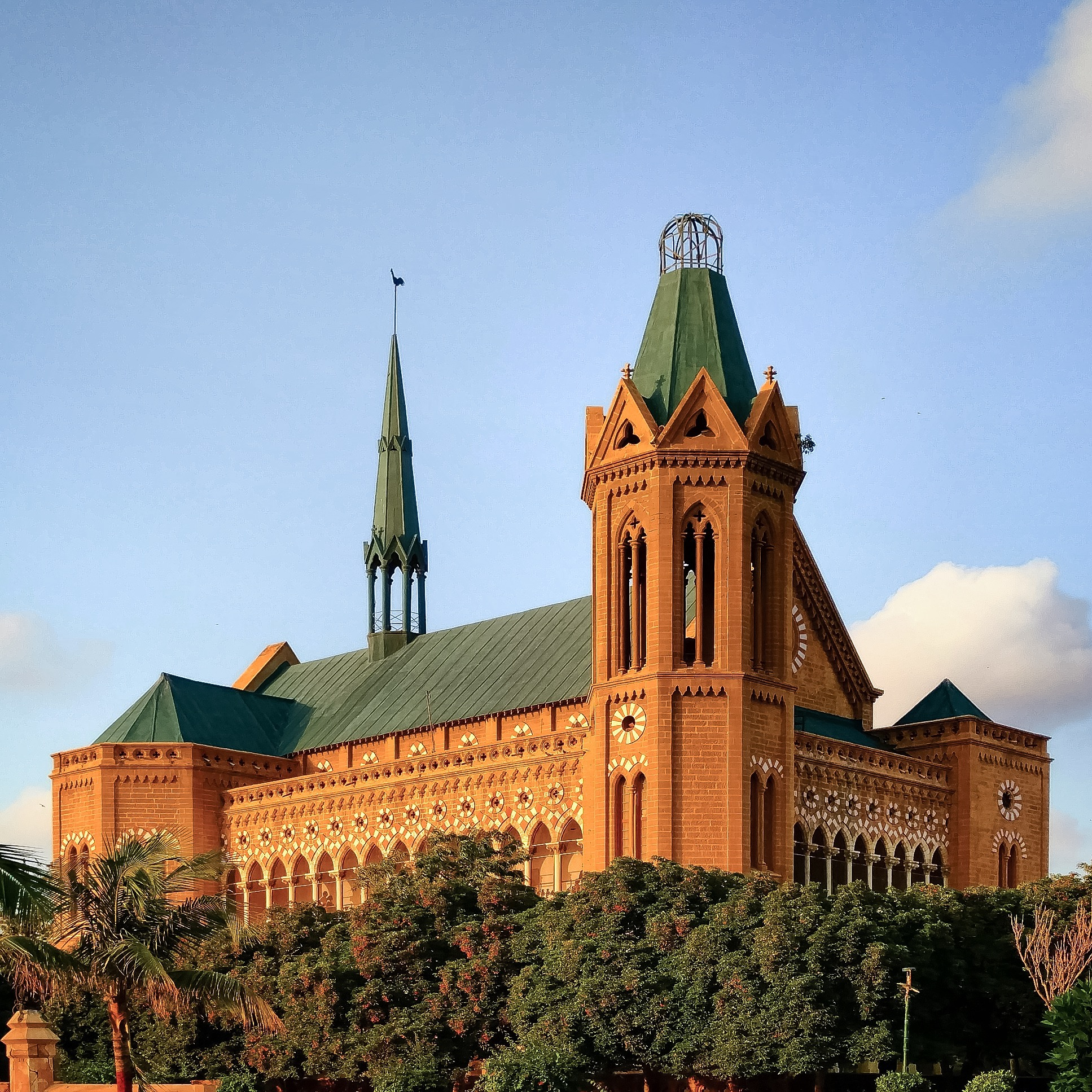
Frere Hall, Karachi

=== Post-Independence ===
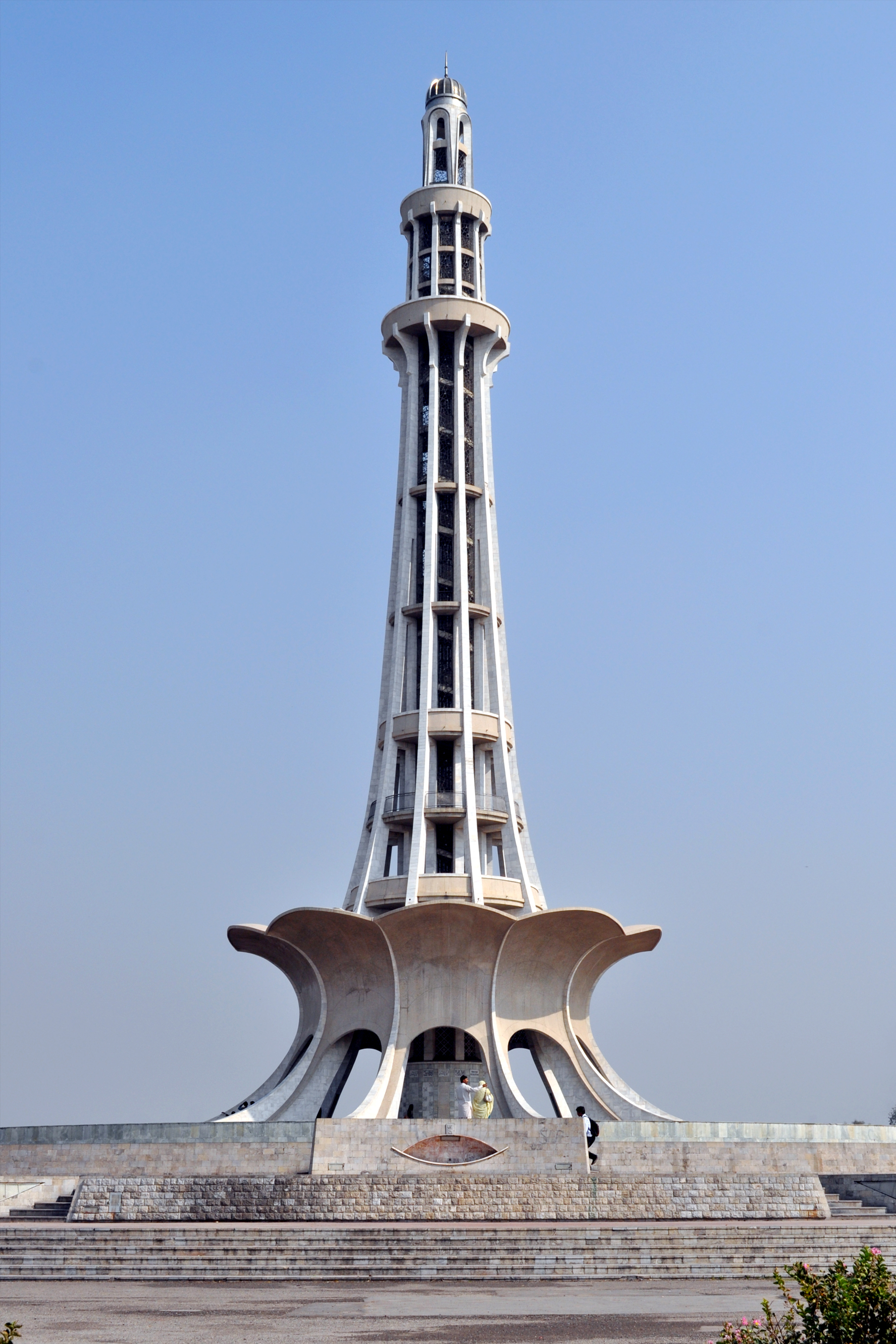
Minar-e-Pakistan at Lahore

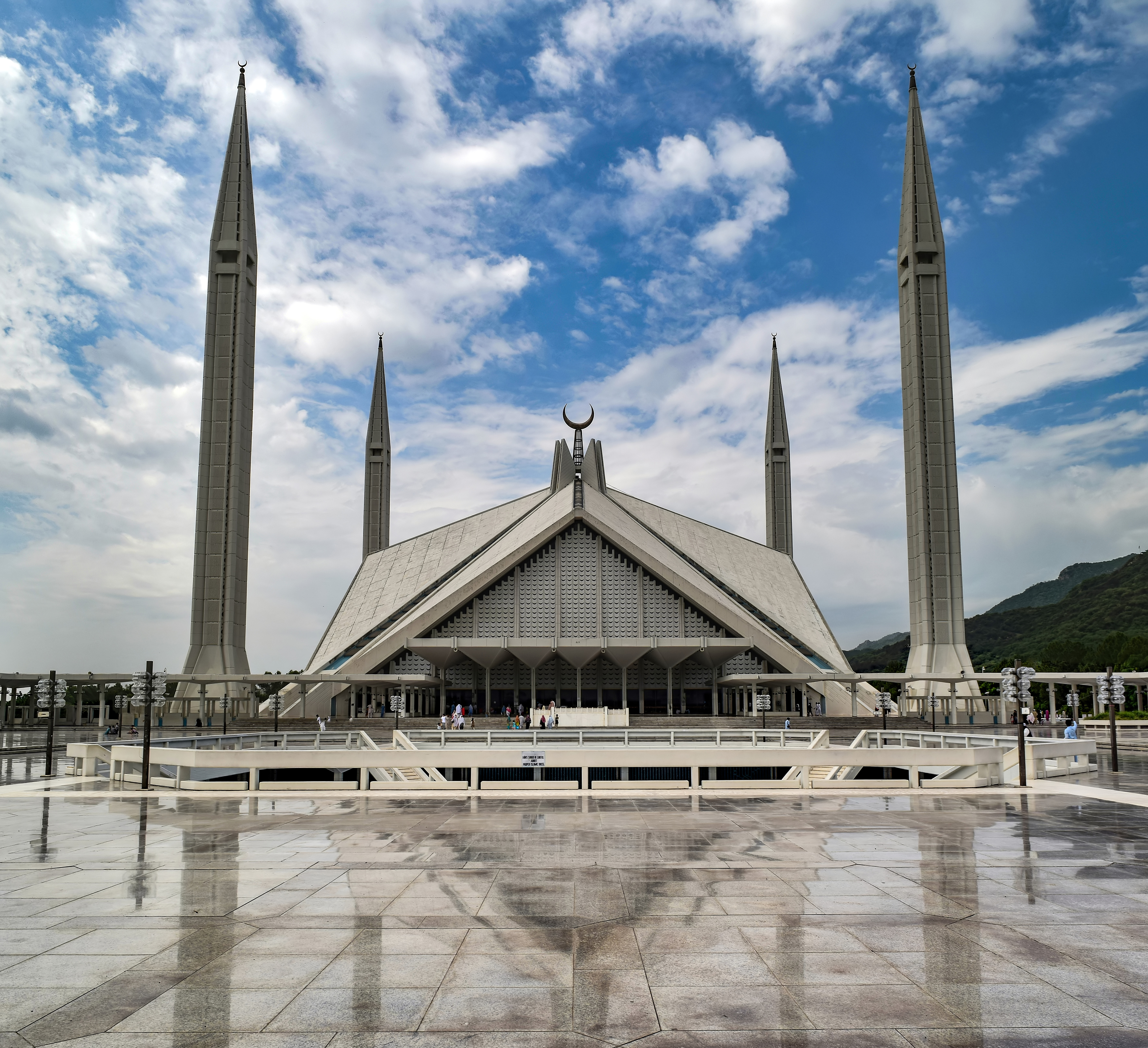
Faisal Mosque in Islamabad

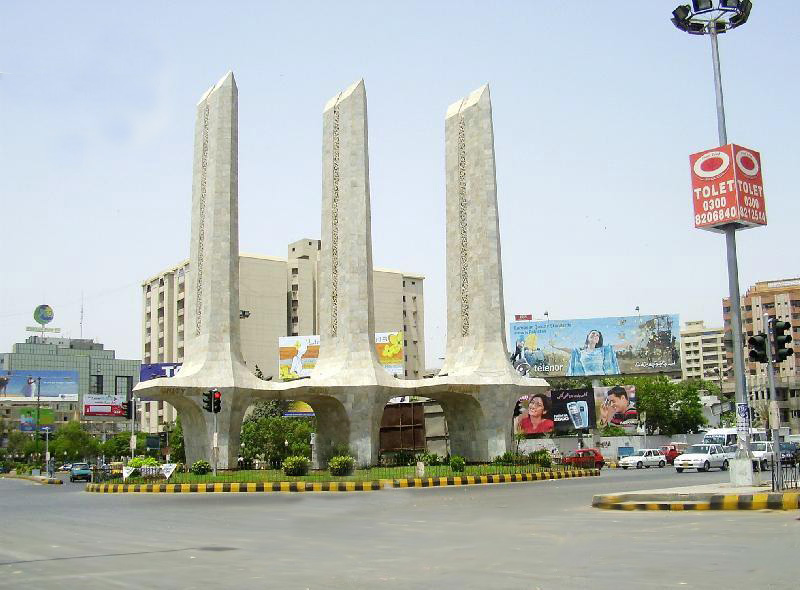
Teen Talwar, Karachi

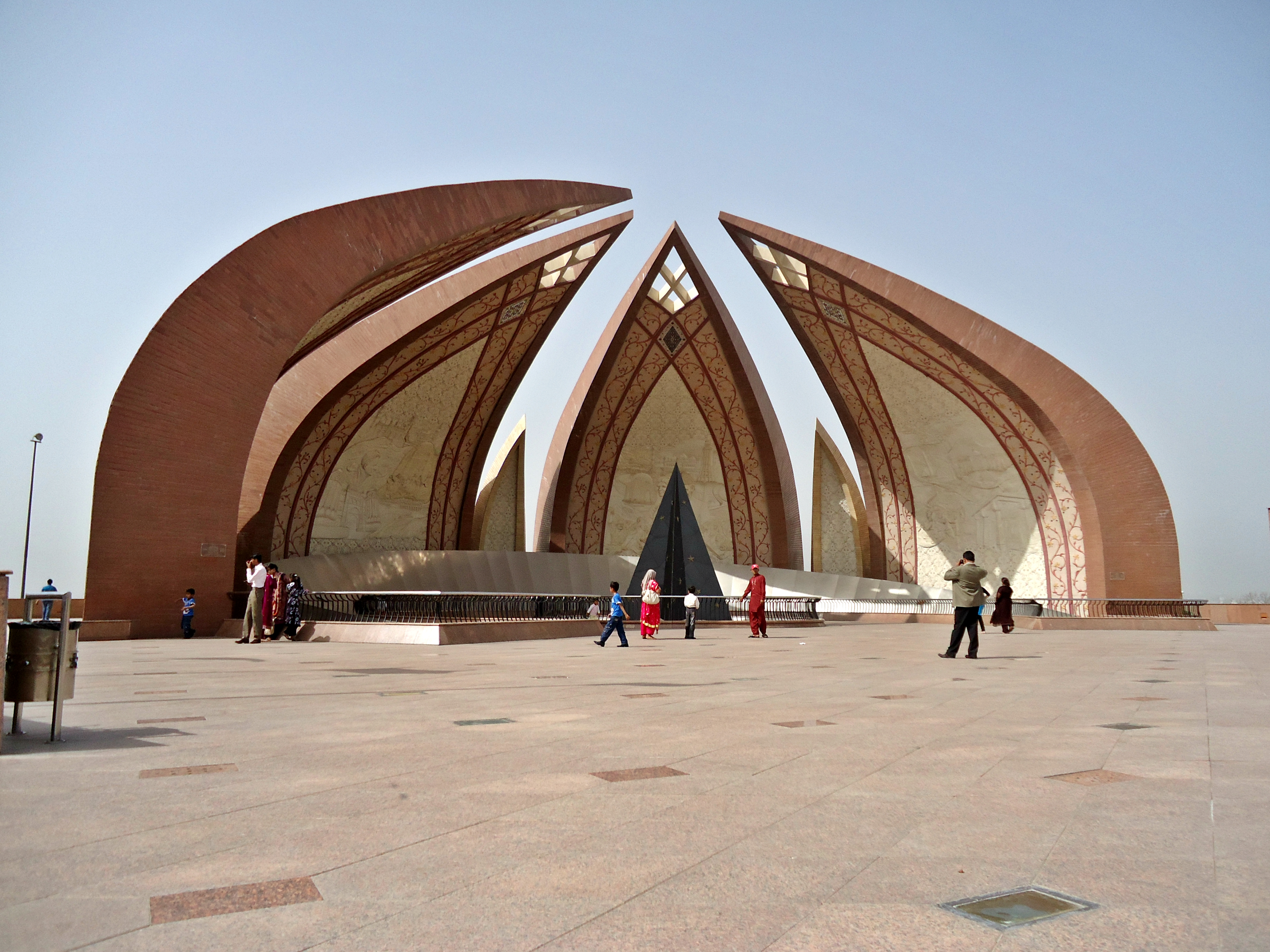
Pakistan Monument, Islamabad

== See also ==
- Culture of Pakistan
- List of Pakistani architects
- List of mosques in Pakistan
