= Seraj Park =

Suburb of Lahore, Pakistan

Coordinates: 31.6297°N 74.2833°E

Seraj Park, (Urdu: سراج پارک), is a northern suburb of Shahdara, Lahore, Punjab, Pakistan. It is situated on the northern side of the Ravi River.

Seraj Park can be translated as (Duban Pura) and also known as "Lamp Garden". Seraj translates as "Lamp" and Park translates as Garden. In the 15th century, Seraj Park was the Neighborhood of Shahdara Lahore under the Mughal Empire. It hosts several historic Passageway sites. These near areas include the Akbari Sarai, the Tomb of Jahangir (who was the Emperor from 1605 to 1627), the tomb of his consort Noor Jahan, as well as the tomb of his brother-in-law Asif Khan. Seraj Park is also home to Imran Ki Baradari (Imran Ki Baradari). Although this site was originally built on the Ravi River bank, the river changed course, covering the site near the Ravi Bridge. The small garden houses the tomb of Mughal Princess Dohita Un Nissa Begum (1651-1697). The daughter of Dara Shikoh is also buried here in another tomb.

Seraj Park's nearest places.

== Shahdara Bagh Railway Station and Shahdara Town Railway Station ==
Qazi Park is located 0.4 km from the station. It is named after 20th-century landowner Qazi Ismail Arain.

Larex Colony 0.5 km Government High School Shahdara 0.7 km Shahdara Bagh 0.8 km Noor Jahan Tomb 0.9 km LDA Sports Ground Shahdra Town 1.5 km Memood Colony 2.5 km Yousaf Park 2.7 km Imamia Colony 3 km Peoples Colony 3.1 km.

== Gallery ==
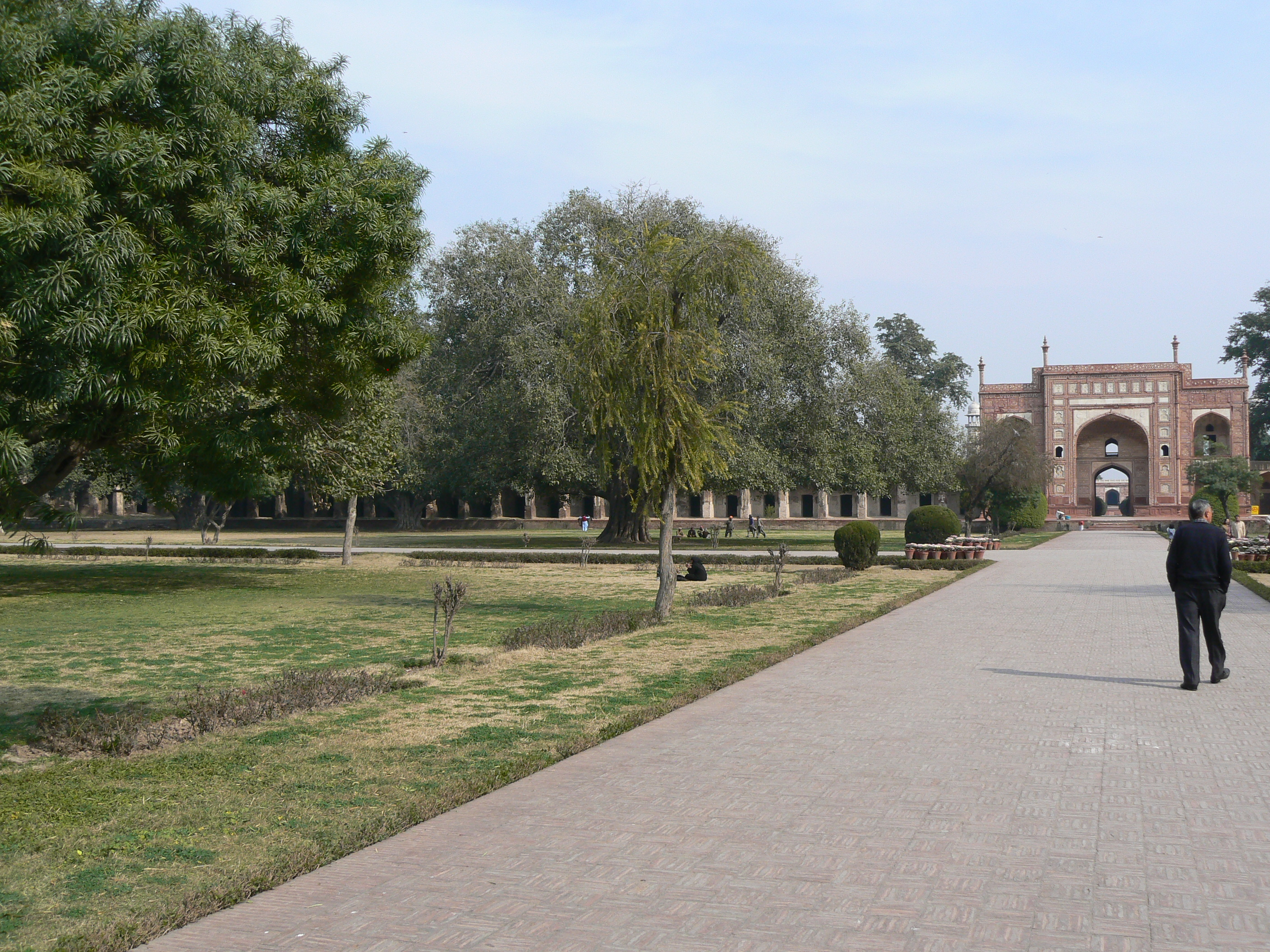
Courtyard of the Akbari Sarai

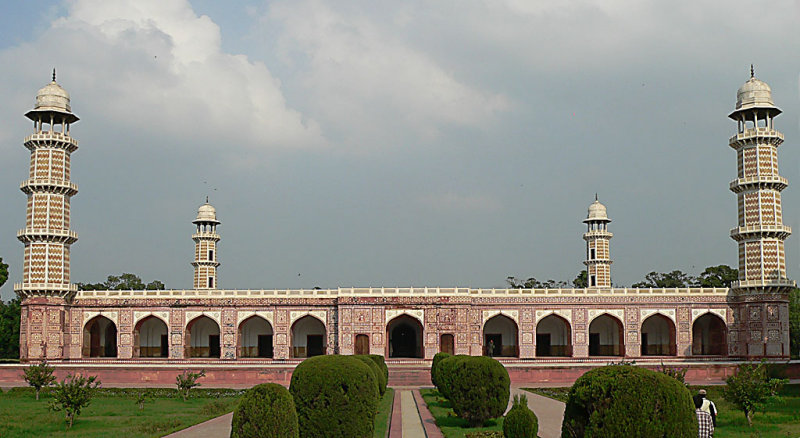
Tomb of Jahangir

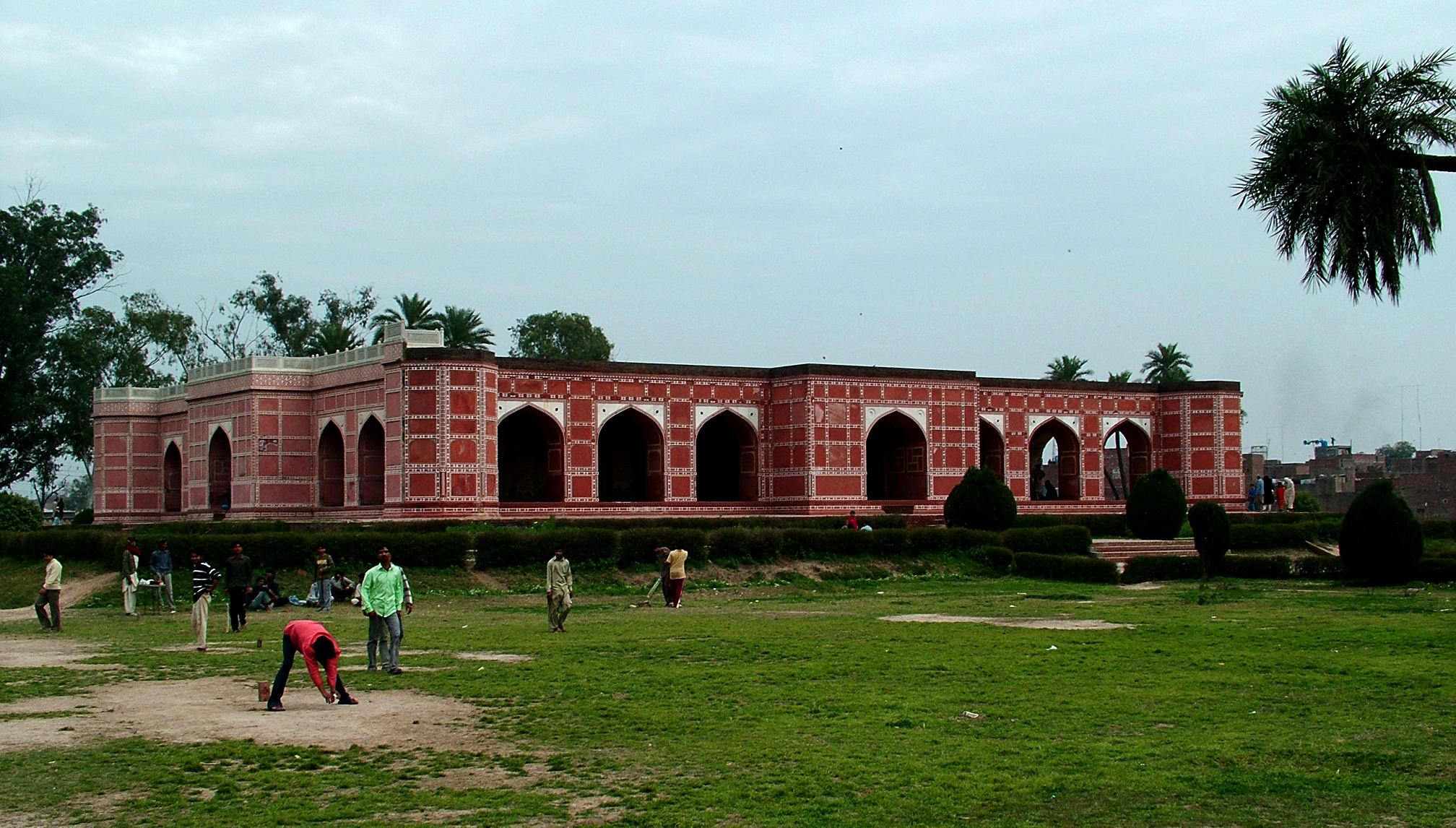
Tomb of Nur Jahan

== See also ==
- List of parks and gardens in Lahore
- List of parks and gardens in Pakistan
- List of parks and gardens in Karachi
- Tomb of Asif Khan
- Tomb of Jahangir
- Tomb of Muhammad Iqbal
- Tomb of Nur Jahan
