= Akbari Sarai =

Monument in Lahore, Pakistan

- اکبری سرائے
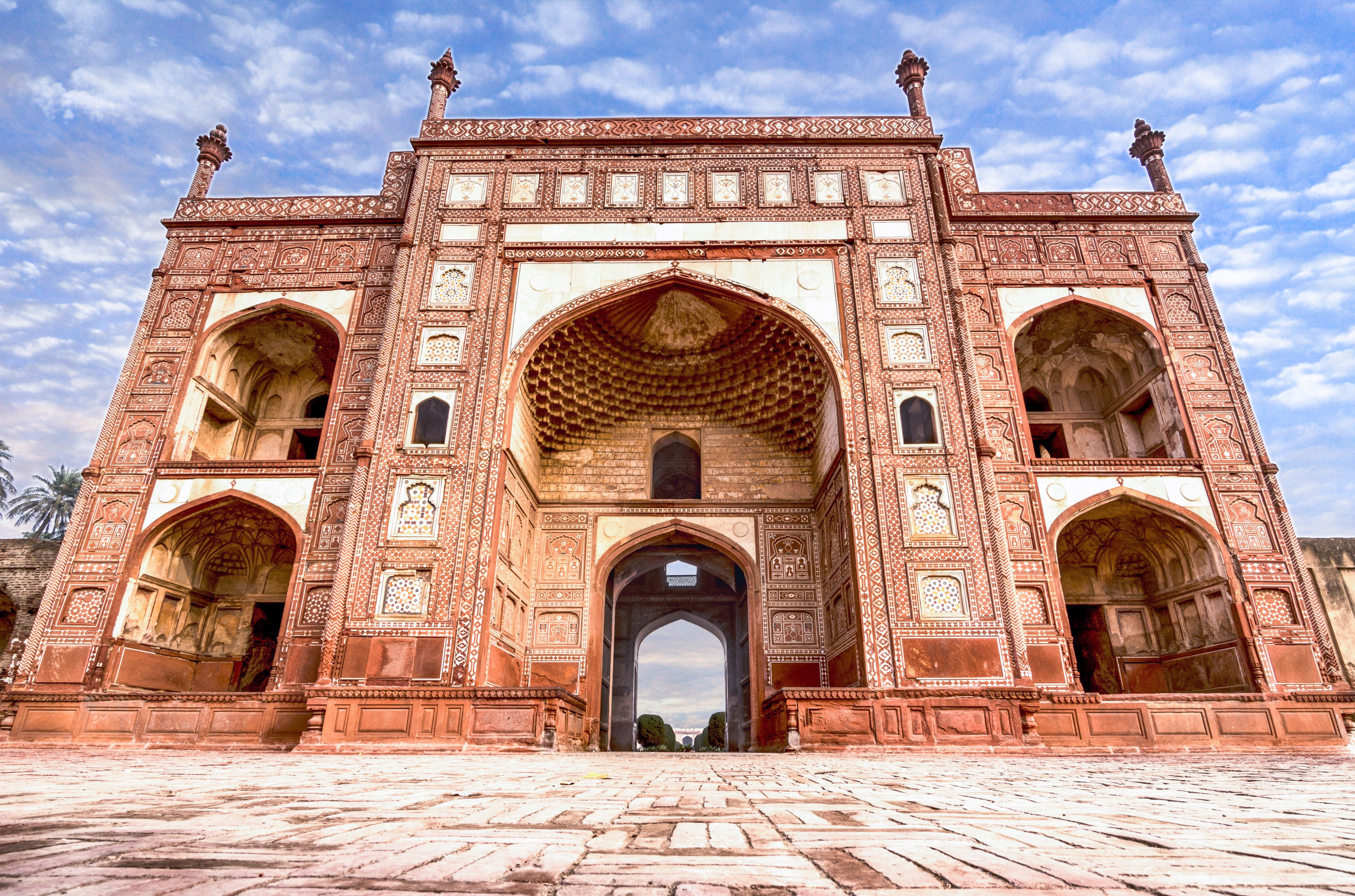
- The Akbari Sarai features a monumental gateway that leads to the Tomb of Jahangir, and is richly embellished with pietra dura
- Interactive map of Akbari Sarai
- Location: Lahore, Punjab, Pakistan
- Coordinates: 31.6225°N 74.2997°E
- Type: Gateway
- Completion date: 1637

The Akbari Sarai (Punjabi, Urdu: اکبری سرائے, romanized: Akbarī sarā'ē) is a large caravan inn (sarai), located in Shahdara Bagh in Lahore, Punjab, Pakistan. Dating from 1637, the sarai was originally built for travelers, as well as for caretakers of the Tomb of Jahangir. The sarai is most notable for being the best-preserved example in Pakistan, as well as for its large gateway that is richly embellished with pietra dura that serves as a portal to the tomb of Jahangir.

== Etymology ==
The name can be translated as "Palace of Akbar". Abdul Hamid Lahori, court historian to the Emperor Shah Jahan, mentioned the building by the name Jilu Khana-e-Rauza, which means "attached court of the tomb", in his book the Padshahnama.

== Location ==
The sarai quadrangle is situated in the middle of the tomb of Jahangir to the east of the sarai, and the tomb of Asif Khan to the west of the sarai.

== History ==
Despite the name of the structure, Akbari Sarai was begun during the reign of Islam Shah Suri in the mid 1550s, and not during the reign of the Mughal Emperor Akbar. The mosque at the sarai dates from the Suri period, though the cells which line the complex, and its gateways, date from the Shah Jahan period in the mid 1600s.

The sarai served as both a station for wayfarers, and also a mail station known as a dāk chowkī. The sarai was administered by an official known as a Shāhnā with several assistant caretakers. The 180 cells around the courtyard were used as living areas and storage spaces for luggage, weapons, and other gear carried by visitors to the tombs. Fodder for animals, hot and cold water, and bed steads were provided free of charge. The sarai also had a physician, as well as a resident baker, and a water well located outside of the walls of the sarai. As with many sarais, a small bazaar may have run between each gate.

Maharajah Ranjit Singh converted the complex into a cantonment of one of his foreign generals, Musa Farangi, who used to live here with his platoon. The site was severely damaged during the British era, when it was used as a rail depot following the construction of the nearby rail line.

== Architecture ==
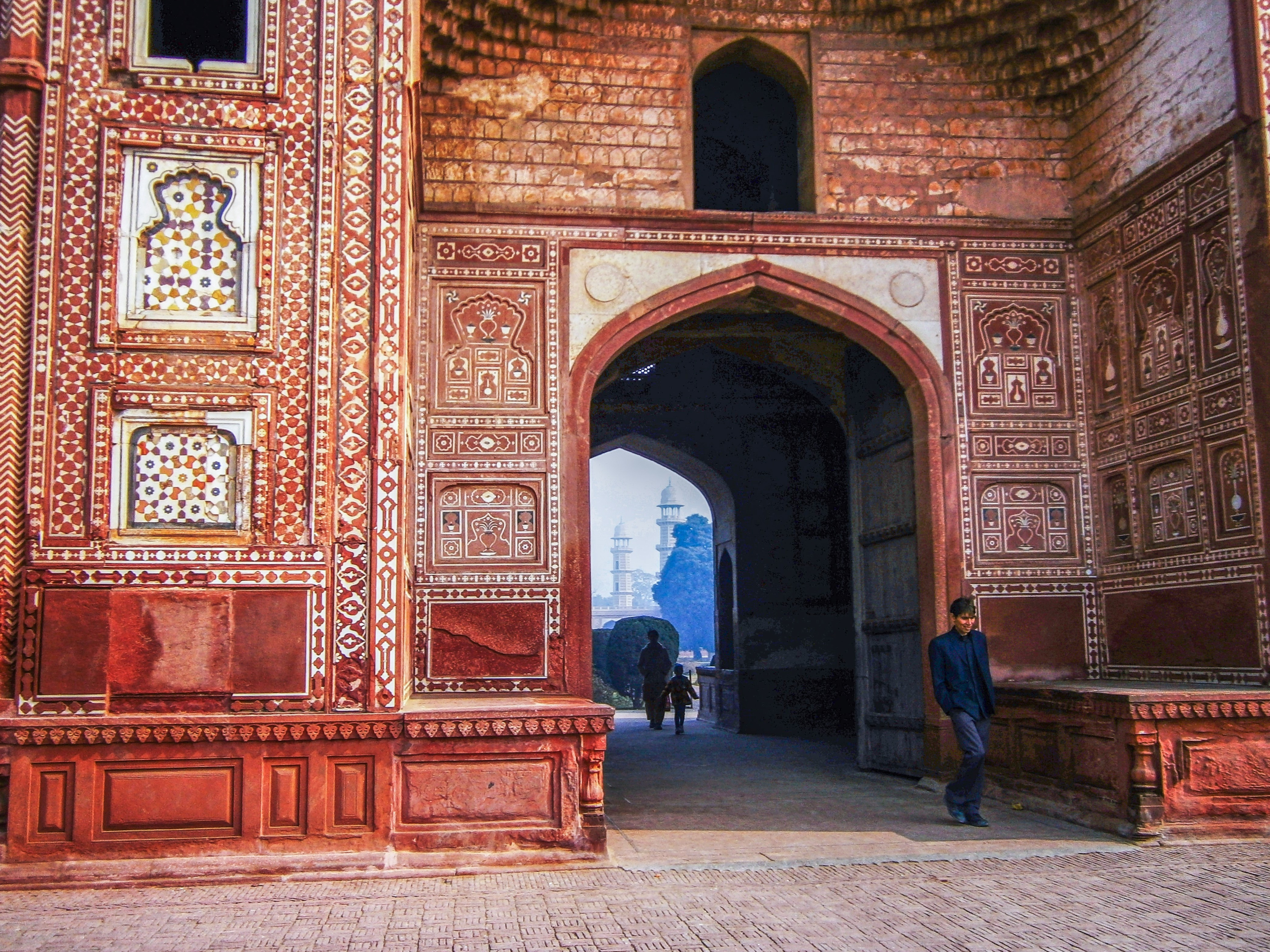
The building's red sandstone is richly decorated with pietra dura.

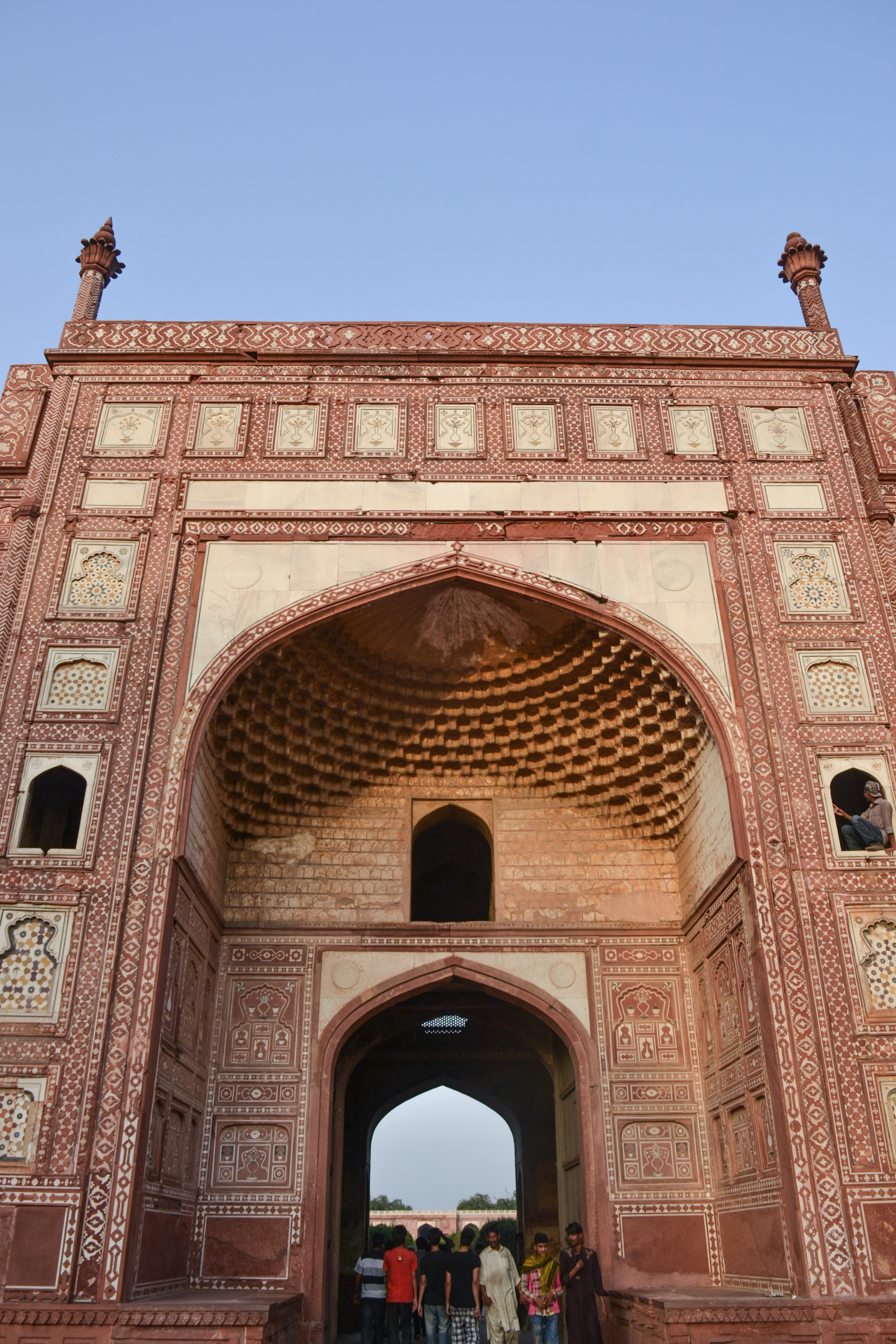
The main portal features muqarna decoration.

The sarai is in the form of an oblong quadrangle, which covers a total area of 12 acres. The sarai measures 797 feet by 610 feet. The courtyard of the sarai complex is flanked on all sides by a raised terrace where rows of 180 cells known as khanaha are located with a veranda and a common open passage.

The corners of the sarai are flanked by towers. Tower chambers are the most elaborate of all the sarai's cells, and feature and elliptical hall in front with a veranda, with an octagonal room in the back.

The palace has two large gateways in the Mughal style, located to the north and to the south that were built to be visible from a distance. The gateway is two stories, and housed the shāhnā. The main arch serving as a portal to the tomb of Jahangir features a large double storied iwan, flanked by 4 other smaller arched niches featuring ghalib kari, or a network of ribs in stucco and plaster applied to curved surfaces in each archway. The central iwan is decorated with muqarnas. while the façade of the gateway is richly decorated with pietra dura. The decorative elements, the style of the structure, and the size of the bricks indicate that the palace and the gateways to the tomb could have been constructed at the same time.

To the west of the palace in the middle of the cell rows is a mosque with three domes. It is clad in red sandstone with decorations. The interior of the mosque was probably once embellished with frescoes and ghalib kari as well.

== Conservation ==
The Akbari Sarai, along with the Tombs of Jahangir and Asif Khan, were inscribed on the tentative list of UNESCO World Heritage Sites in 1993.

== Gallery ==
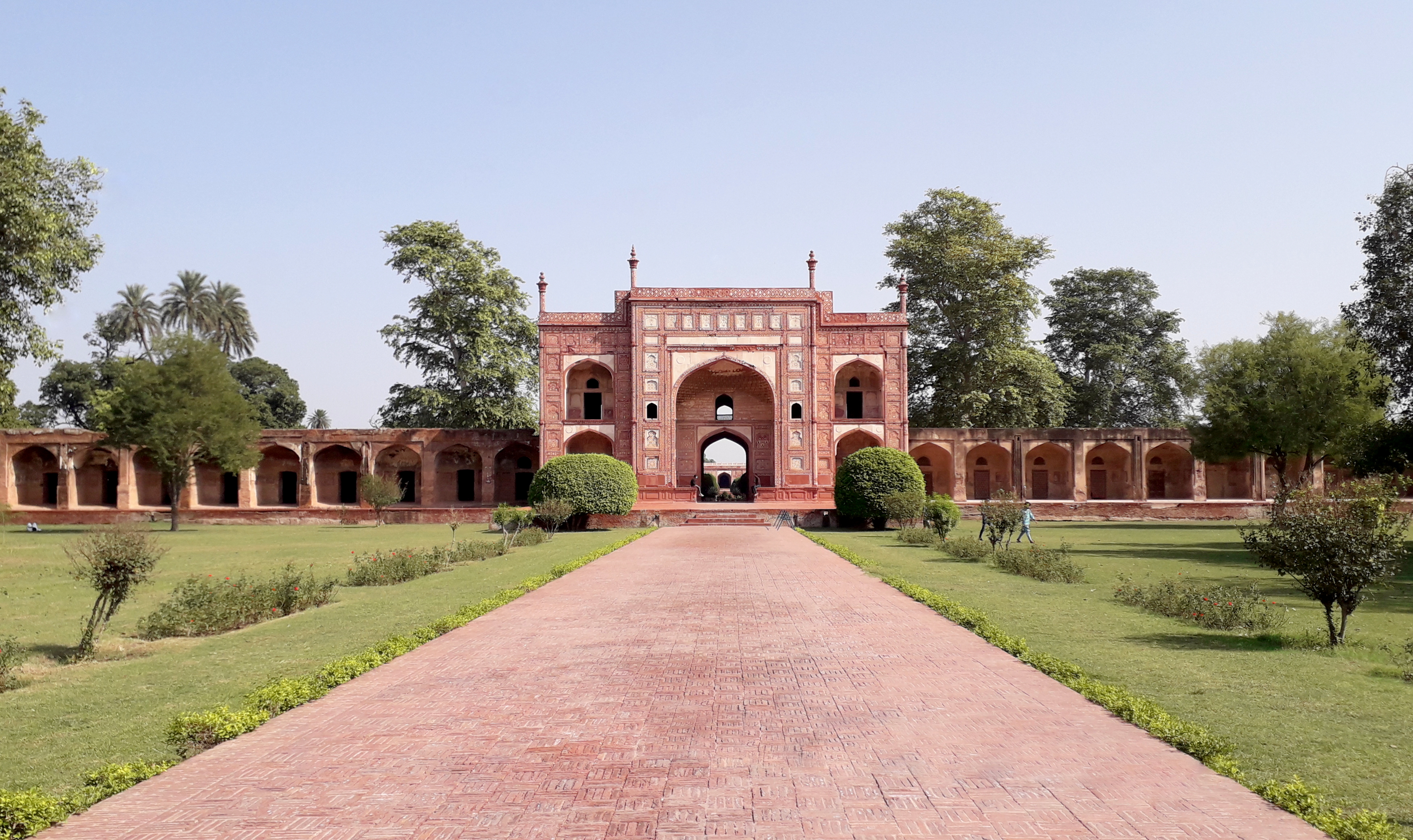
Akbari Sarai from distance

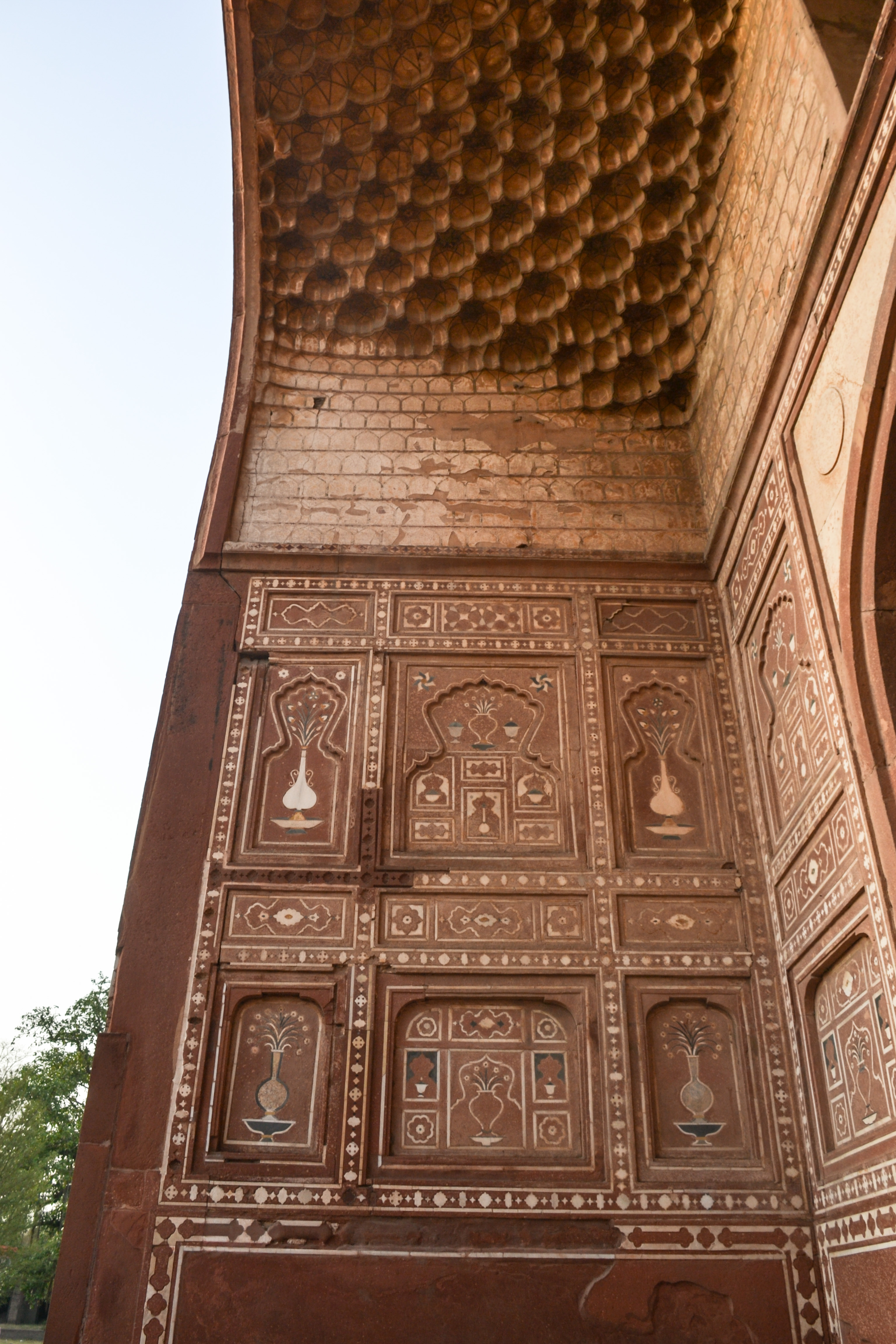
Detail of the structure's pietra dura

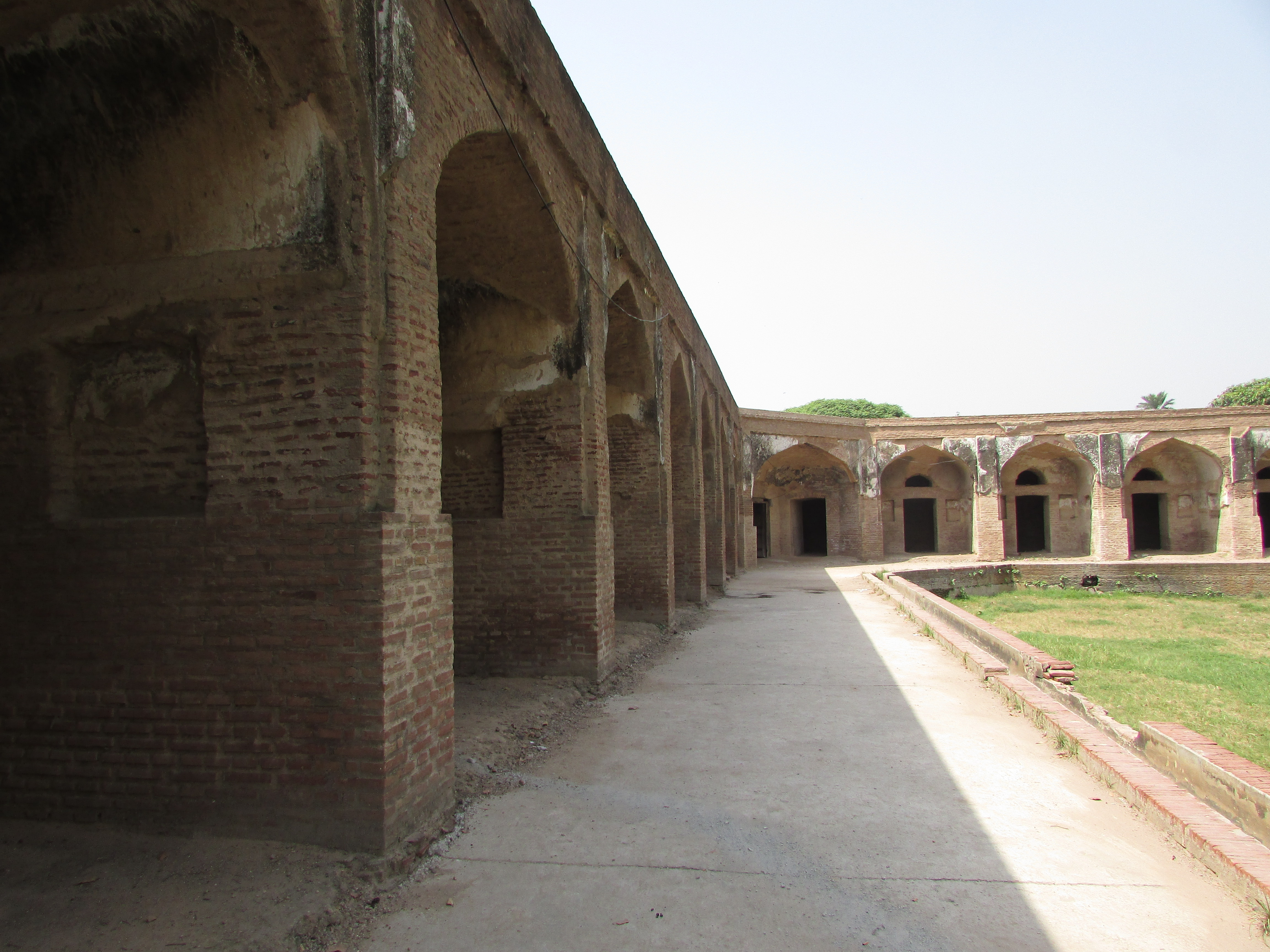
180 small cells line the walls of the saray

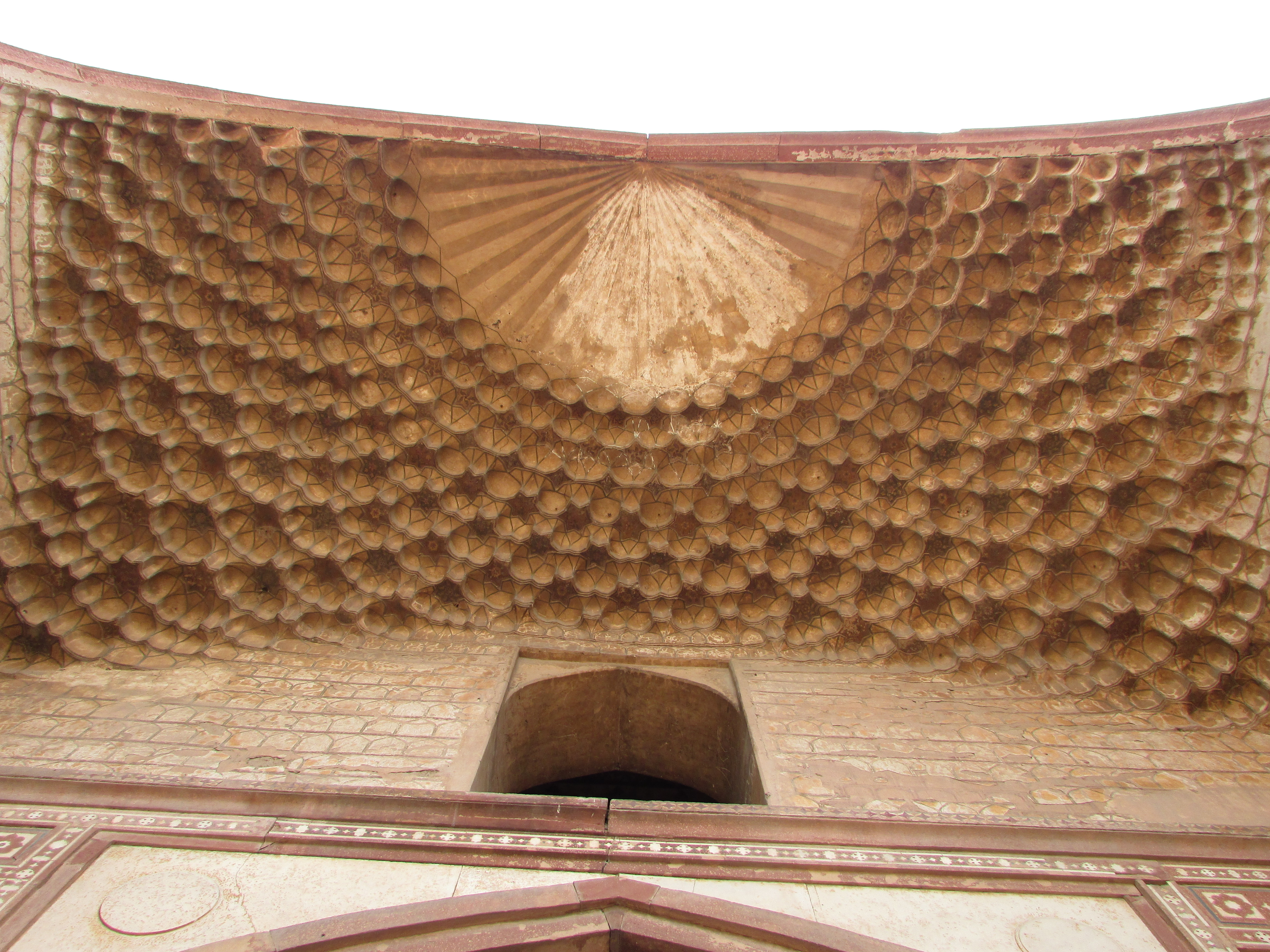
Muqarnas decorate the top the main archway

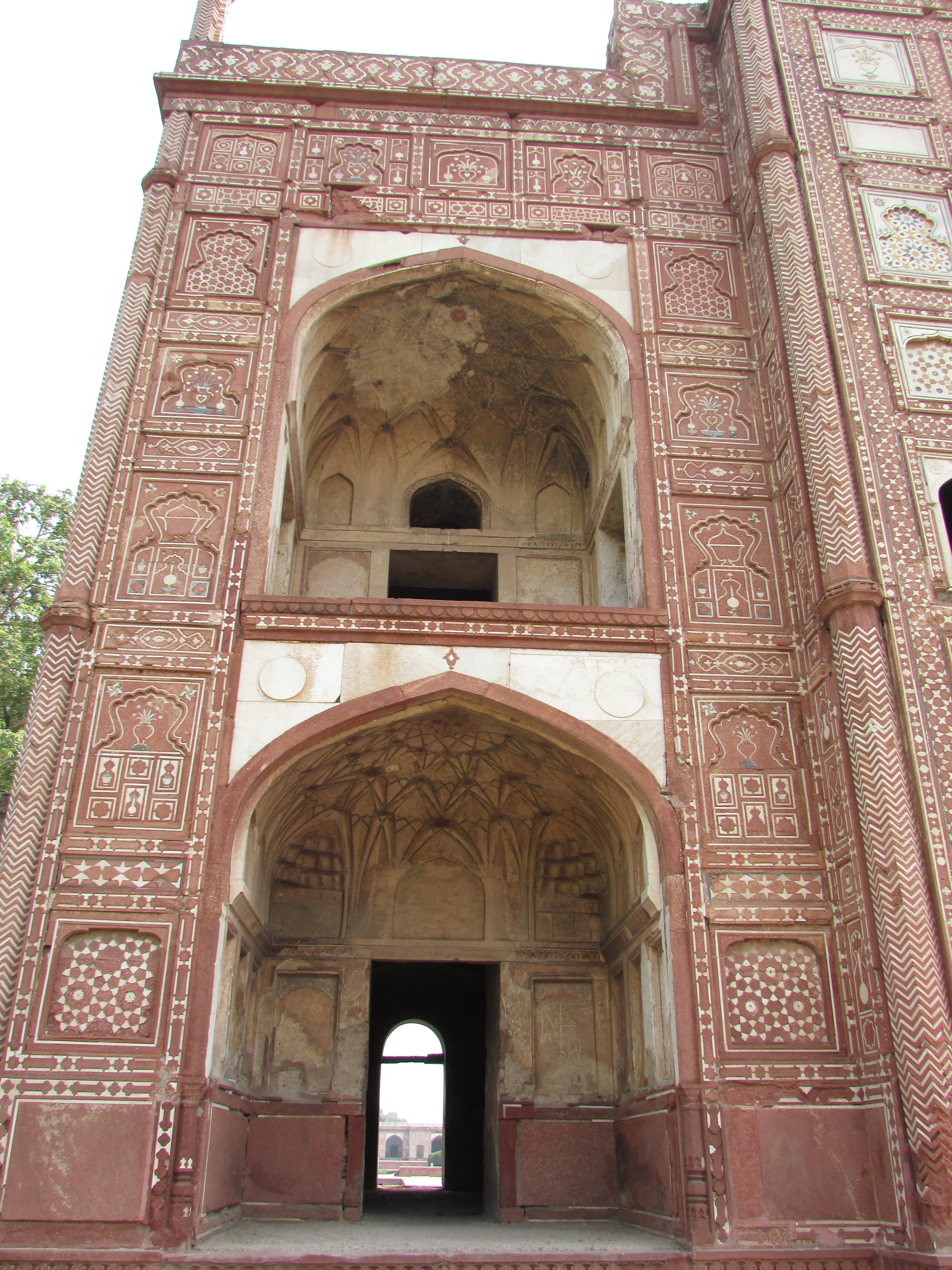
The building is richly embellished with pietra dura

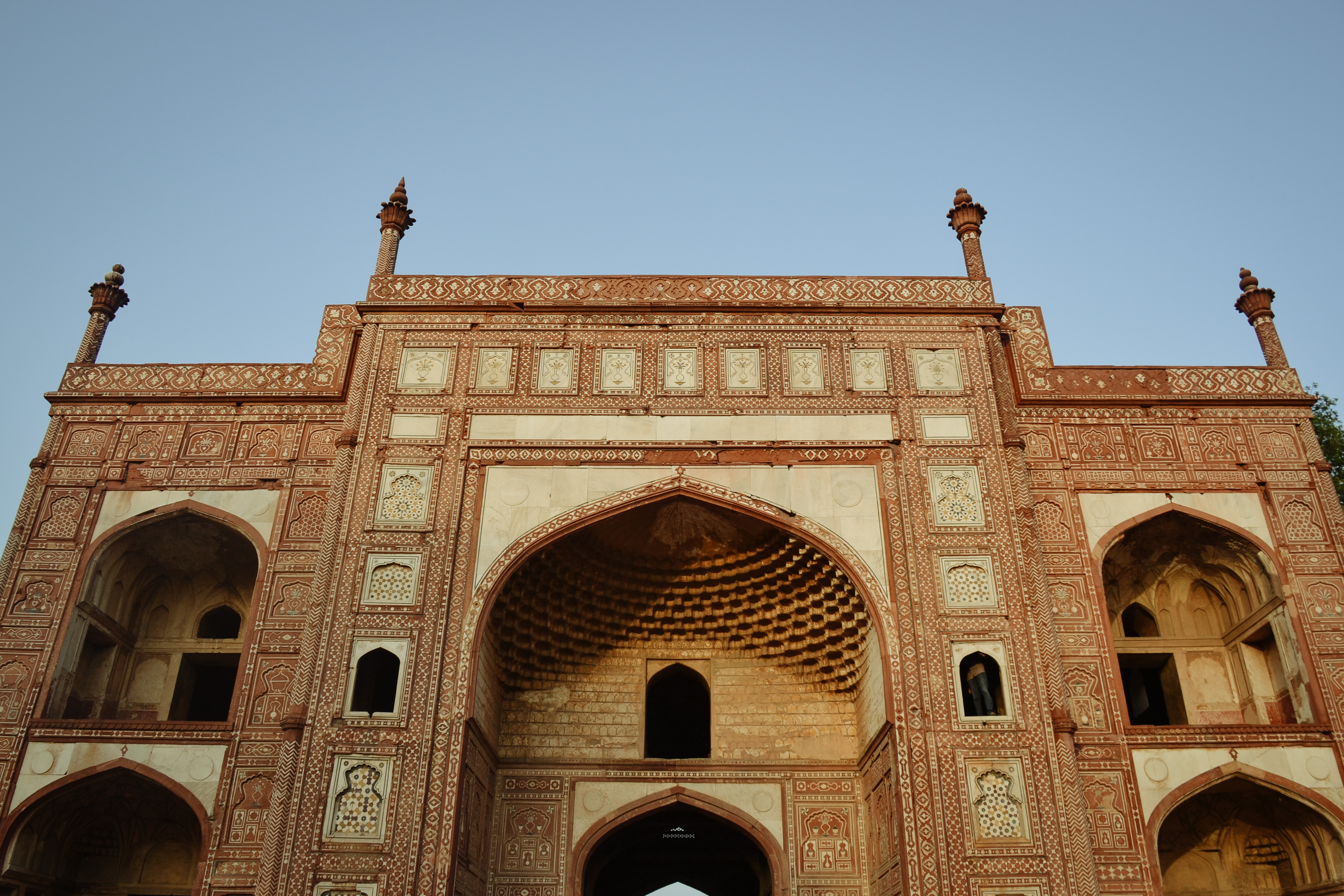

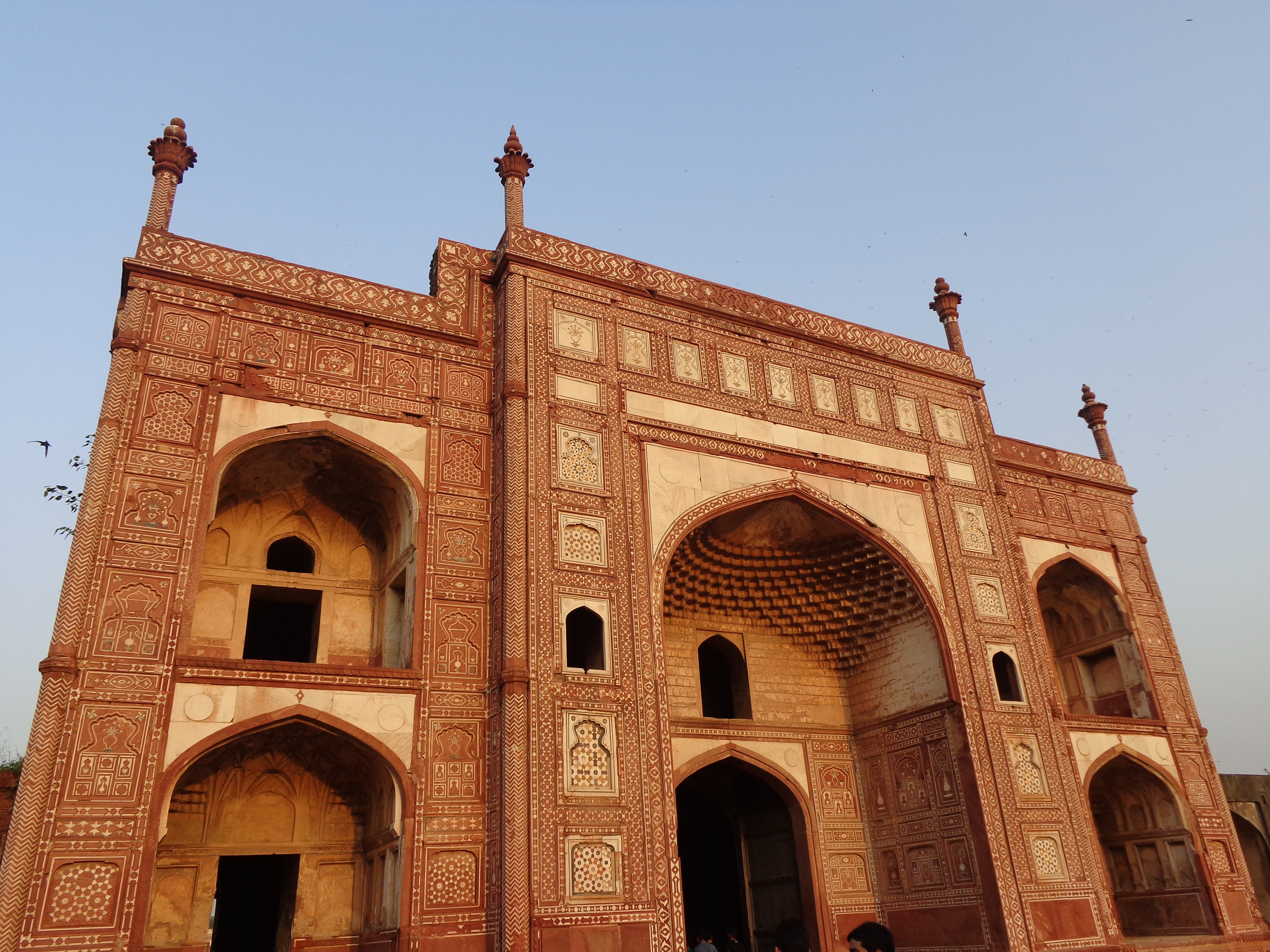

== See also ==
- Tomb of Asif Khan
- Tomb of Jahangir
- Tomb of Muhammad Iqbal
- Tomb of Nur Jahan
- List of parks and gardens in Lahore
- List of parks and gardens in Pakistan
