= Tomb of Asif Khan =

17th-century monument in Lahore, Pakistan

Coordinates: 31.6225°N 74.2975°E

- مقبرۂ آصف خان
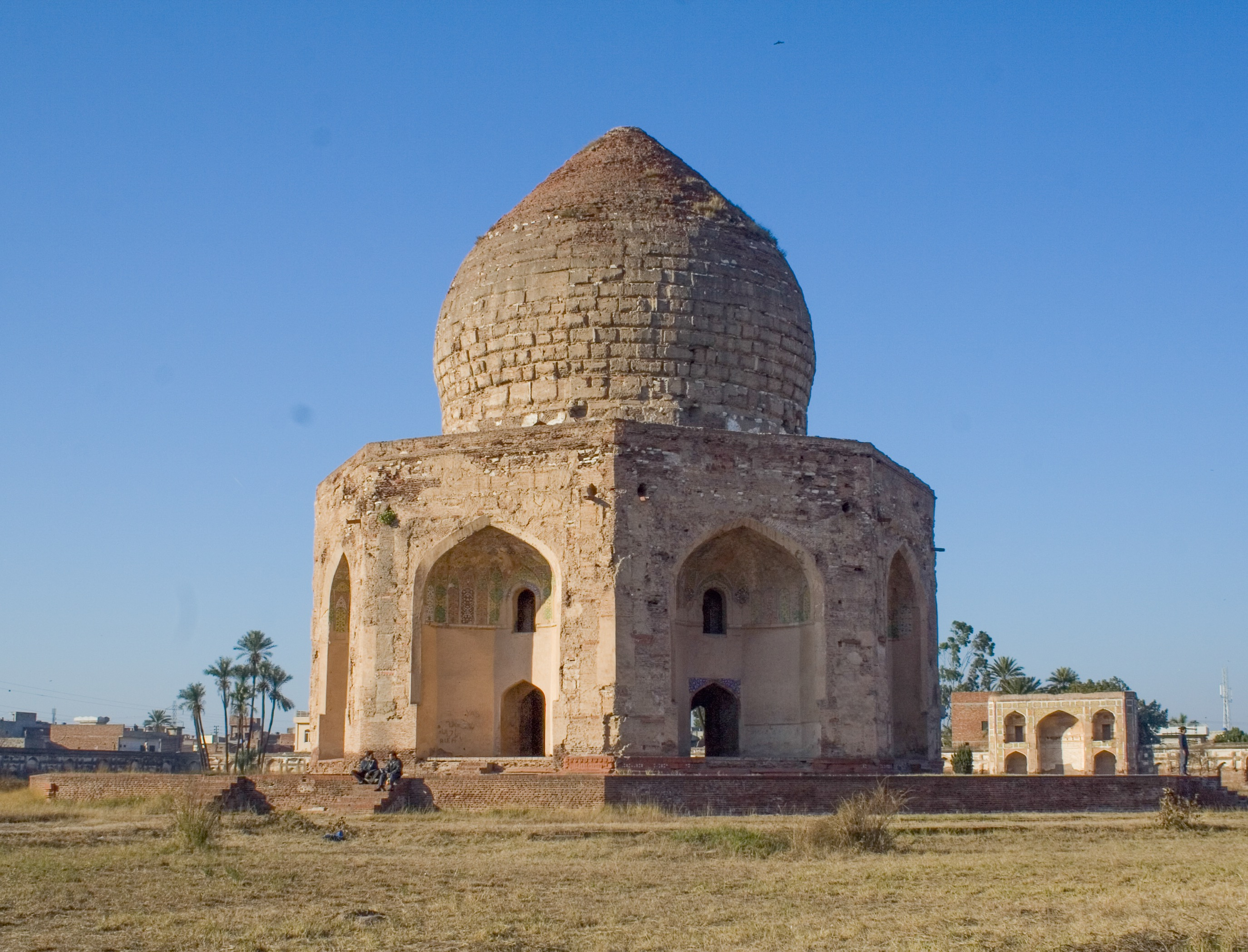
- The tomb of Asif Khan was plundered for its precious building materials during the Sikh period.
- Interactive map of Tomb of Asif Khan
- Location: Lahore, Punjab, Pakistan
- Type: Mausoleum
- Material: Brick. Originally veneered with marble and red sandstone.
- Beginning date: 1641
- Completion date: 1645

The tomb of Asif Khan (Urdu: مقبرۂ آصف خان) is a 17th-century mausoleum located in Shahdara Bagh, in the city of Lahore, in the Punjab province of Pakistan. It was built for the Mughal statesman Mirza Abul Hassan Jah, who was titled Asif Khan. Asif Khan was brother of Nur Jahan, and brother-in-law to the Mughal Emperor Jahangir. Asif Khan's tomb is located adjacent to the Tomb of Jahangir, and near the Tomb of Nur Jahan. Asif Khan's tomb was built in a Central Asian architectural style, and stands in the centre of a Persian-style Charbagh garden.

== Background ==
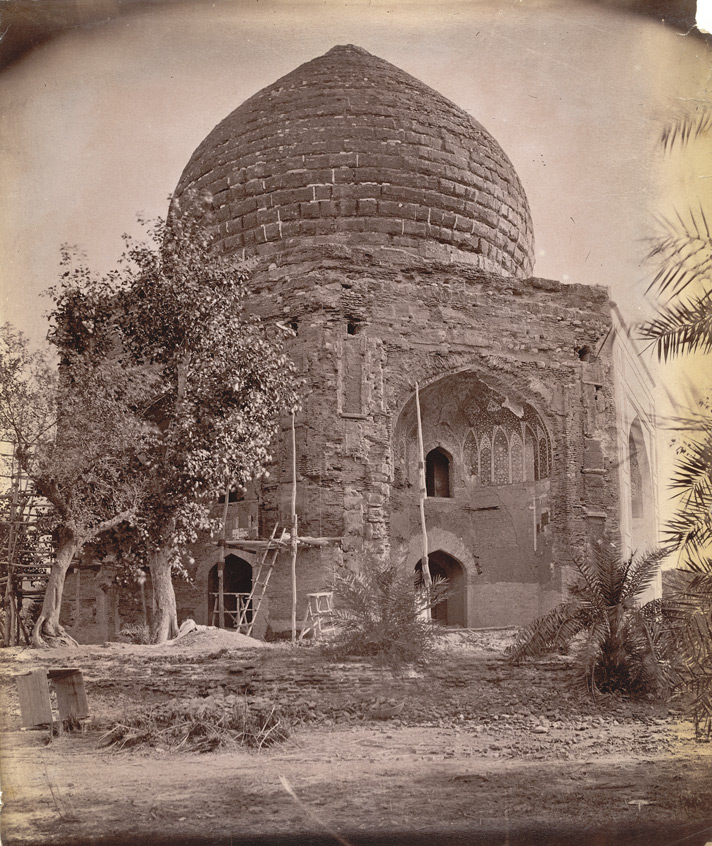
Historical photograph of the tomb, taken in 1880

Asif Khan was the brother of Empress Nur Jahan, and father of Arjumand Bano Begum, who became the consort of Shah Jahan under the name Mumtaz Mahal. In 1636, he was elevated as Khan-e-Khana and commander-in-chief and a year later became the governor of Lahore. Asif Khan died on 12 June 1641 in a battle against the forces of rebel Raja Jagat Singh. His tomb was commissioned to be built in the Shahdara Bagh tomb complex in Lahore by Shah Jahan.

== History ==
Emperor Shah Jahan commissioned the shrine following Khan's death in 1641. According to Abdul Hamid Lahori, author of the Padshahnama, the shrine was under construction for 4 years until 1645 at a cost of 300,000 rupees. The tomb was built directly west of the Tomb of Jahangir, and forms an axis with Jahangir's tomb that is interrupted by the Akbari Sarai.

The tomb was heavily damaged during the rule of the Sikh Empire. Lahore's first Sikh rulers, Gujjar Singh, Lahna Singh, and Subha Singh, are noted to have damaged the tomb, and planted large pipal trees next to the shrine that obstructed views of it. The trees were removed only in the British era.

The tomb was also plundered by the Sikhs in the 19th century for its marble and sandstone. Ranjit Singh was noted by British explorer William Moorcroft to have removed marble from the tomb's interior, exterior, as well as the various stones that were used to decorate the tomb. The plundered materials were then used to decorate the Golden Temple in Amritsar, as well as for use to build the Hazuri Bagh Baradari near the Lahore Fort.

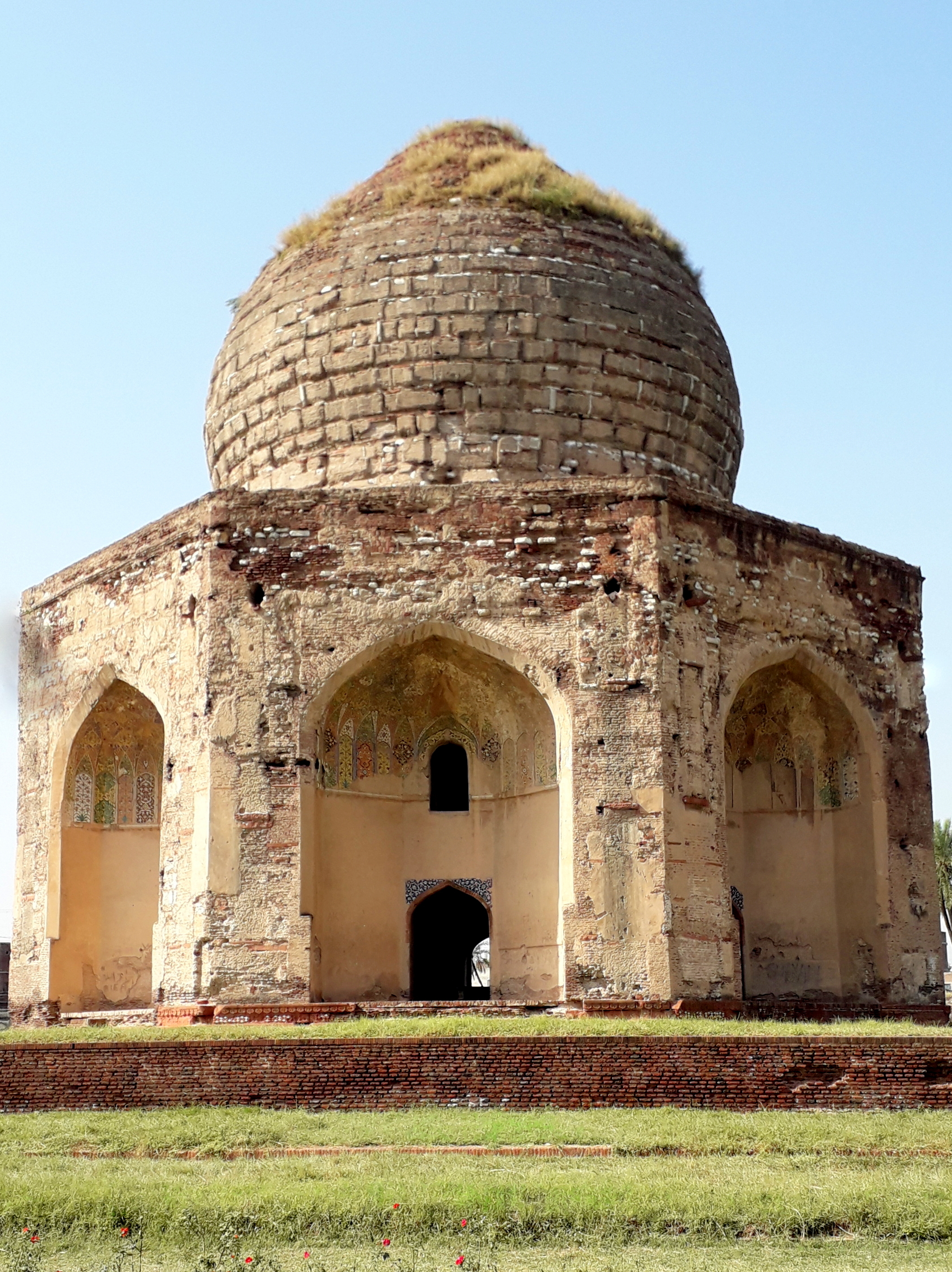
Asif Khan Tomb

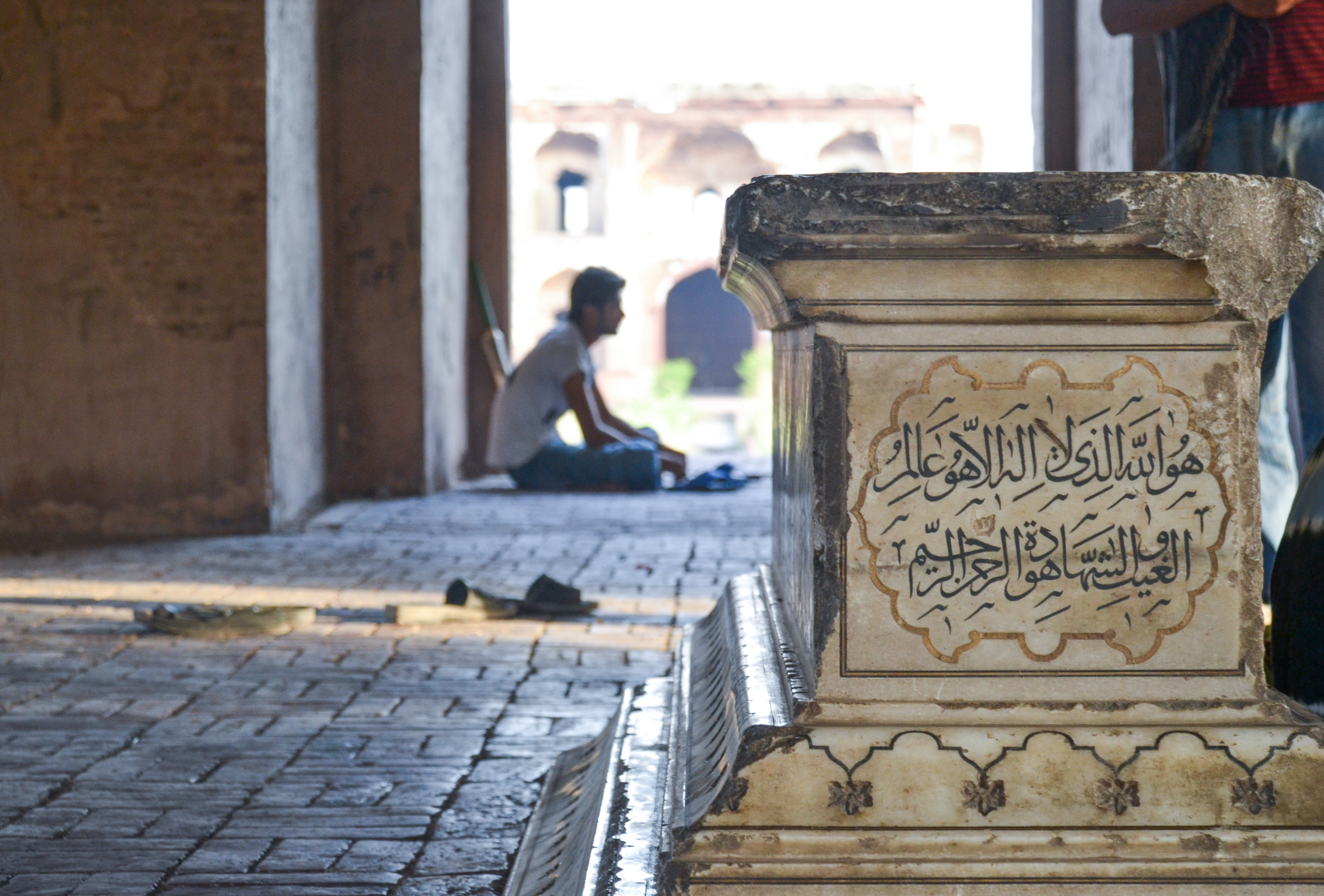
The marble cenotaph of Asif Khan

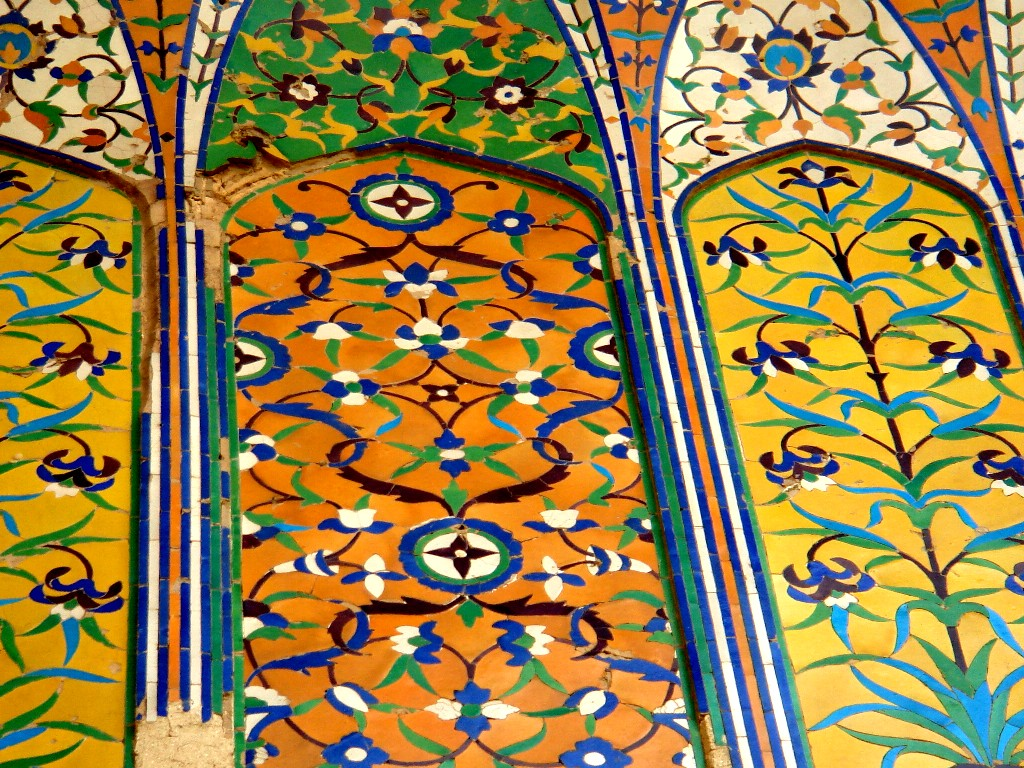
Some of the elaborate surviving tile work

== Layout ==
The tomb is built entirely of brick in an octagonal plan, and sits in the centre of a large quadrangle measure 300 yards on each side. The tomb is set upon a chabutra, or podium, that elevates the structure 3 feet 9 inches relative to the garden. Each side of the octagon measures 38 feet 8 inches,

Large gates exist in both northern and southern walls, though the tomb's main gate is the southern one. A small mosque is found in the eastern wall that was converted into a residence during the British period, while the western wall offers access to the Tomb of Jahangir via the Akbari Sarai.

Octagonal tombs were never used for emperors, but were commonly employed for burial of high-ranking noblemen such as Asif Khan. The floor of the platform on which the tomb stands was built with Sang-e Abri, or red limestone, while the outer walls were covered with red sandstone.

== Architecture ==
=== Exterior ===
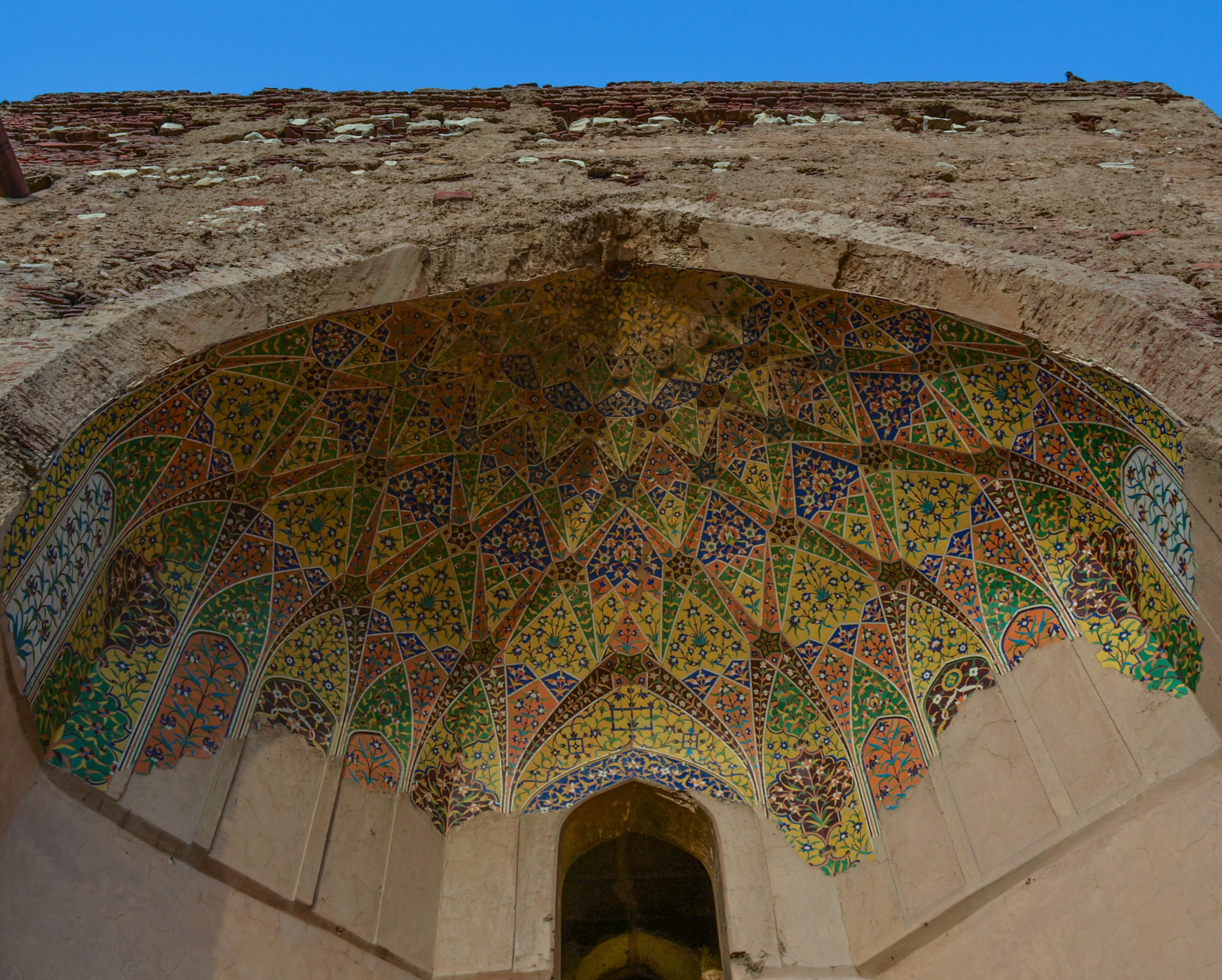
Some of the shrine's tile work still survives

At the time of its construction, the tomb was noted to feature some of the finest examples of building arts and crafts. The exterior originally was adorned with marble stone inlay work and veneered with stucco tracery, and blue kashi tiles typical of Lahore. The floors were decorated with marble, inlaid with precious stones. Each side of the tomb has a deeply recessed iwan, or alcove, with a door and arched window looking into the tomb.

=== Interior ===
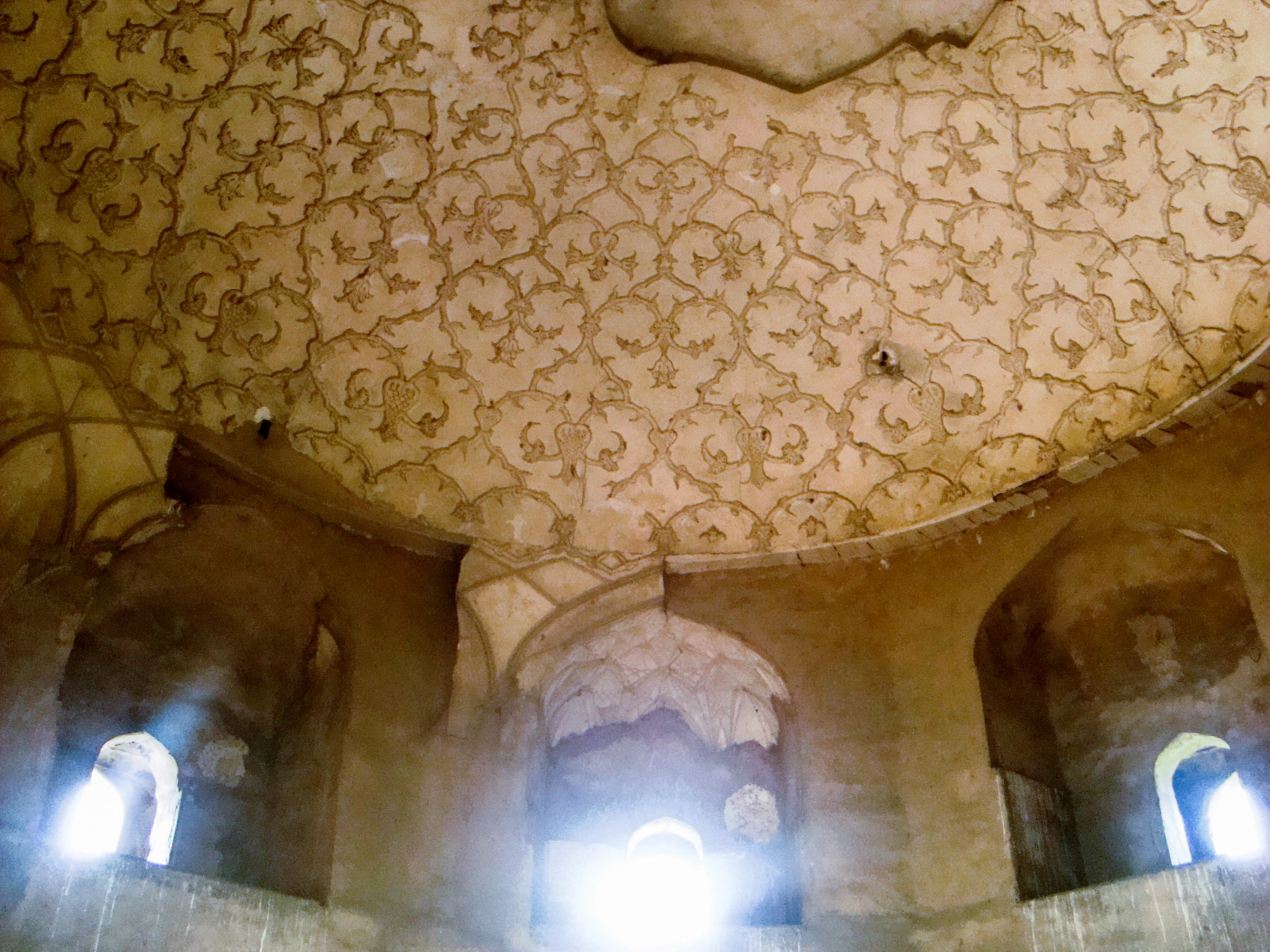
Some plasterwork still survives on the dome's underside

The tomb's interior features 8 portals that offer access to the interior from the outside. The interior was renowned for its lavish use of white marble and precious stone inlay, which has since disappeared. The inner dome ceiling is decorated in a high plaster relief of interlacing patterns, some of which still survives. The floor was once paved with red sandstone, though this was removed during the Sikh period.

The tomb contains a cenotaph made of pure marble, carved with inscriptions from the Qur'an, similar to that in Emperor Jahangir's adjacent tomb.

=== Dome ===
A large central double-layered brick bulbous dome rests atop the octagonal base. The bulbous dome that crowns the tomb was once covered in a marble veneer, and is of a shape that is unique among all Mughal structures. Such bulbous domes were an innovation of Shah Jahan's era, and were used to great effect at other sites such as the Taj Mahal in Agra.

=== Garden ===
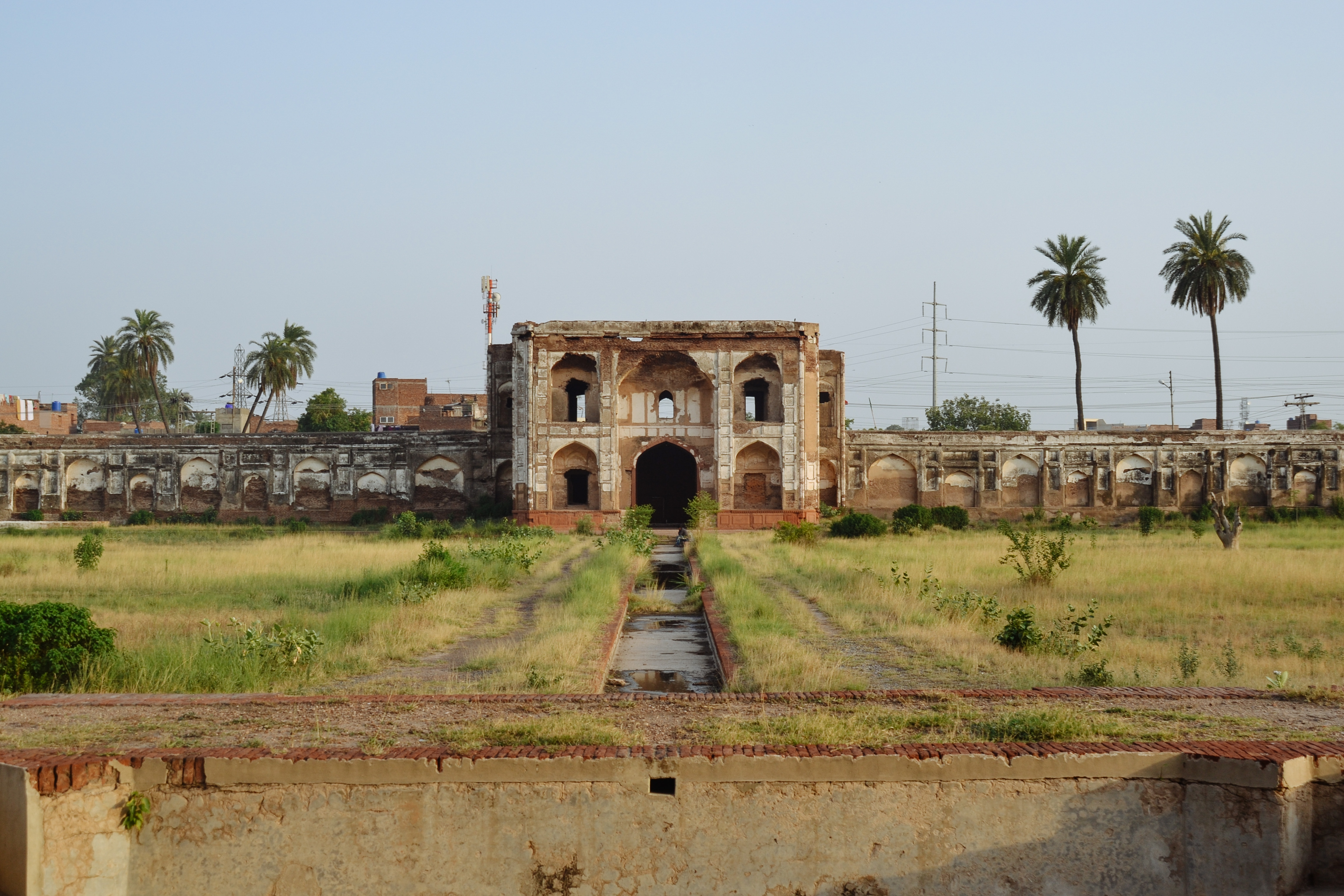
The tomb features a long pool in each of the 4 cardinal directions.

The tomb once had a water reservoir, which fed into fountains and pathways. The tomb is surrounded by a Persian-style Charbagh garden, with four long pools, or hauz, lined with walkways in each of the 4 cardinal directions.

=== Southern gate ===
The southern gate serves as the primary entrance in the tomb's garden complex. It is a double storied building built of brick that is roughly square in shape. The southern façade of the gateway was covered with red sandstone and white marble, while the other three sides featured decorated plasterwork.

The gate's interior features four small chambers, two of which are accessible by staircases. The central portion of the gateway features a two-story tall iwan portal that was finished with stucco work, with four smaller iwans flanking the central portal, divided into two levels. The flooring of the gateway features brickwork laid in a geometric design.

=== Jawab gate ===
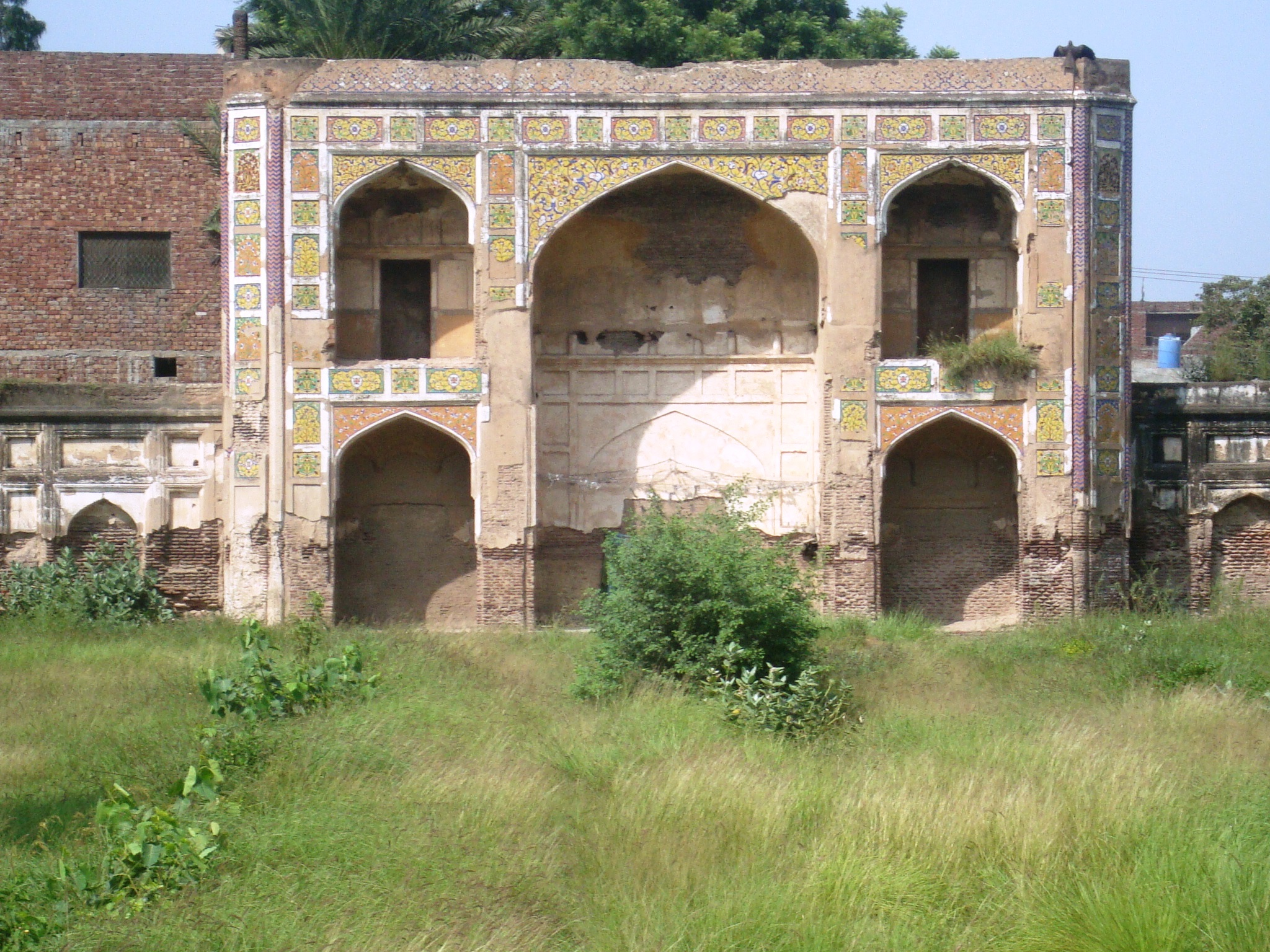
The jawab gate is embellished with tile-work

The northern edge of the complex's boundary walls features another large gateway. The gate is named the jawab, or "response", gate as a reference to the southern gate. It is also a two-story structure, with a central arched iwan portal flanked by four smaller portals. The façade of the gate was covered in intricate tile work, known as kashi kari, some of which still survives.

== Conservation ==
The tomb did not attract much attention from British colonial authorities, although a staircase in the shrine that had been destroyed by the Sikhs was rebuilt in 1905, while the floor's brick work and the ceiling's plasterwork were repaired. The shrine was protected by law for the first time in 1912 by British authorities. The gardens and its causeways were repaired by the British in 1920–21. The garden was further restored in 1924–25 and 1930–34.

Following independence, the tomb came under the management of Pakistan's Department of Archaeology. The southern walls at the tomb were swept away by flooding of the River Ravi in 1955, while further flood damage occurred in 1973. The tomb's southern walls were repaired in 1986–87.

Today, the tomb and the walls as well as the main gate are dilapidated. Though Pakistani law forbids construction of new buildings within 150 feet of heritage sites, the tomb's boundary walls are separated from private homes by a narrow street on its western and northern sides. Immediately north of the tomb is the shrine of Nim Pir, dating from the Mughal era.

Conservation work at the tomb resumed in 2005 with assistance from the Global Heritage Fund. The tomb, along with the adjacent Akbari Sarai and the Tomb of Jahangir, is on the tentative list as a UNESCO World Heritage Site.

== Gallery ==
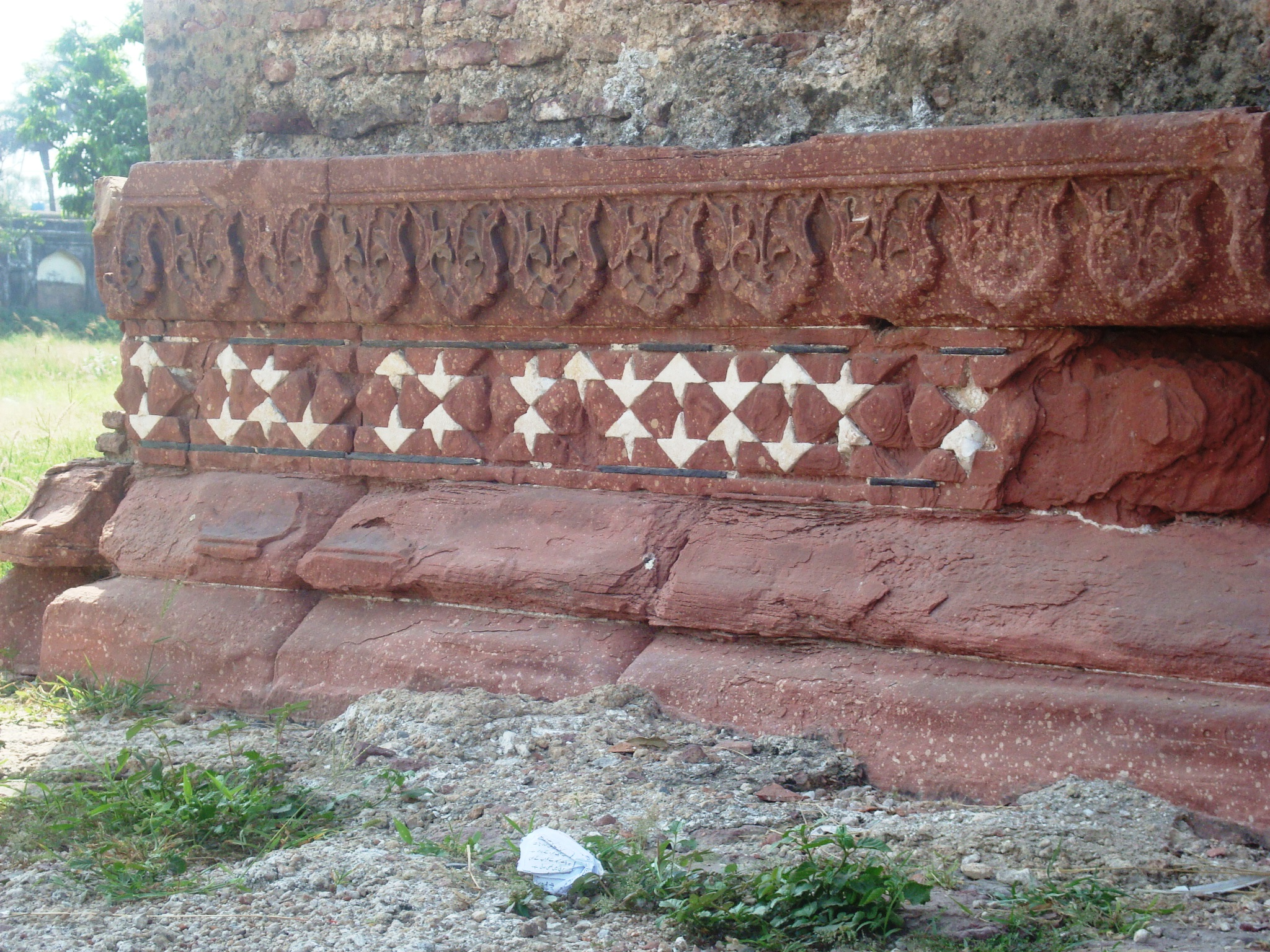
Some decorative elements on the southern gate still survive

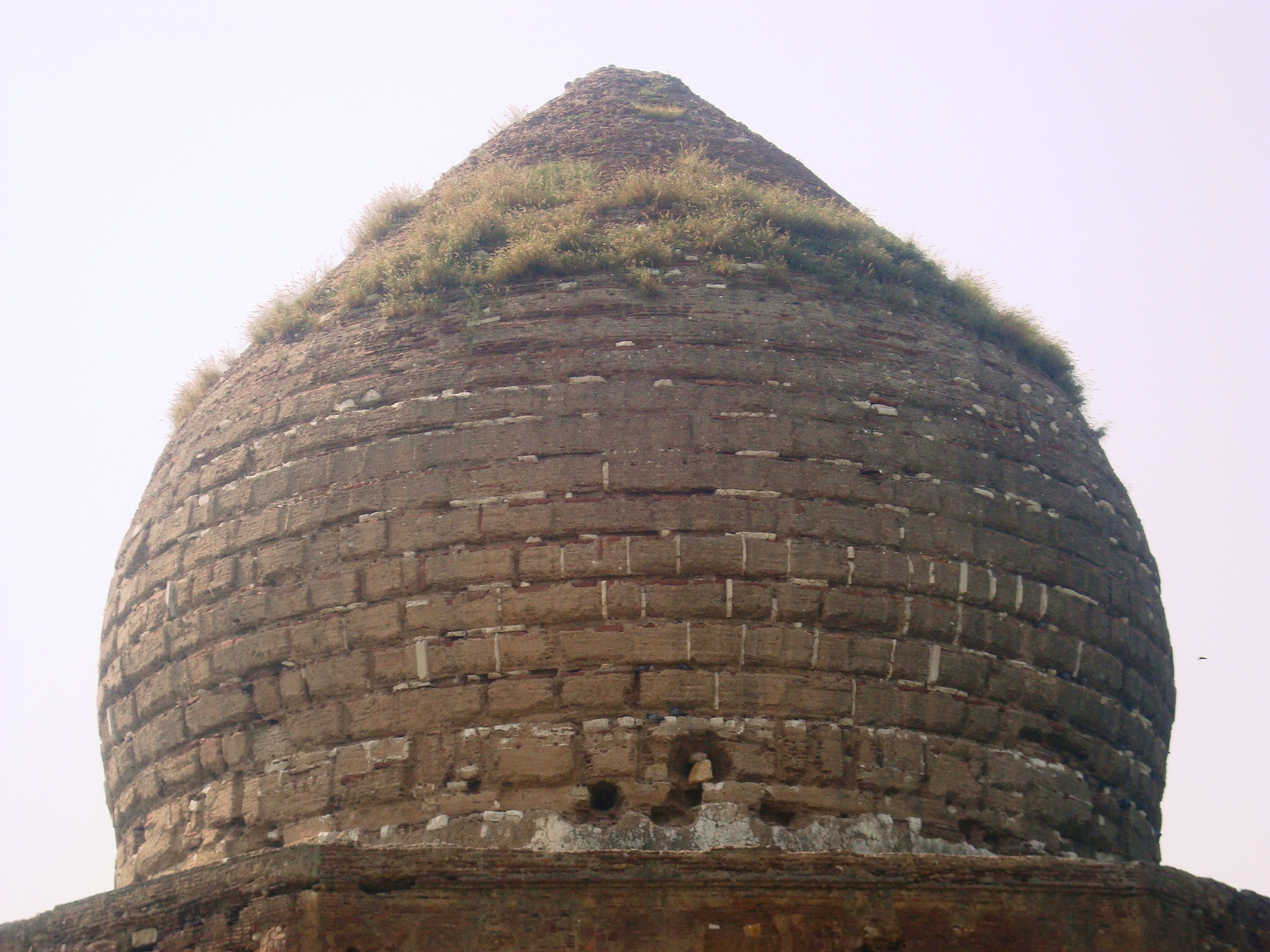
The tomb is noted for its unusually shaped bulbous dome

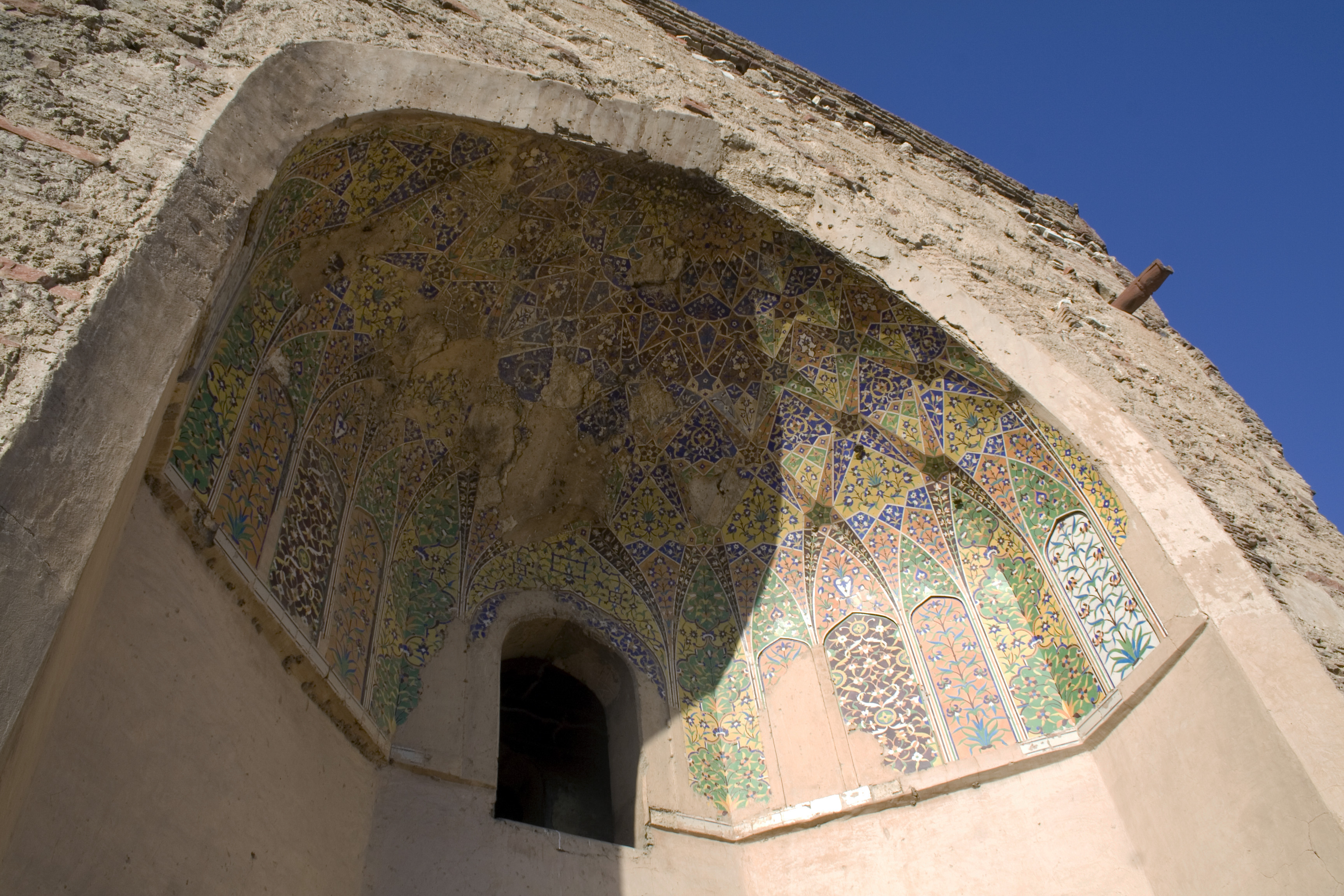
Muqarnas over the entrance to the tomb.

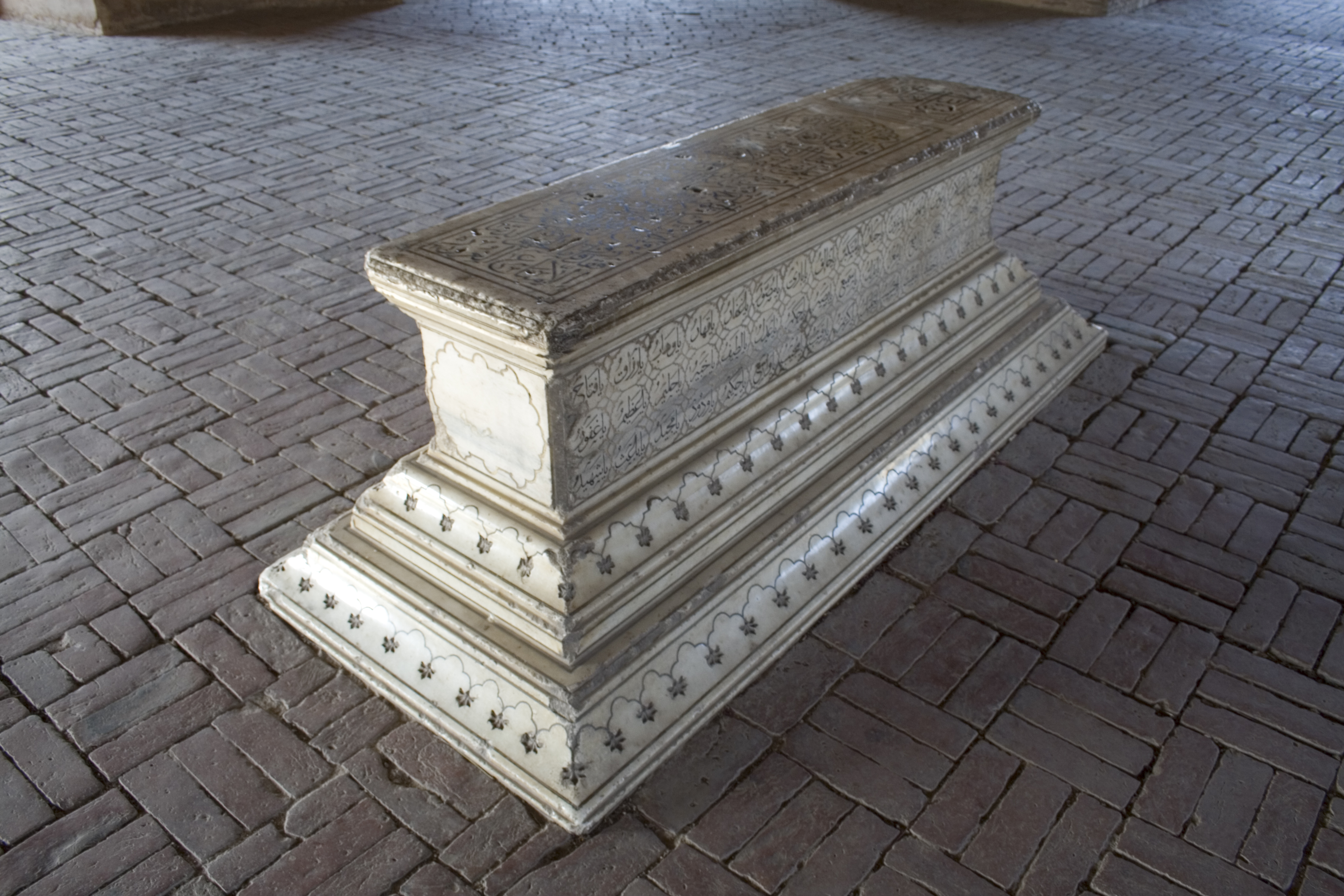
Cenotaph for Asif Khan

== See also ==
- Tomb of Jahangir
- Tomb of Muhammad Iqbal
- Tomb of Nur Jahan
