= Tomb of Nur Jahan =

Mausoleum in Lahore, Pakistan

Coordinates: 31.6209°N 74.2947°E

- مقبرۂ نورجہاں
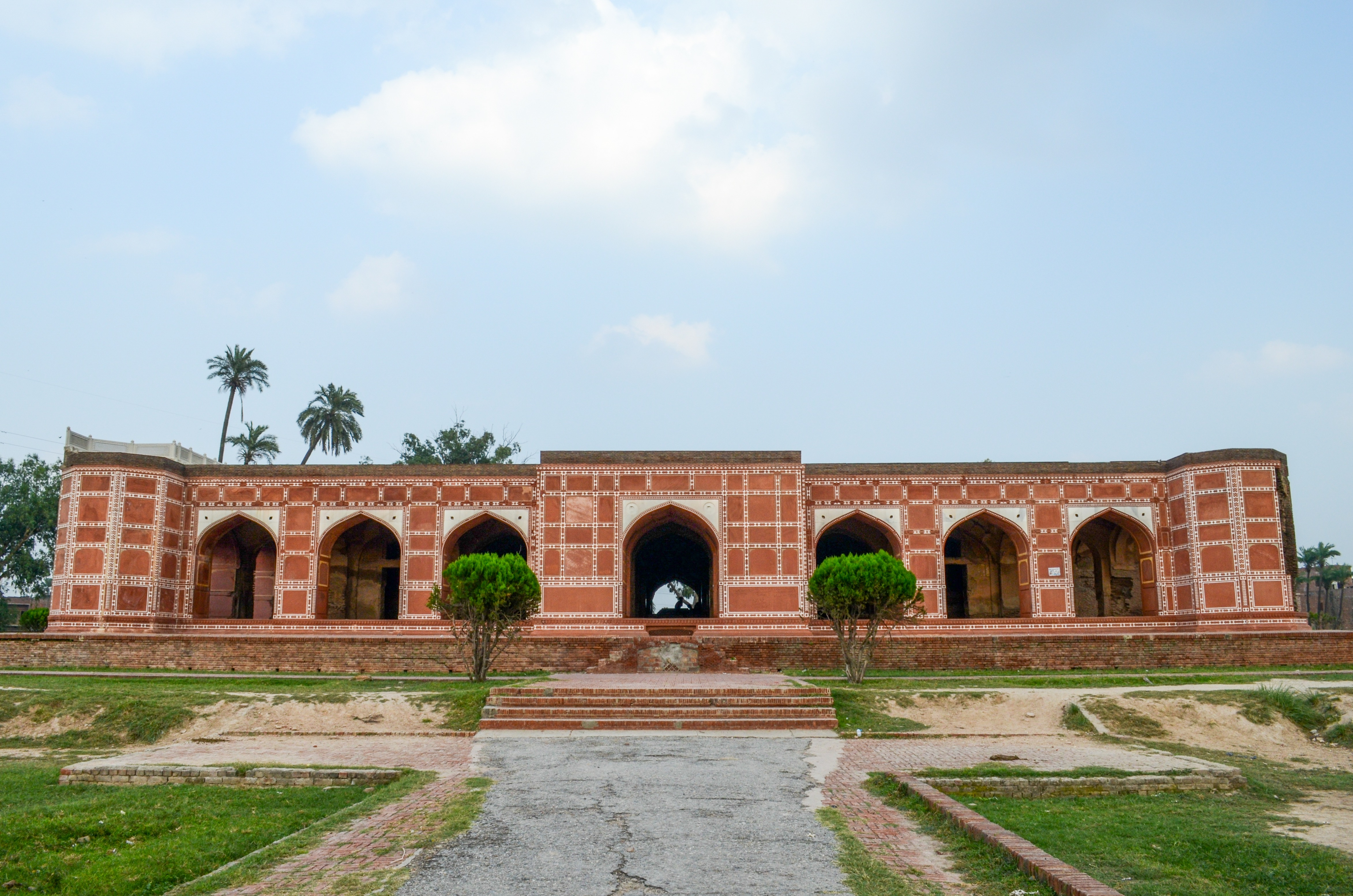
- The red sandstone tomb is decorated with pietra dura
- Interactive map of Tomb of Nur Jahan
- Location: Shahdara Bagh, Lahore, Punjab, Pakistan
- Type: Mausoleum

The Tomb of Nur Jahan (Urdu: مقبرۂ نورجہاں) is a 17th-century mausoleum in Lahore, Pakistan, that was built for the Mughal empress Nur Jahan. The tomb's marble was plundered during the Sikh Empire era in the 18th century for use at the Golden Temple in Amritsar. The red sandstone mausoleum, along with the nearby Tomb of Jahangir, Tomb of Asif Khan, and Akbari Sarai, forms part of an ensemble of Mughal monuments in Lahore's Shahdara Bagh.

== Location ==
The mausoleum is located in Shahdara Bagh, across the River Ravi from Lahore. The tomb is part of an ensemble of nearby monuments, including the Tomb of Jahangir, Akbari Sarai, as well as the tomb of Asif Khan. Nur Jahan's tomb was separated from the other monuments by open fields, which were later interrupted by construction of the Lahore-Peshawar Railway Line during the British era.

== Background ==
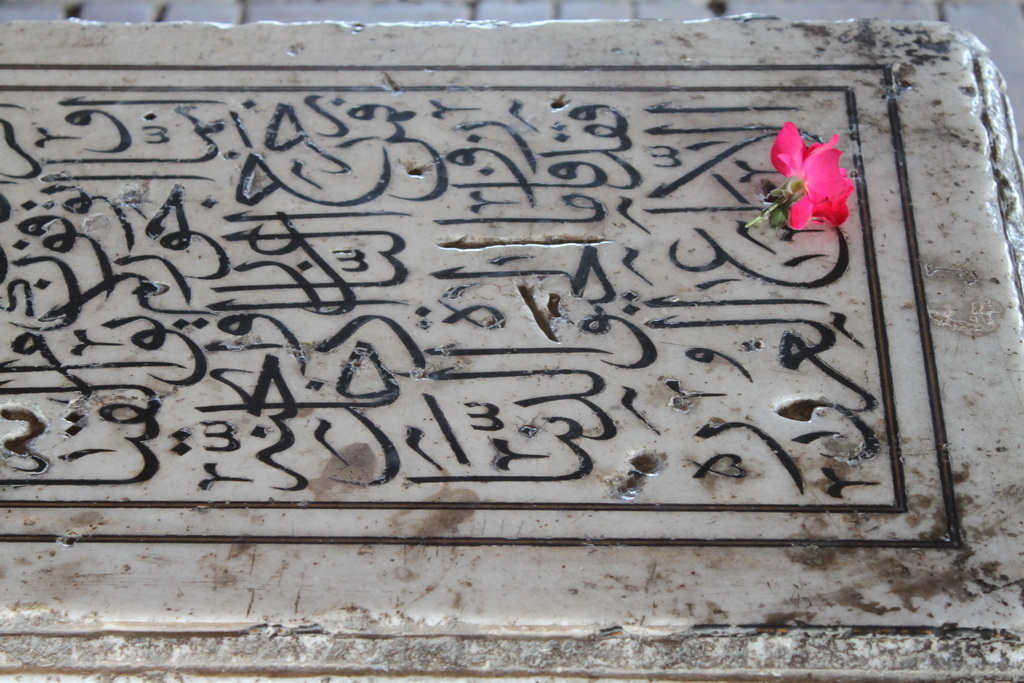
Verses of the Qur'an inlaid in marble on the cenotaph

Mehr-un-Nissa, bestowed with the title Nur Jahan, meaning "Light of the World," was the fourth child of Asmat Begam and her husband Mirza Ghiyas Beg, who had both immigrated from Persia. She was first married at the age of 17 to a Persian adventurer named Sher Afghan Ali Quli Khan Istajlu, who was renowned for his brilliant military career, and from whom she bore a daughter, Ladli Begum before he died in 1607. Her father served the Mughal emperor Akbar, who bestowed him with the title of Itimad-ud-daulah ("Pillar of the State"), while her brother Asaf Khan served her next husband, the Emperor Jahangir. Nur Jahan was the most powerful Mughal Empress.

== History ==
Having survived Jahangir by 18 years, she died at the age of 68 years and much of the mausoleum was most probably constructed during her lifetime. The tomb took four years to complete at the cost of Rupees three lakhs. Following the ascent of Shah Jahan to the Mughal throne, she was provided a yearly allowance of 200,000 rupees.

As with the Tomb of Asif Khan, Nur Jahan's tomb was stripped of its ornamental stones and marble during the occupation of Lahore by the army of Ranjit Singh. Much of the materials were used to decorate the Golden Temple in Amritsar.

The Shahdara ensemble of monuments, including the Nur Jahan tomb, suffered under British rule when a railway line was built between the tombs of Asif Khan and Nur Jahan. The tomb underwent minor repairs but is slated for major restoration.

== Architecture ==
The tomb was built on a podium, in the takhtgah style in which the podium serves as the takht, or "throne." With a platform measuring 158 square feet, the tomb is in the shape of a square and measures 124 feet on each side, and is 19.6 feet high. Minarets may previously have risen from the corners of the mausoleum, similar to the nearby Tomb of Jahangir.

=== Exterior ===
Unlike her father's tomb (tomb of I'timād-ud-Daulah), which was constructed in white marble, Nur Jahan's mausoleum is primarily clad in red sandstone, with a flat roofline similar to that of her husband's tomb. The exterior features 7 vaulted arches, which were covered with marble and wrought with flower mosaics in semi-precious stones. The central arch on each side protrudes out from the 3 flanking vaulted arches. Minute paneling was executed in intricate patterns and cornices are honeycomb shaped in several rooms. The inner floor is covered with marble and the outer platform with sandstone. The exterior, encased in red sandstone, was inlaid with floral motifs in addition to white, black and yellow marble. Turtle

=== Interior ===
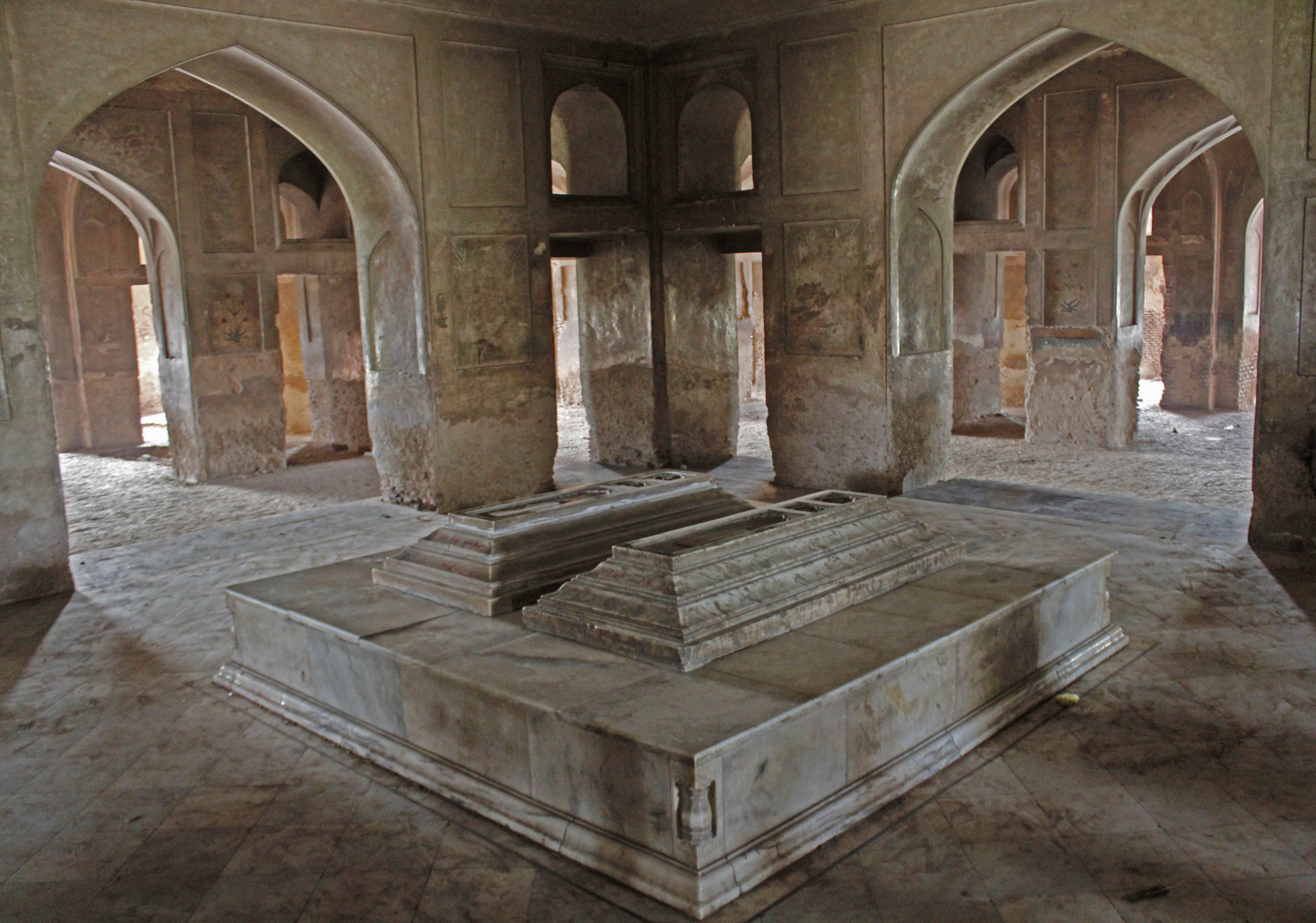
Marble cenotaphs of Nur Jahan and her daughter Ladli Begum

The central vaulted chamber of the tomb contains a marble platform with two cenotaphs, one that commemorates Nur Jahan and the other to commemorate her daughter, Ladli Begum. Built by Hakim Ajmal, Khan of Delhi in 1912, the original marble sarcophagus bears ornate workmanship and the name of Allah, in the same style and size as seen in the tombs of Jahangir and Asif Khan. On her tomb is inscribed an epitaph: "On the grave of this poor stranger, let there be neither lamp nor rose. Let neither butterfly's wing burn nor nightingale sing".

=== Gardens ===
The tomb stands in the centre of a Persian-style Charbagh. The original garden no longer survives, but once included tulips, roses, and jasmine.

== Gallery ==
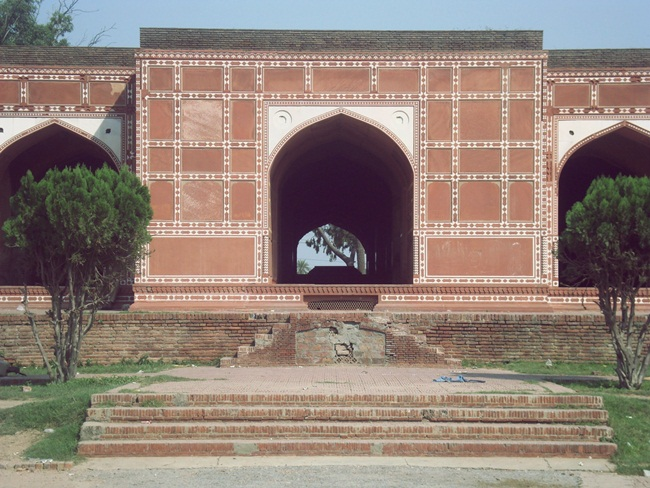
The tomb's façade is decorated with pietra dura

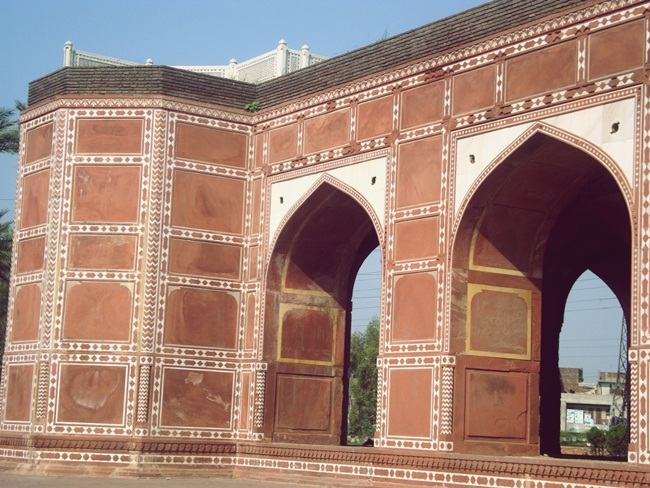

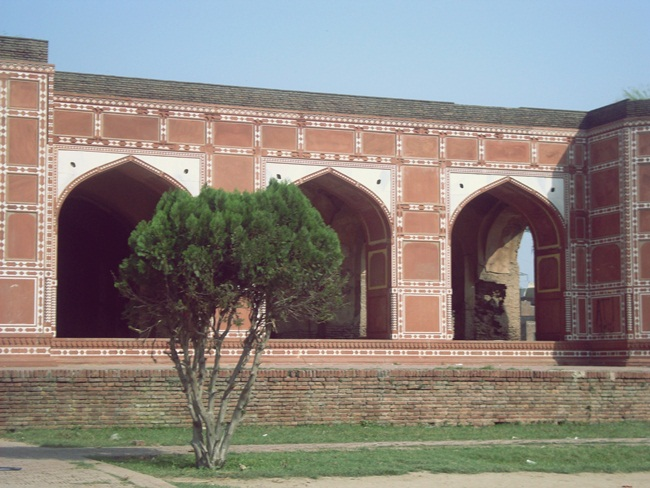

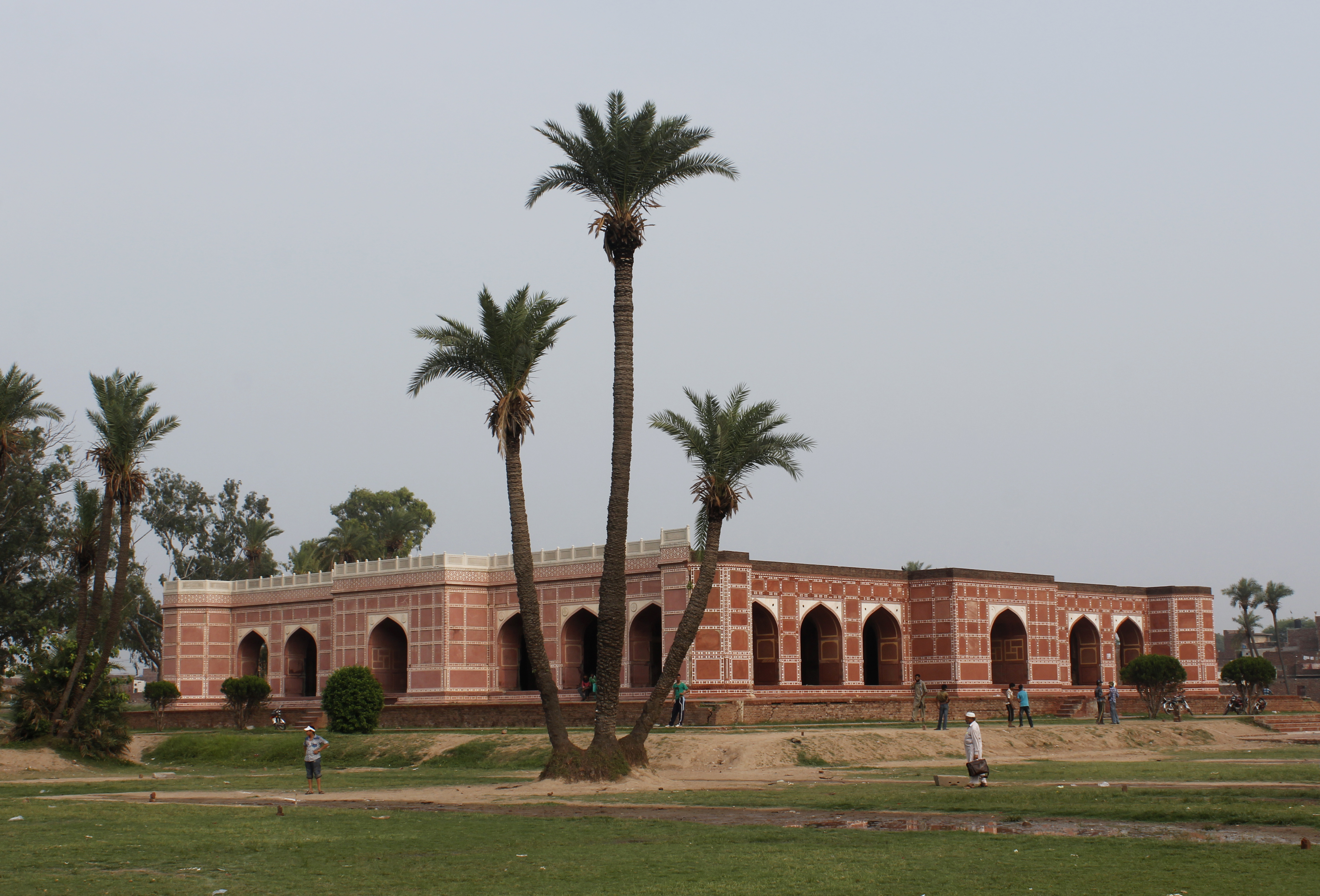

== See also ==
- Tomb of Asif Khan
- Tomb of Jahangir
- Tomb of Muhammad Iqbal
- Tomb of Jalaluddin Mohammed Akbar
- Tomb of Mariam uz-Zamani, resting place of Empress Wali Nimat Mariam uz-Zamani, favorite Queen consort of Emperor Akbar.
- Bibi Ka Maqbara, the tomb of Dilras Banu Begum, consort of Emperor Aurangzeb.
- Lal Bangla, the tomb of Lal Kunwar, the mother of Shah Alam II
