= Tomb of Allama Iqbal =

Mausoleum of Muhammad Iqbal in Lahore, Pakistan

Coordinates: 31.5879°N 74.3113°E

- مزارِ اقبال (Urdu)
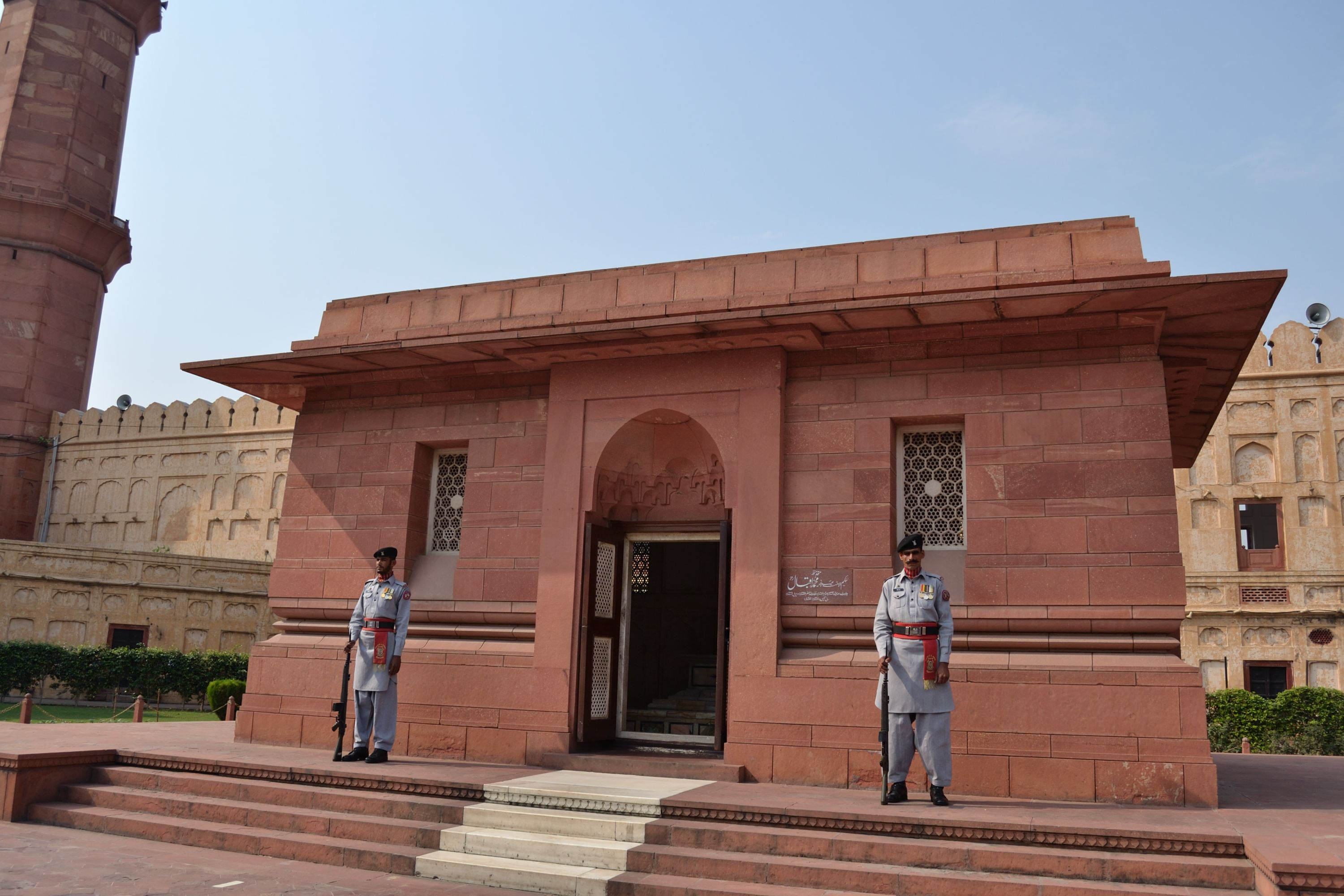
- The mausoleum with Badshahi Mosque in the background
- Interactive map of the Tomb of Allama Iqbal area
- Former names: Mahmood

General information
- Type: Mausoleum
- Architectural style: Mughal
- Location: Lahore, Punjab, Pakistan

Design and construction
- Architect: Nawab Zain Yar Jang Bahadur

The Tomb of Allama Iqbal or Mazar-e-Iqbal (Urdu: مزارِ اقبال) is the final resting place of Muhammad Iqbal, the national poet of Pakistan. Designed in the Mughal architectural style, the mausoleum is located next to the walls of the iconic Mughal-era Badshahi Mosque, within the Hazuri Bagh in Lahore, Punjab, Pakistan.

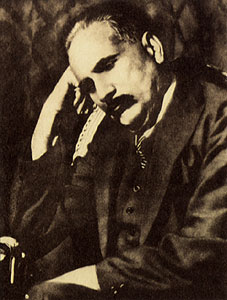
Muhammad Iqbal, then president of the Muslim League in 1930 and address deliverer.

== Background ==
Iqbal was one of the major inspirations behind the Pakistan Movement, and is revered in Pakistan as the Mufakkir-e-Pakistan (the Thinker of Pakistan) and Shair-e-Mashriq (the Poet of the East). Iqbal died on 21 April 1938 in Lahore at the age of 60. Thousands of visitors come to the mausoleum every day to pay their respects to the poet-philosopher. It is said that Mustafa Kemal Atatürk (the founder and first president of Turkey) had sent earth collected from the tomb of Jalal ad-Din Muhammad Rumi (whom Iqbal regarded as his spiritual mentor) to be sprinkled on this grave.

== History ==
Soon after Iqbal's death in April 1938, a committee was formed that was presided over by Chaudhary Mohammed Hussain.

A major problem in the realisation of this monument was a lack adequate funds. The committee resolved not to accept any donations from the local governments and state rulers, and so funds were raised through the contributions from Iqbal's friends, admirers and disciples.

== Architecture ==
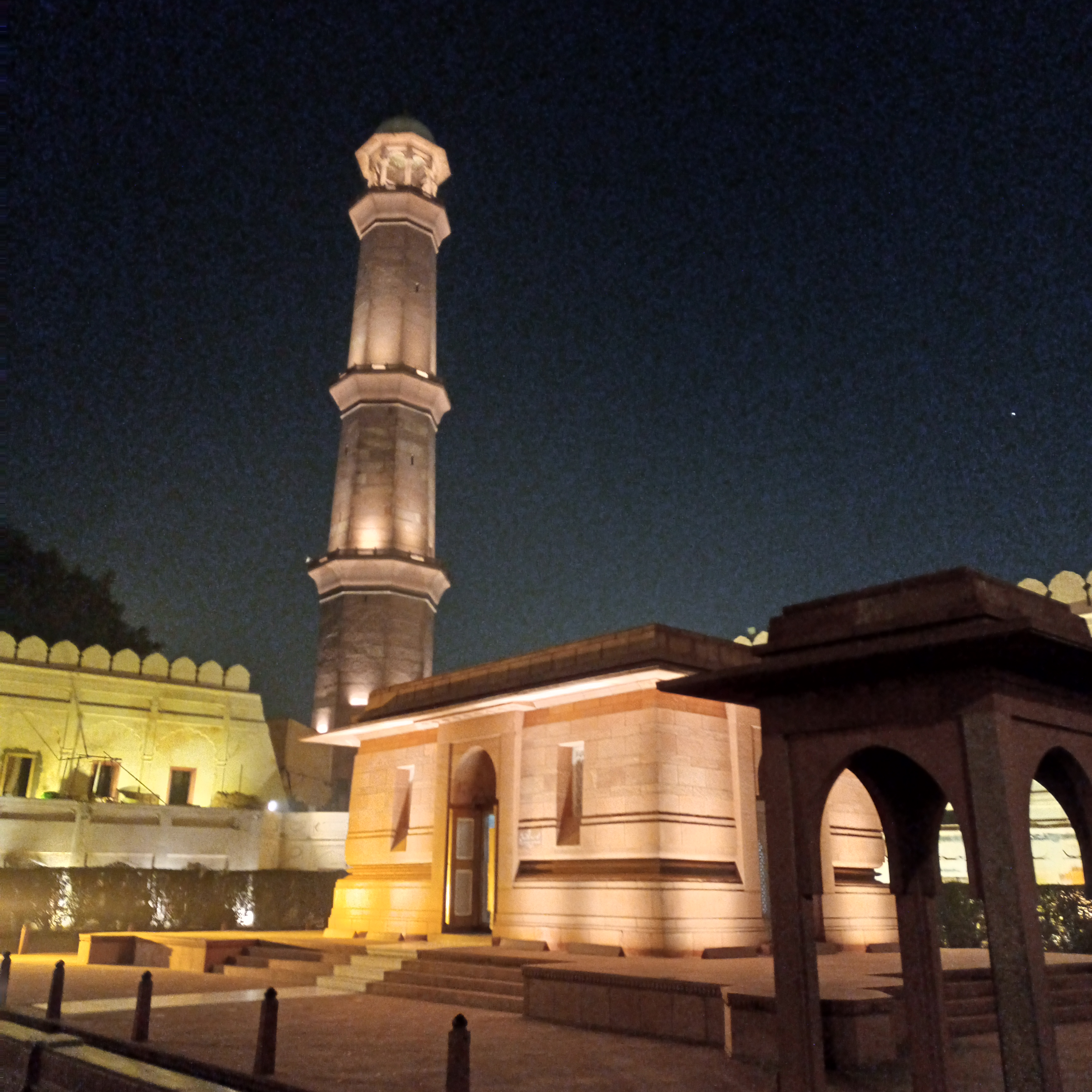
Evening view of Mazar-e-Iqbal.

The architecture has a combination of styles; however, it reflects mainly the Mughal style. The structure is entirely constructed of red sandstone, which was brought from Jaipur, British India, and building marble from Makrana, Rajputana. After the independence of Pakistan in 1947, construction was affected due to export restrictions of red stone from India. Six couplets of a ghazal are carved from Iqbal's poetical work Zabur-e-Ajam (Persian Psalms) on the mausoleum's interior surfaces. Outside, there is a small garden, distributed into small plots. The mausoleum was designed by Hyderabad Deccan's then Chief Architect, Nawab Zain Yar Jang Bahadur and took thirteen years to build at a cost of about one hundred thousand (Rs. 100,000) Pakistani rupees. The major reason for delay was the stoppage of red-stone from Jaipur in post-independence India.

=== Grave and cenotaph ===
The rectangular mausoleum has two gates at the eastern and southern side respectively, inlaid with marble, while the cenotaph itself is made of white marble. The tombstone was a gift from the people of Afghanistan, and is made of lapis lazuli and inscribed with Quranic verses in calligraphy inscribed in Afghanistan.

== Conservation ==
The tomb complex is listed on the Protected Heritage Monuments of the Archaeology Department of Punjab.

== Gallery ==
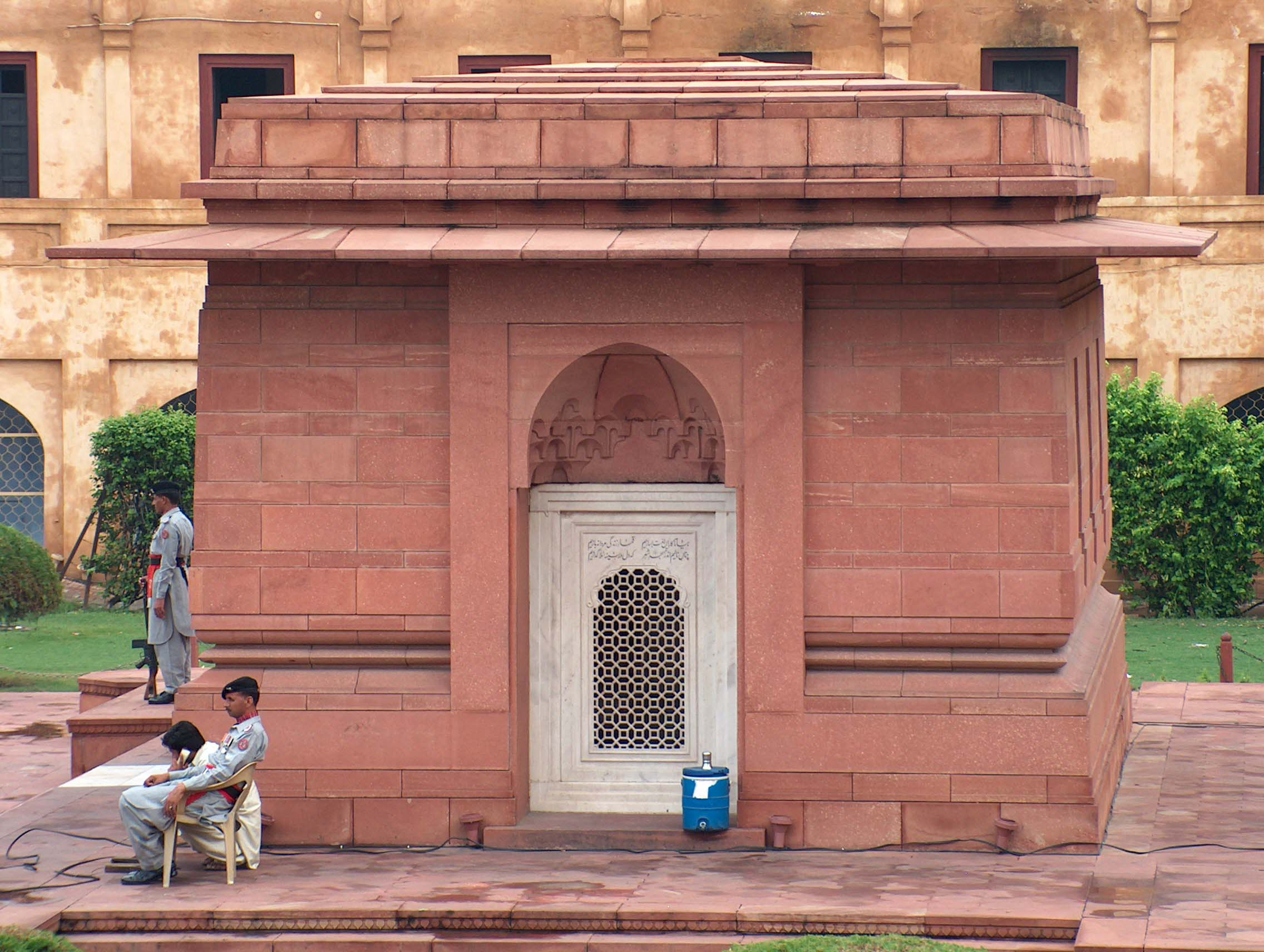
North wall of the mausoleum

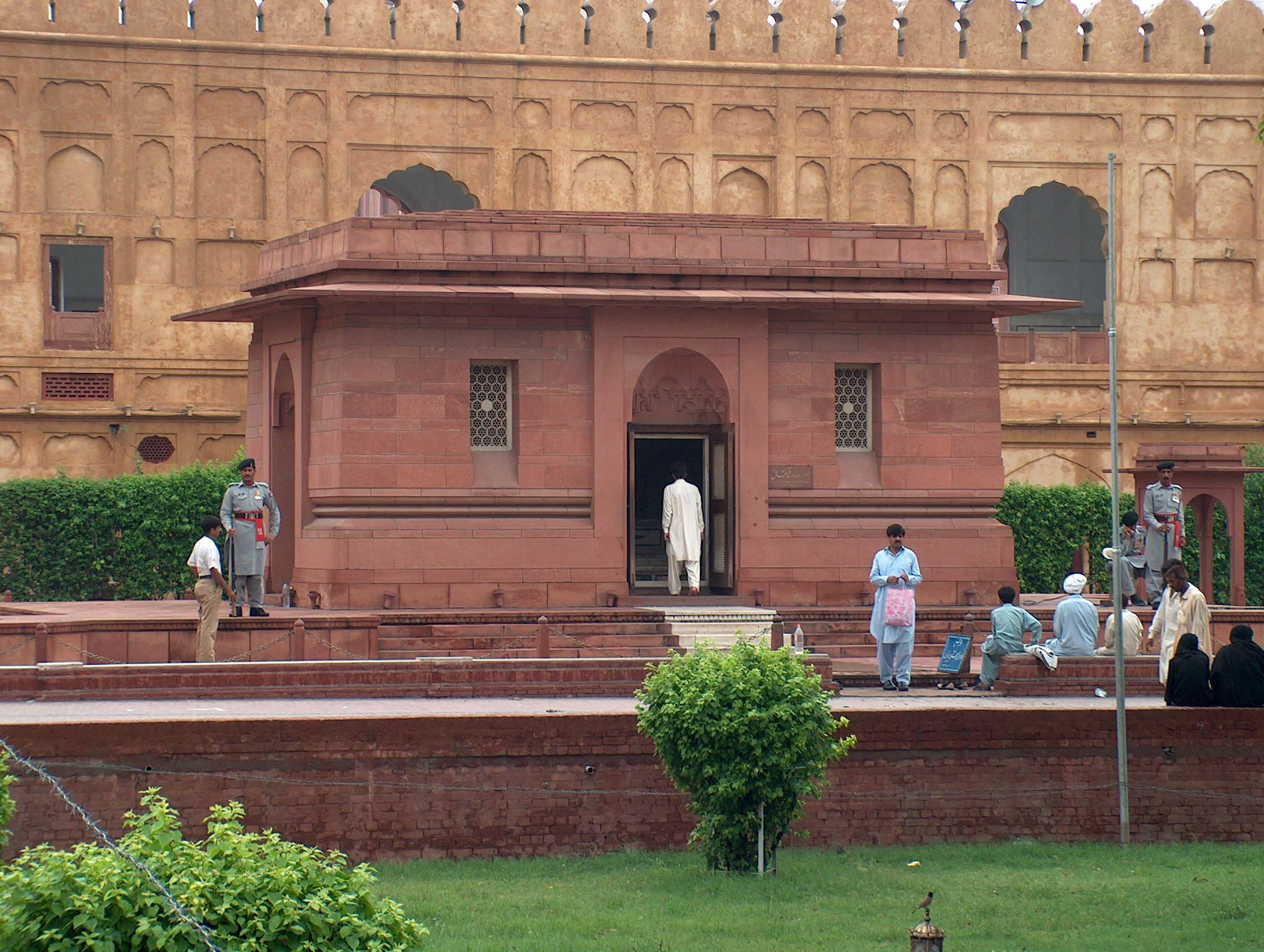
South East side of the mausoleum

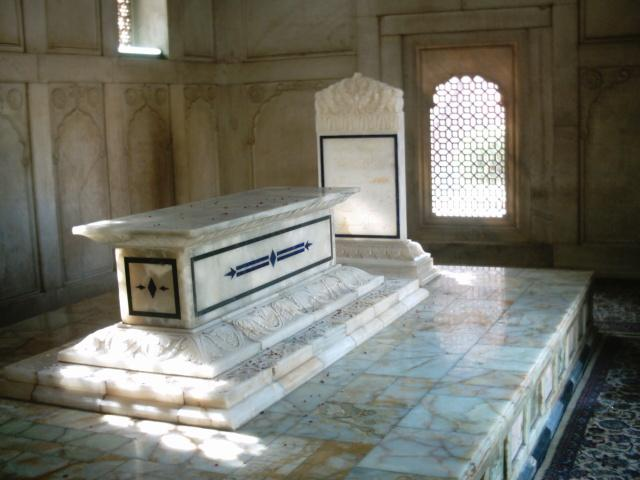
Inside Iqbal's mausoleum, a marble cenotaph

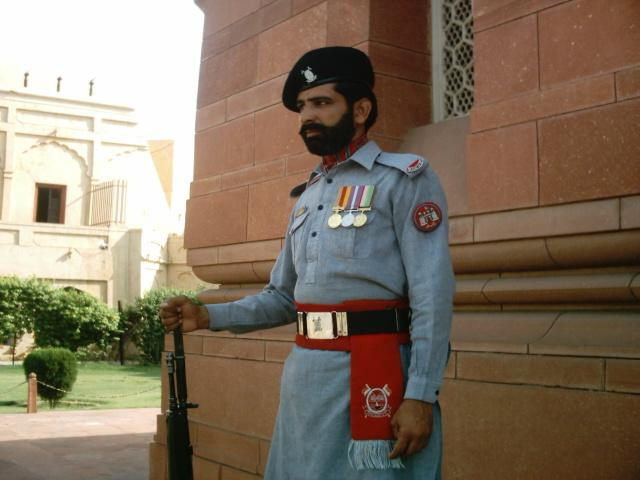
Guard at the mausoleum, with Lahore Fort in background

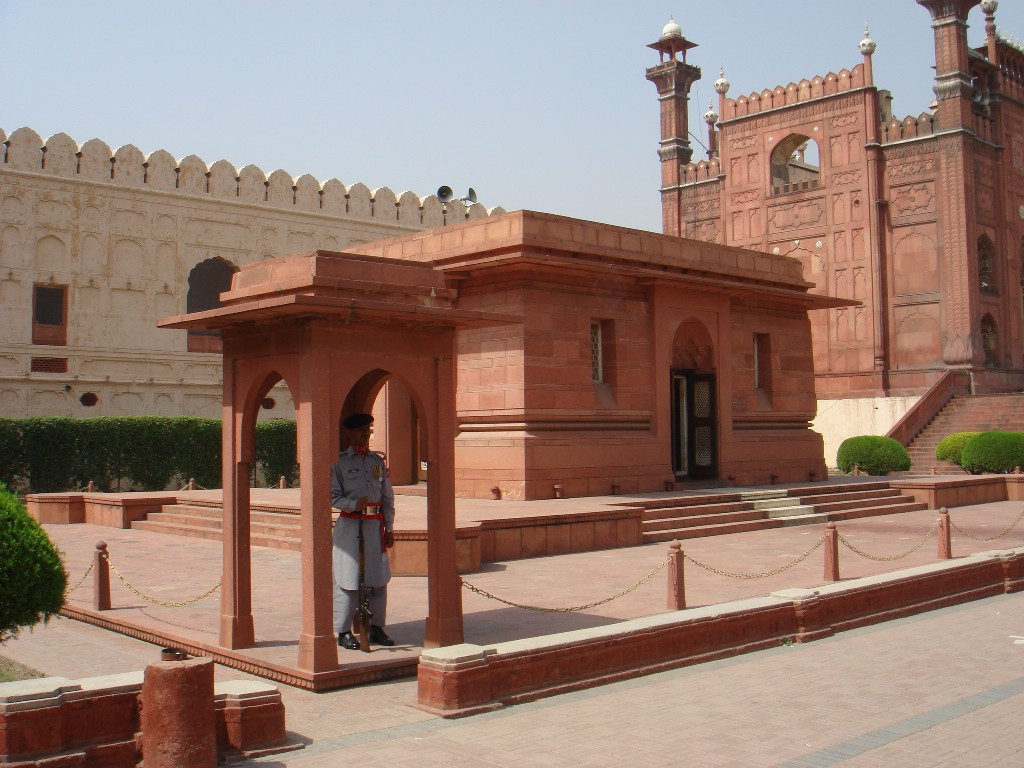
Iqbal's mausoleum adjacent to the Badshahi Mosque's gateway

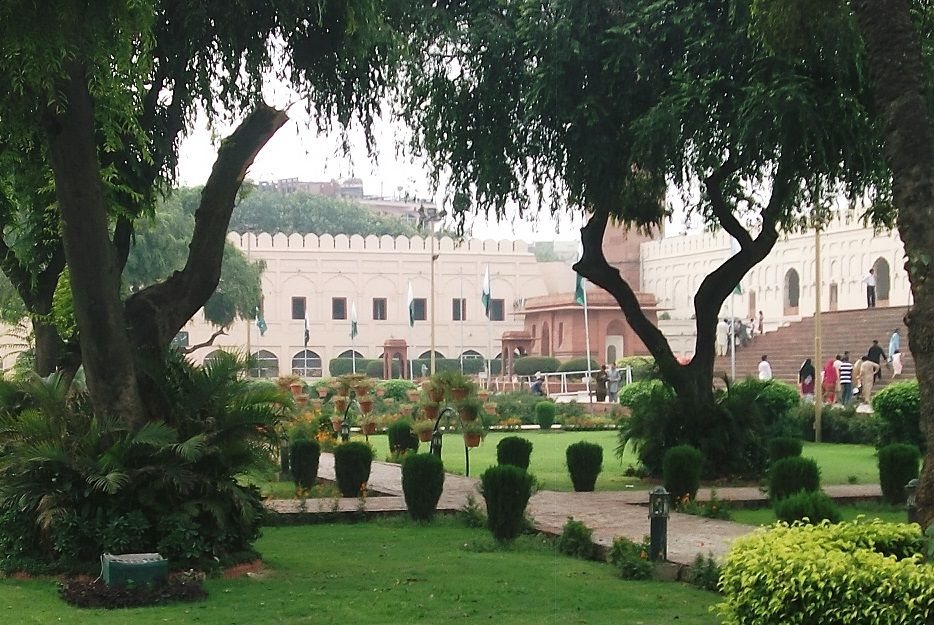
Tomb of Muhammad Iqbal

== See also ==
- Tomb of Asif Khan
- Tomb of Jahangir
- Tomb of Nur Jahan
- Iqbaliat
- Category:Iqbal scholars
- List of mausolea
