= Tomb of Jahangir =

1637 mausoleum for Mughal Emperor Jahangir in Lahore, Pakistan

- جہانگیر دا مقبرہ مقبرۂ جہانگیر
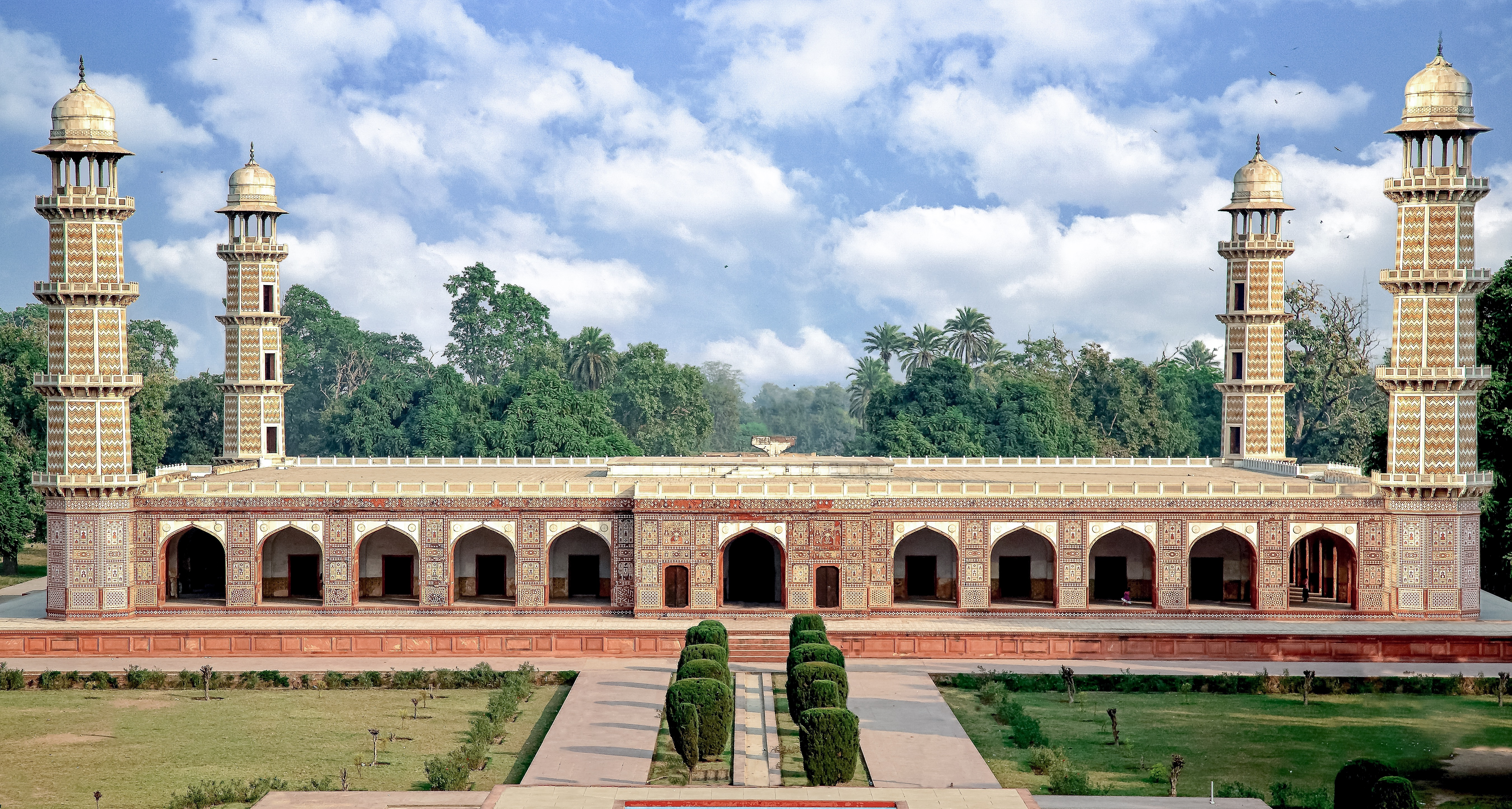
- Interactive map of Tomb of Jahangir
- Location: Lahore, Punjab, Pakistan
- Coordinates: 31.6225°N 74.3032°E
- Type: Mausoleum
- Completion date: 1637; 389 years ago

The Mughal emperor Jahangir is buried in a mausoleum dating from 1637 in Shahdara Bagh, along the western bank of the Ravi River, in Lahore, Punjab, Pakistan. The site is famous for its interiors that are extensively embellished with frescoes and marble, and its exterior that is richly decorated with pietra dura. The tomb, along with the adjacent Akbari Sarai and the Tomb of Asif Khan, are part of an ensemble currently on the tentative list for UNESCO World Heritage status.

== Location ==
The tomb is located in Shahdara Bagh, northwest of the Walled City of Lahore. The tomb is located across the River Ravi from Lahore, in what was a rural area known for its numerous pleasure gardens. The tomb is located in Jahangir's pleasure garden, the Dilkusha Garden, which had been laid out in 1557. The Tomb of Asif Khan, built-in 1645, and the Akbari Sarai, built-in 1637, are located immediately west of Jahangir's tomb complex, and the three form an ensemble oriented on an east-west axis. The last of the Shahdara Bagh monuments, the tomb of Jahangir's wife Nur Jahan is located slightly southwest of Asif Khan's tomb.

== Background ==
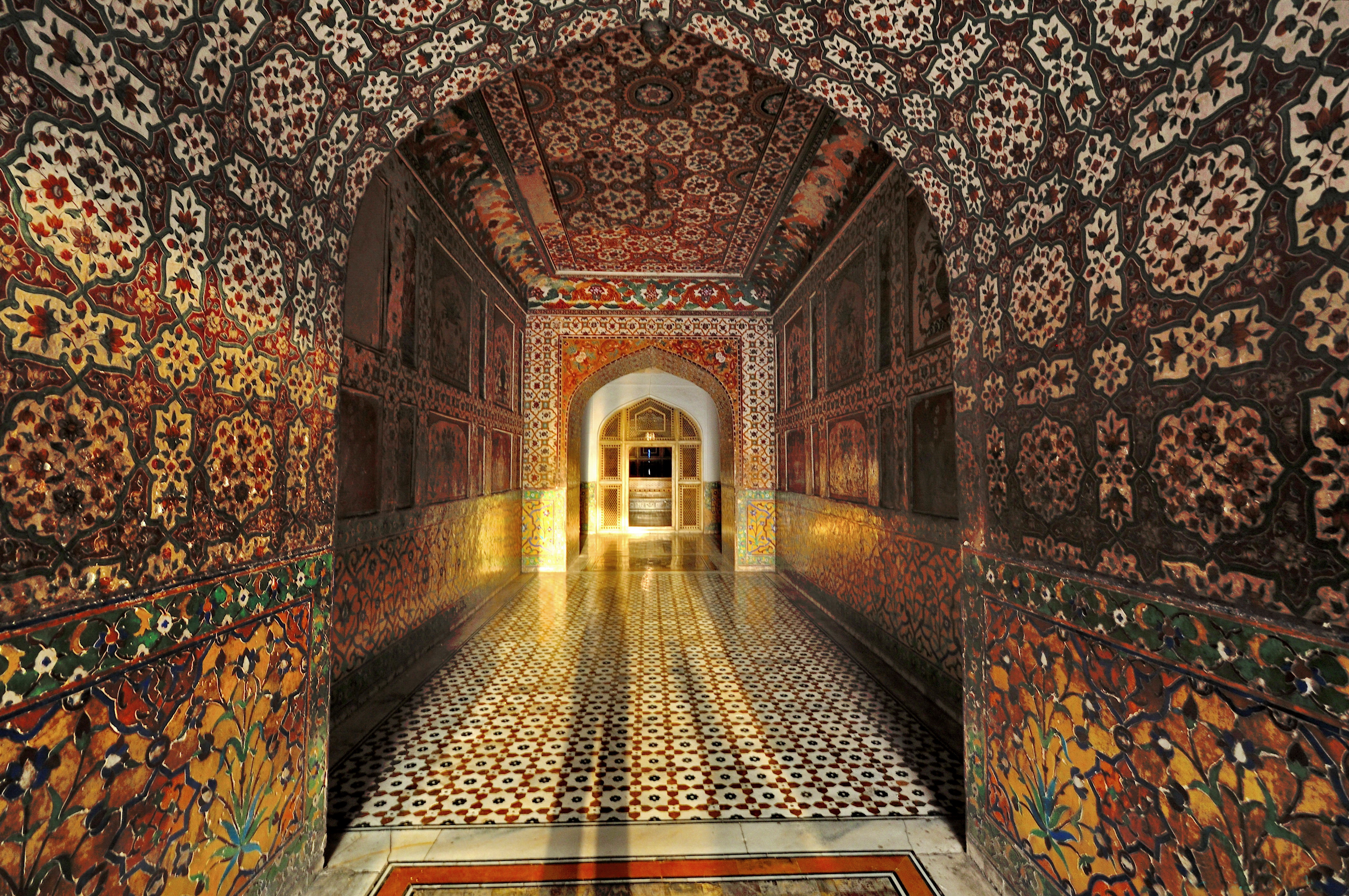
Much of the mausoleum's interior is adorned with Mughal-era frescoes.

The tomb was built for Emperor Jahangir, who ruled the Mughal Empire from 1605 to 1627 C.E. The emperor died in the foothills of Kashmir near the town of Rajauri on 28 October 1627. A funeral procession transferred his body from Kashmir and arrived in Lahore on Friday, 12 November 1627. The Dilkusha Garden in which he was buried was a "favourite spot" of Jahangir when he lived in Lahore. His son, the new Mughal Emperor Shah Jahan, ordered that a "mausoleum befitting an Emperor" should be built in his father's honour to inter his remains.

== History ==
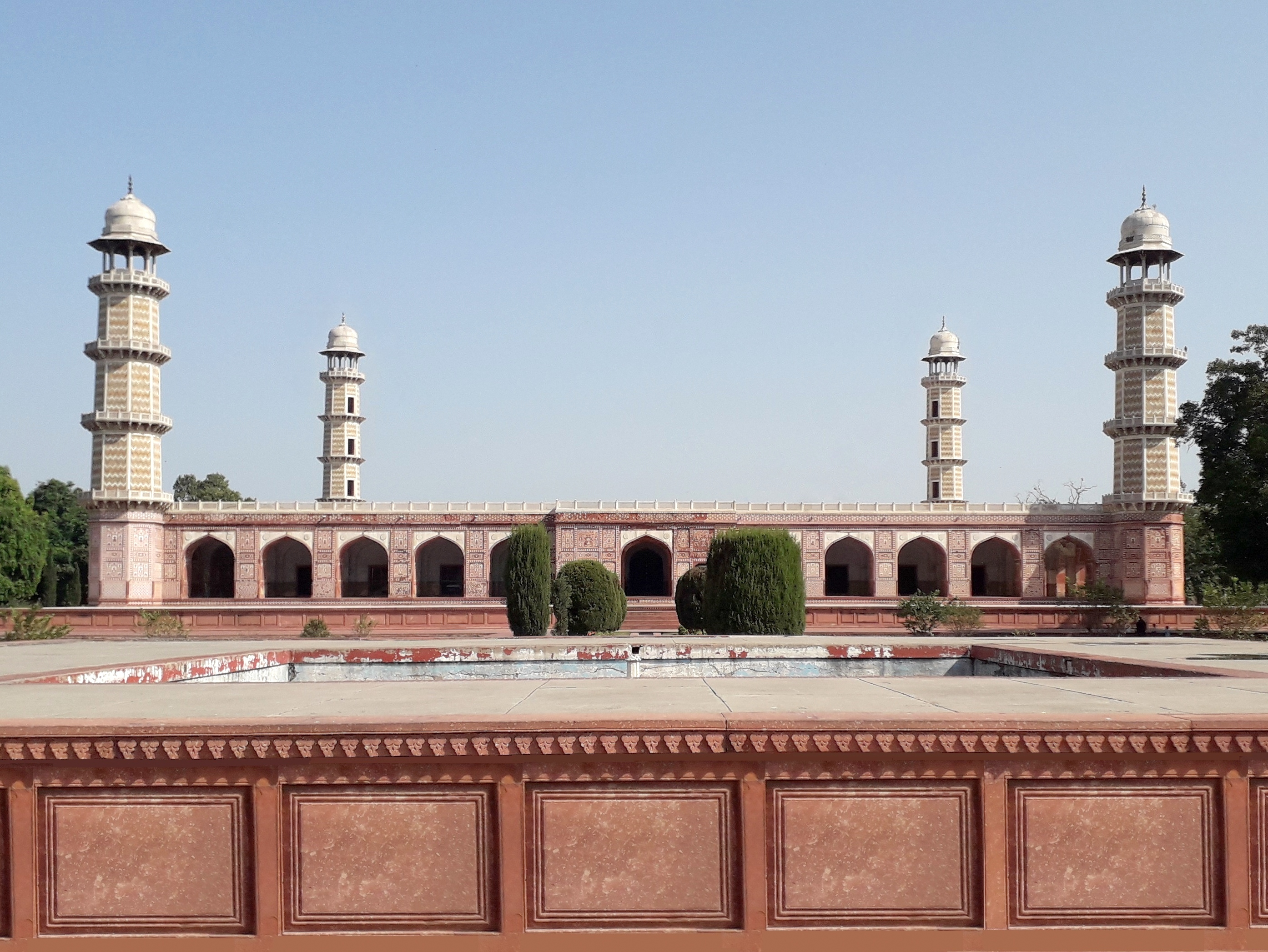
Tomb from a distance

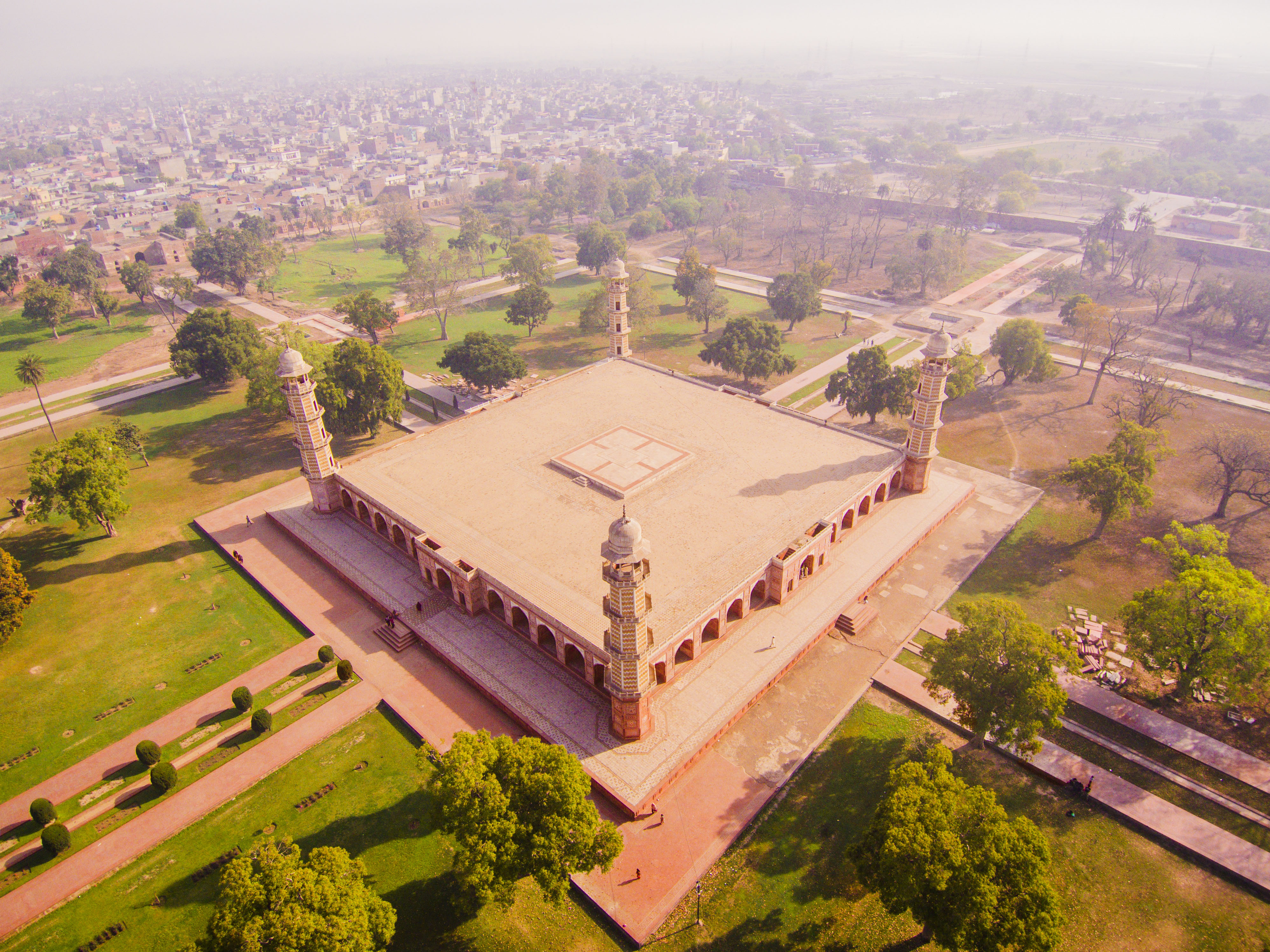
Emperor Jahangir forbade the construction of a dome over his tomb

Though contemporary historians attribute the construction of the tomb to Jahangir's son Shah Jahan. Construction started in 1627, requiring ten years for completion, and cost Rs 10 Lakh.

Repair works were undertaken at the tomb in 1814 according to Sikh court records. However, the tomb complex was also desecrated under Sikh rule when it was pillaged by the army of Ranjit Singh, with building materials taken for use in decorating the Golden Temple in Amritsar. The pillaged grounds were then converted for use as a private residence for an officer in the army of Ranjit Singh, Señor Oms, who was also known as Musa Sahib. Ranjit Singh further desecrated the mausoleum once more when he ordered that Musa Sahib be buried on the tomb's grounds after dying from cholera in 1828. By 1880, a rumor had begun circulating which alleged that the tomb once was topped by a dome or second storey that was stolen by Ranjit Singh's army, though no evidence has been found to suggest that a dome or second story ever existed at the tomb.

The Shahdara ensemble of monuments suffered further under British rule, when a railway line was built between the tombs of Asif Khan and Nur Jahan. The site was then repaired by the British between 1889 and 1890.

Flooding from the nearby River Ravi threatened or damaged the site in 1867, 1947, 1950, 1954, 1955, 1957, 1958, 1959, 1962, 1966, 1973, 1976, 1988, and 2010. The site sustained water damage during flooding in 1988 that covered much of the site in 10 feet of water for 5 days.

Author Shuja Nawaz wrote that Major General Azam Khan, who served as the General Officer Commanding of 10 Division (Lahore) from 1949 to 1957, "endeared" himself to the local population by deploying the Pakistan Army to aid relief efforts during the 1950 floods and by ordering measures to protect the tomb from encroachment by the Ravi River.

== Architecture ==
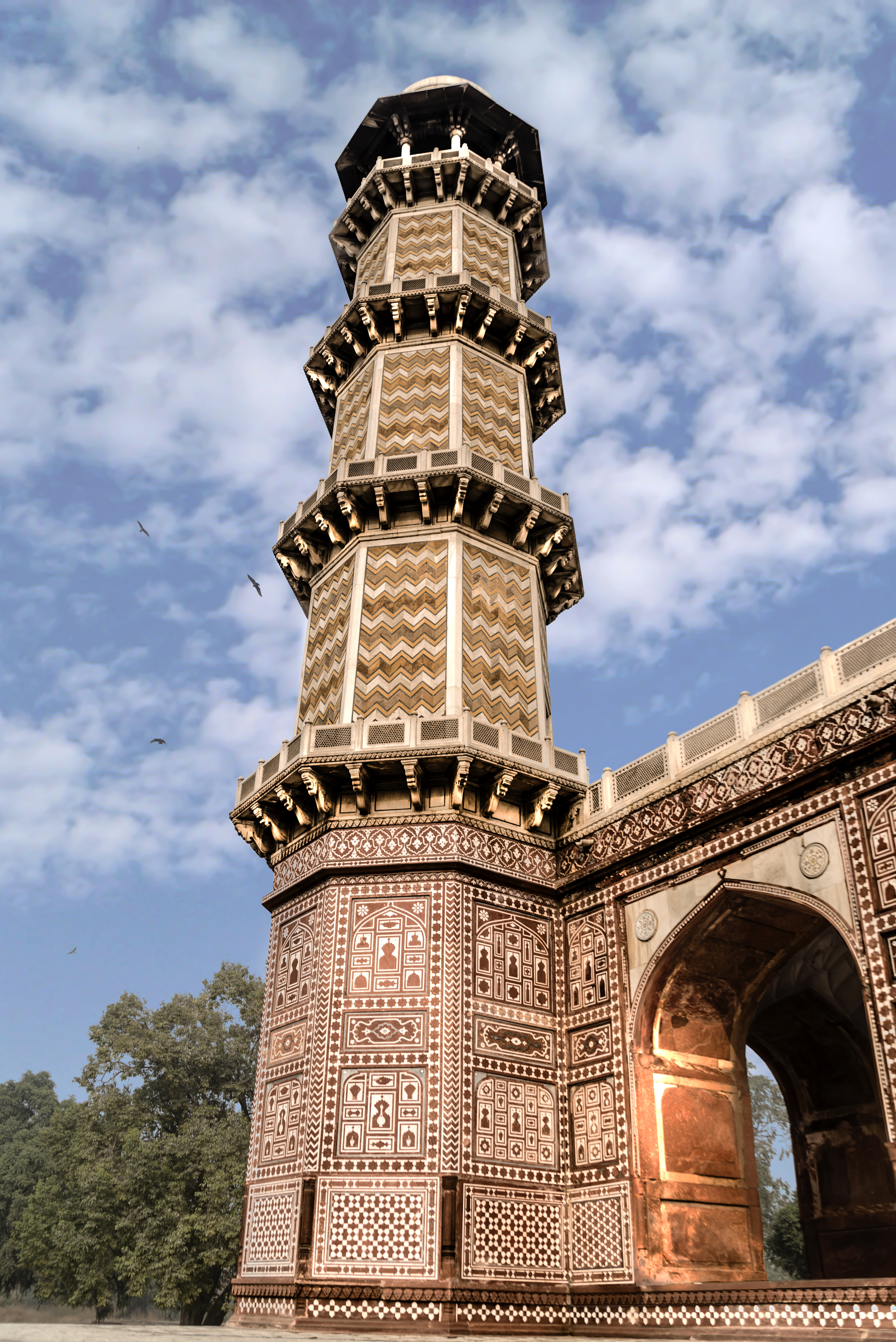
The use of minarets reflects a renewed interest in Timurid architecture during the reign of Jahangir.

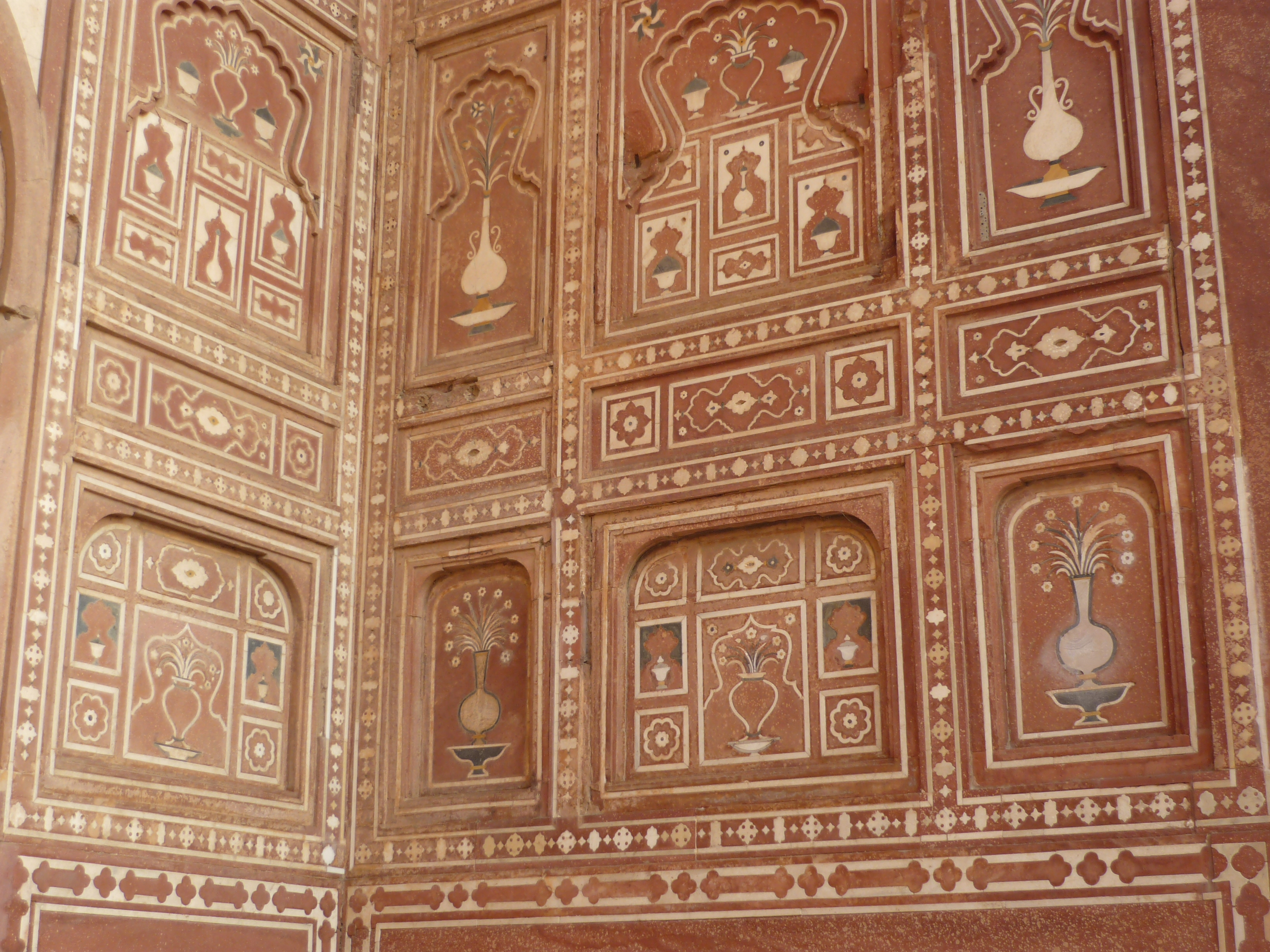
The walls of the tomb are inlaid with carved marble.

The tomb was constructed in a Mughal style influenced by Safavid-style architecture from Persia,. The mausoleum is laid out as a takhtgah - or a mausoleum built upon a podium which serves as a takht, or "throne." For except, there is no takhtgah on the podium, nor seemingly had ever been built.

Similar to the tomb of Akbar, Jahangir's tomb lacks a central dome as the Emperor is reported to have expressly forbade the construction of a dome over his tomb. The use of domes in Mughal funerary architecture was first used at the Tomb of Humayun, and re-established by Shah Jahan.

=== Exterior ===
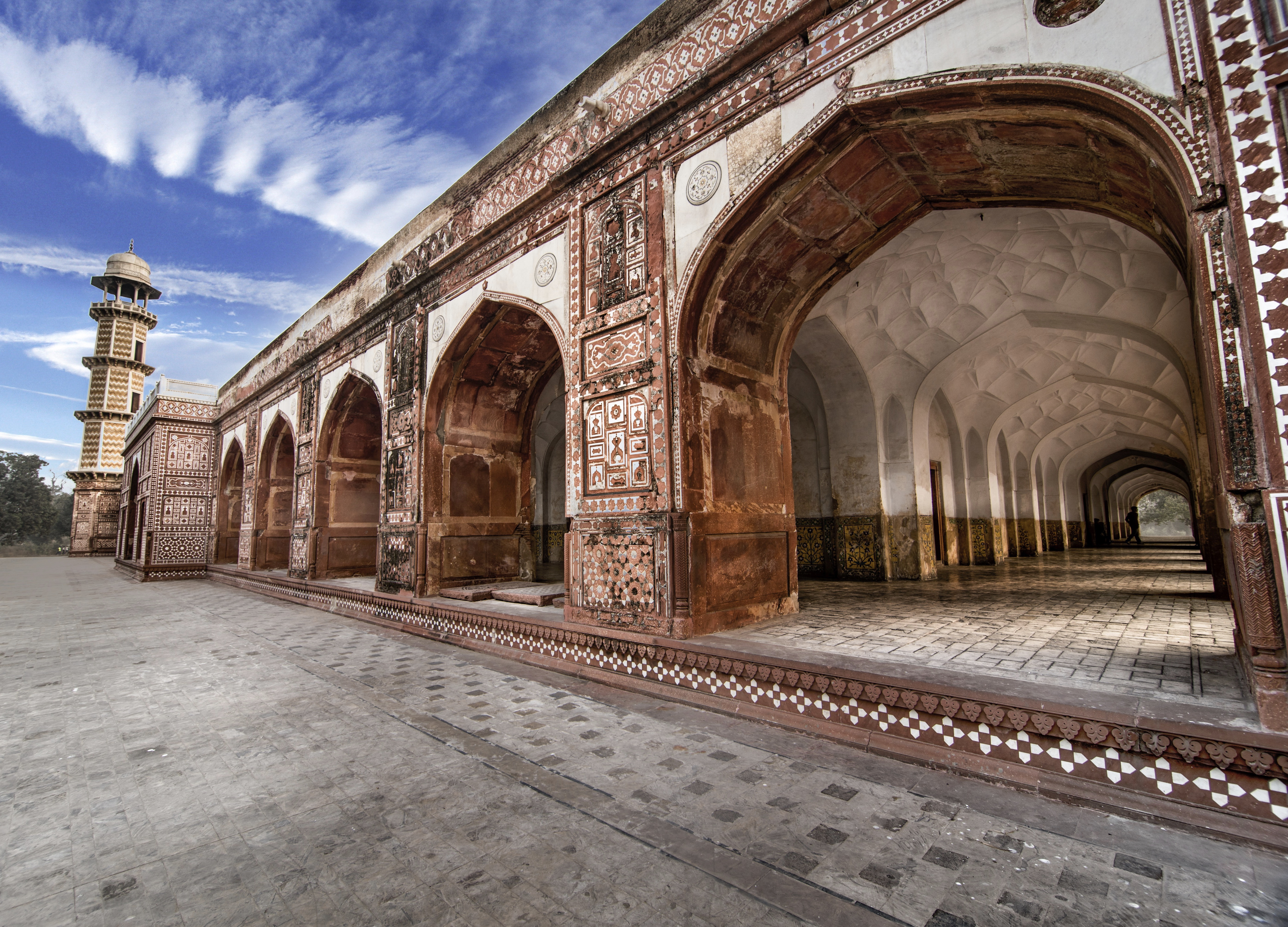
Arcades surround the tomb and feature ghalib kari, or ribs inlaid into arched surfaces on the arch's curved areas

In keeping with Sunni religious tradition, Jahangir's great grandfather Babur chose to be buried in a tomb open to the sky at the Gardens of Babur. Jahangir's tomb broke with this tradition by including a roof. In order to forge a compromise with Sunni tradition, Jahangir expressly forbade the construction of a dome over his tomb, and so the roof is simple and free from architectural embellishments which later featured prominently at the Taj Mahal. The mausoleum's façade is embellished with red sandstone inlaid with marble motifs.

The square-shaped mausoleum is a 22 foot tall, single-story plinth with arcades lining all four sides of the structure. Vaulted bays along the perimeter of the tomb reflect Timurid architectural styles from Central Asia. The mausoleum's façade of red sandstone is inlaid with motifs forged of white marble.

From the building rise four octagonal ornamental minarets projecting from each corner of the building, decorated with geometric inlaid stone. The use of minarets, absent from early Mughal commissions, reflects a renewed interest in Timurid architecture from Central Asia during the reign of Jahangir. The minarets are divided into three sections, with the tomb forming the base, upon which the body of the minaret rests, called by white marble cupolas. The minarets rise to a height of 100 feet (30m).

=== Interior ===
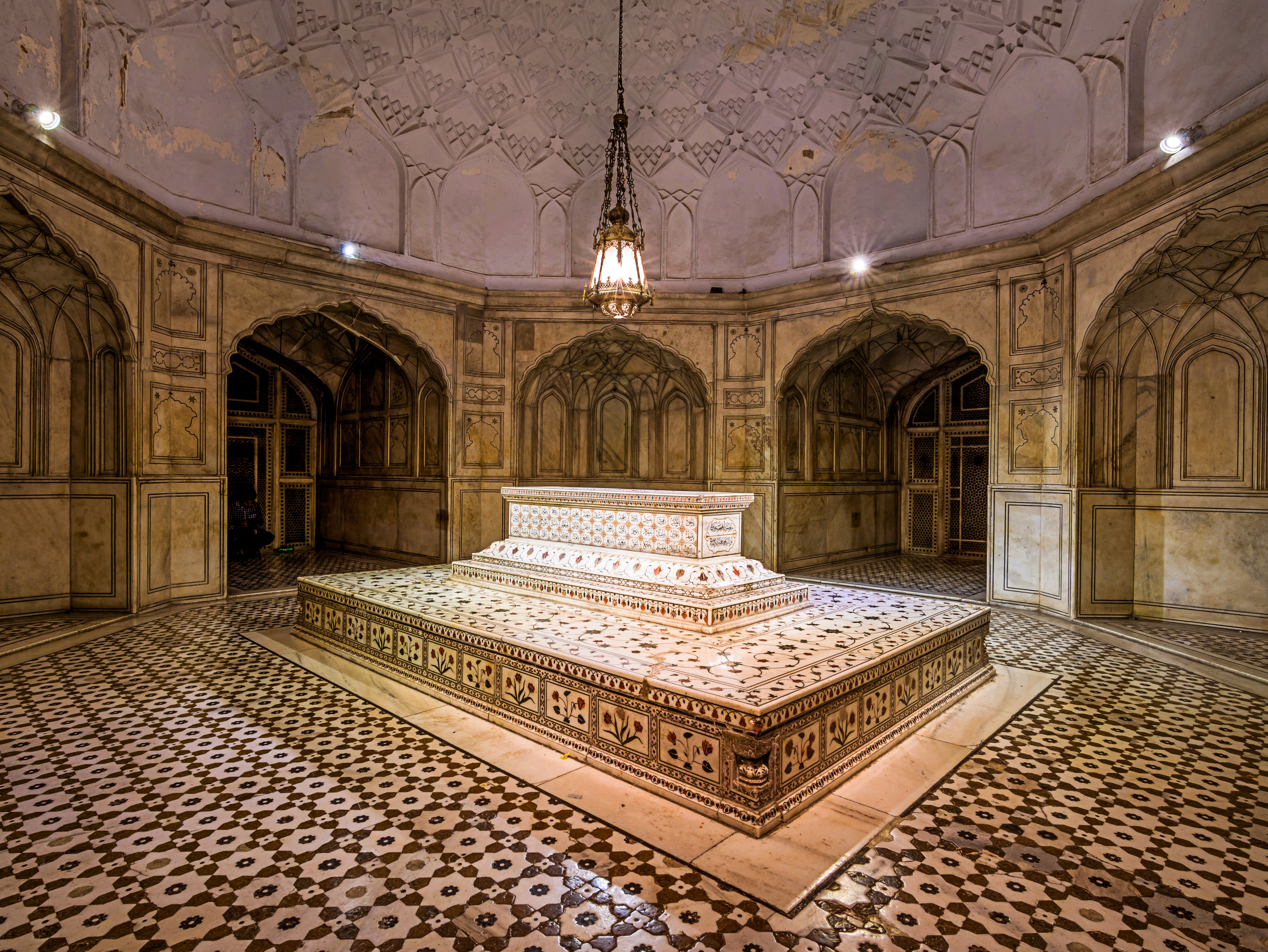
The burial chamber contains the Emperor's cenotaph.

The mausoleum building is divided into a series of vaulted compartments which are richly embellished with Mughal buon fresco. Carved jali screens admit light in various patterns facing toward Mecca.

=== Cenotaph ===
At the centre of the mausoleum is an octagonal chamber lined with carved marble in which the remains of the Mughal Emperor rest in a crypt below a cenotaph. The interior of the tomb features a white-marble cenotaph inlaid with pietra dura in vegetal patterns, as well as the 99 Names of Allah, a common theme in Islamic mysticism.

=== Gardens ===
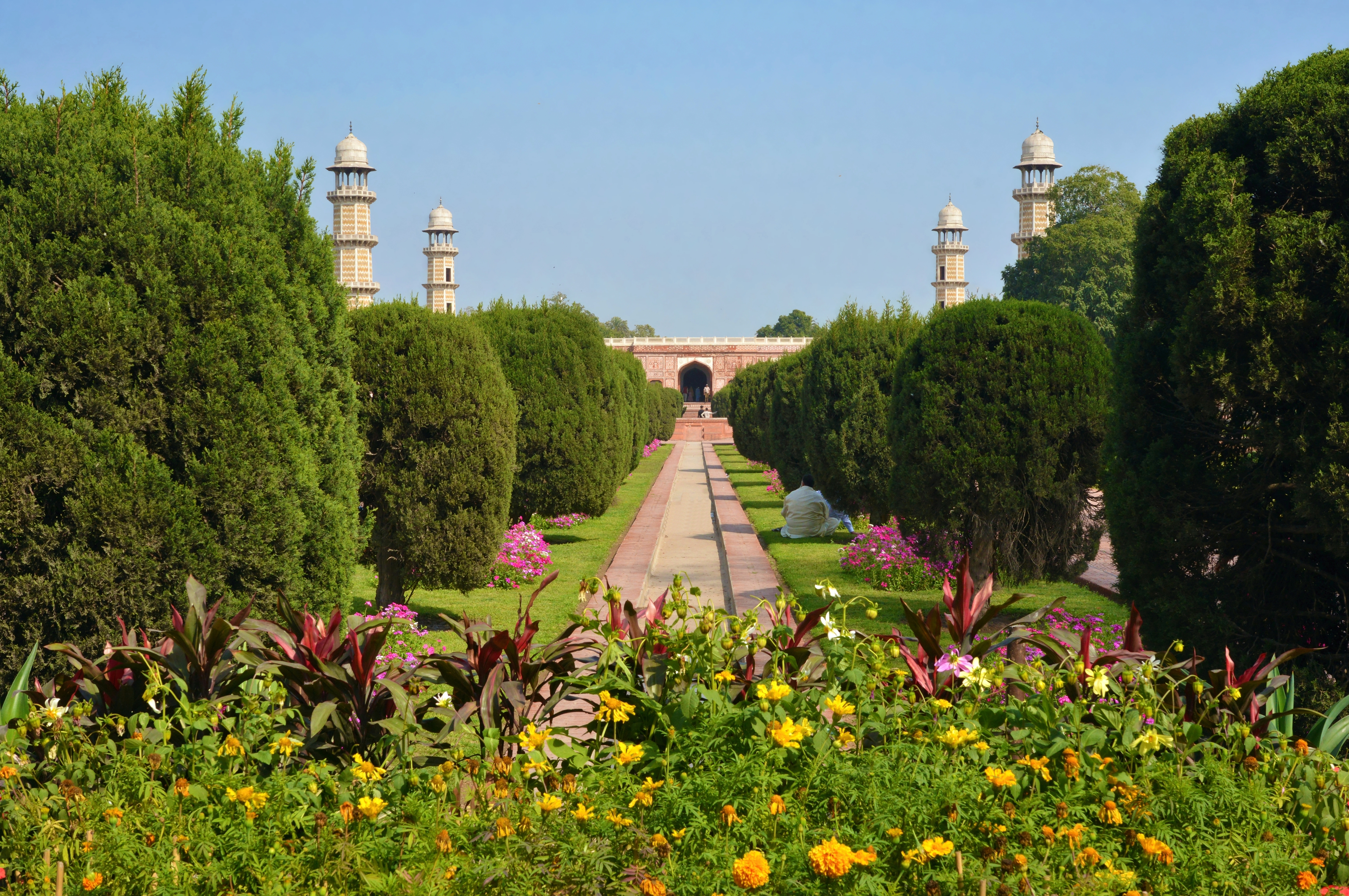
The tomb's gardens are laid out in the Persian Chahar Bagh style.

The gardens surrounding the tomb are vast, and laid out in the Persian Chahar Bagh, or Paradise garden. The garden is separated into four squares by paved walkways (khiyabans) and two bisecting central water channels which are designed to reflect the four rivers that flow in jannat, the Islamic concept of paradise. Each of the four squares is further divided into smaller squares with pathways, creating into 16 squares in all. The garden forms a quadrangle measuring approximately 500 metres on each side.

== Layout ==
The mausoleum is set in a large quadrangle with gates facing each of the cardinal directions. Entry to the quadrangle is via the western edge through the Akbari Sarai – a gate featuring a small mosque. To the immediate west of the Akbari Sarai is the Tomb of Asif Khan – Jahangir's brother-in-law. The tomb was constructed in a Mughal style that was influenced by Safavid architecture from Persia. Nur Jahan, who was of Persian descent, may have introduced this style into the Mughal Court.

== Conservation ==
The site is protected by the Federal Antiquities Act 1975, though stipulations of the law are frequently neglected, resulting in damage to the site and surrounding area. The act forbids construction within 200 feet of the site, though private homes have been built that are located a few metres from the boundary walls of the site. The site was inscribed on the tentative list for UNESCO World Heritage Site status in 1993.

== Numismatics and philately ==
The tomb was featured on the 1000 Rupee note until 2005. Pakistan issued a postage stamp in 1954 to commemorate Emperor Jahangir mausoleum.

== Gallery ==
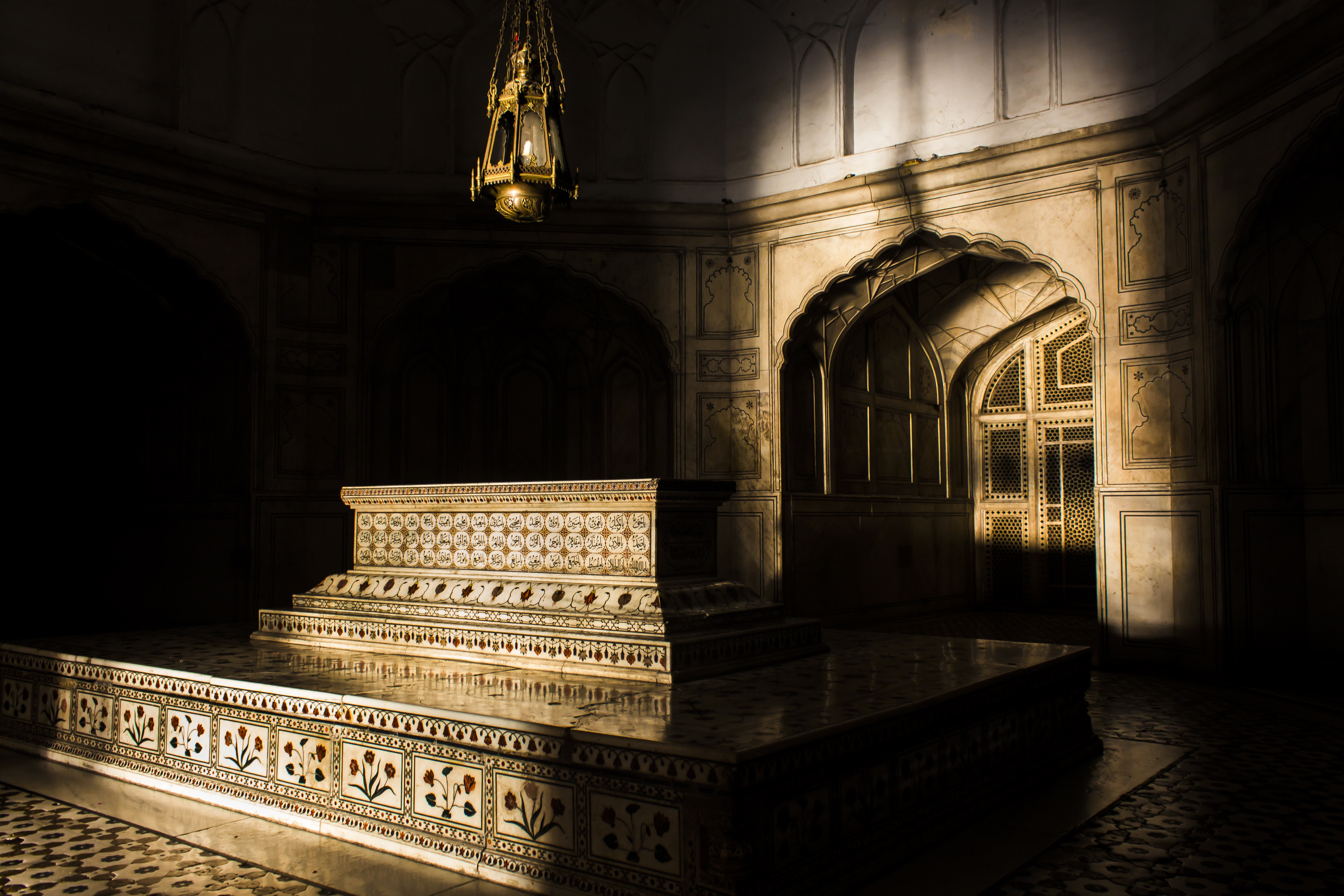
The Emperor's cenotaph is located in a solemn inner chamber.

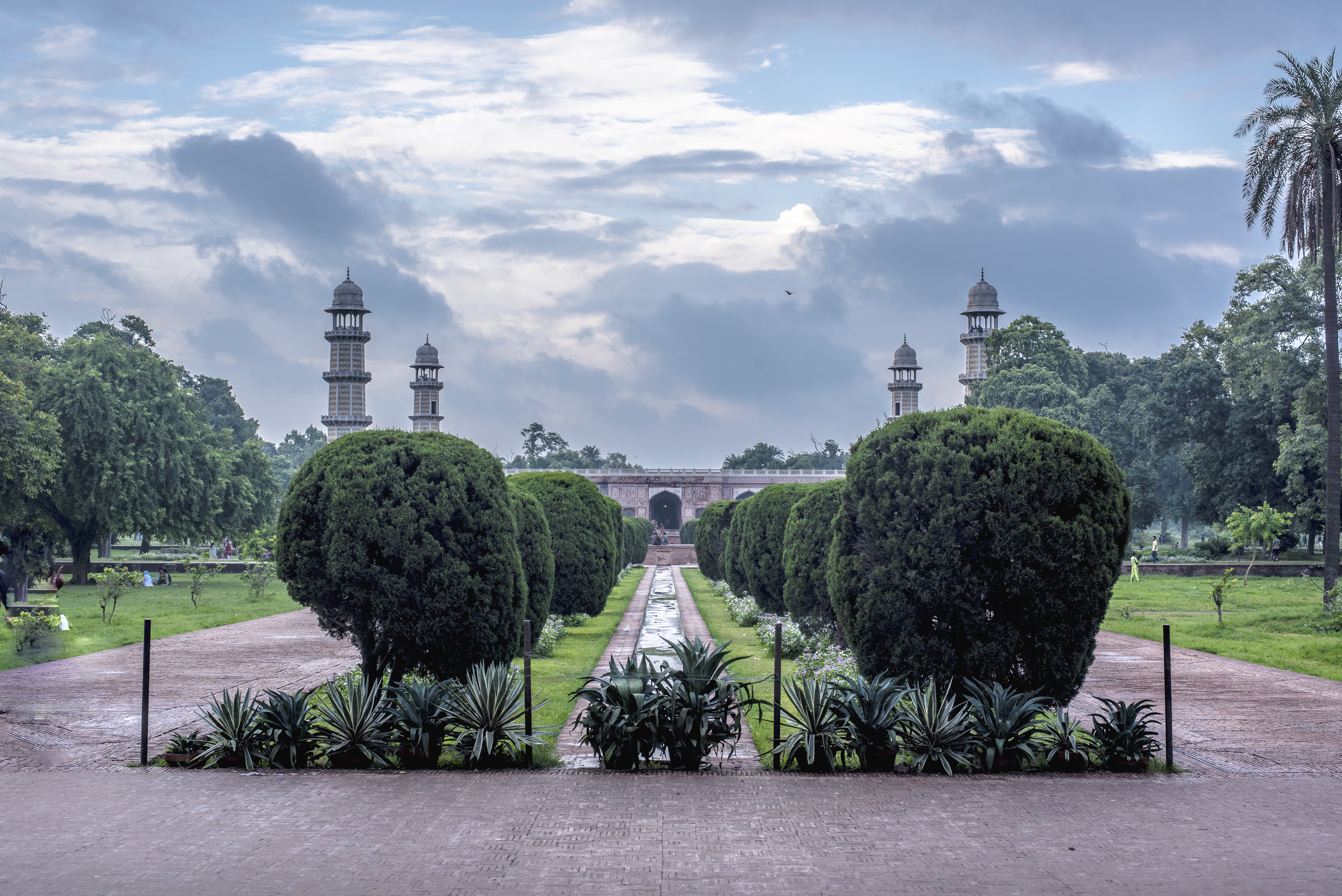
The tomb is surrounded by a Persian-style Paradise garden.

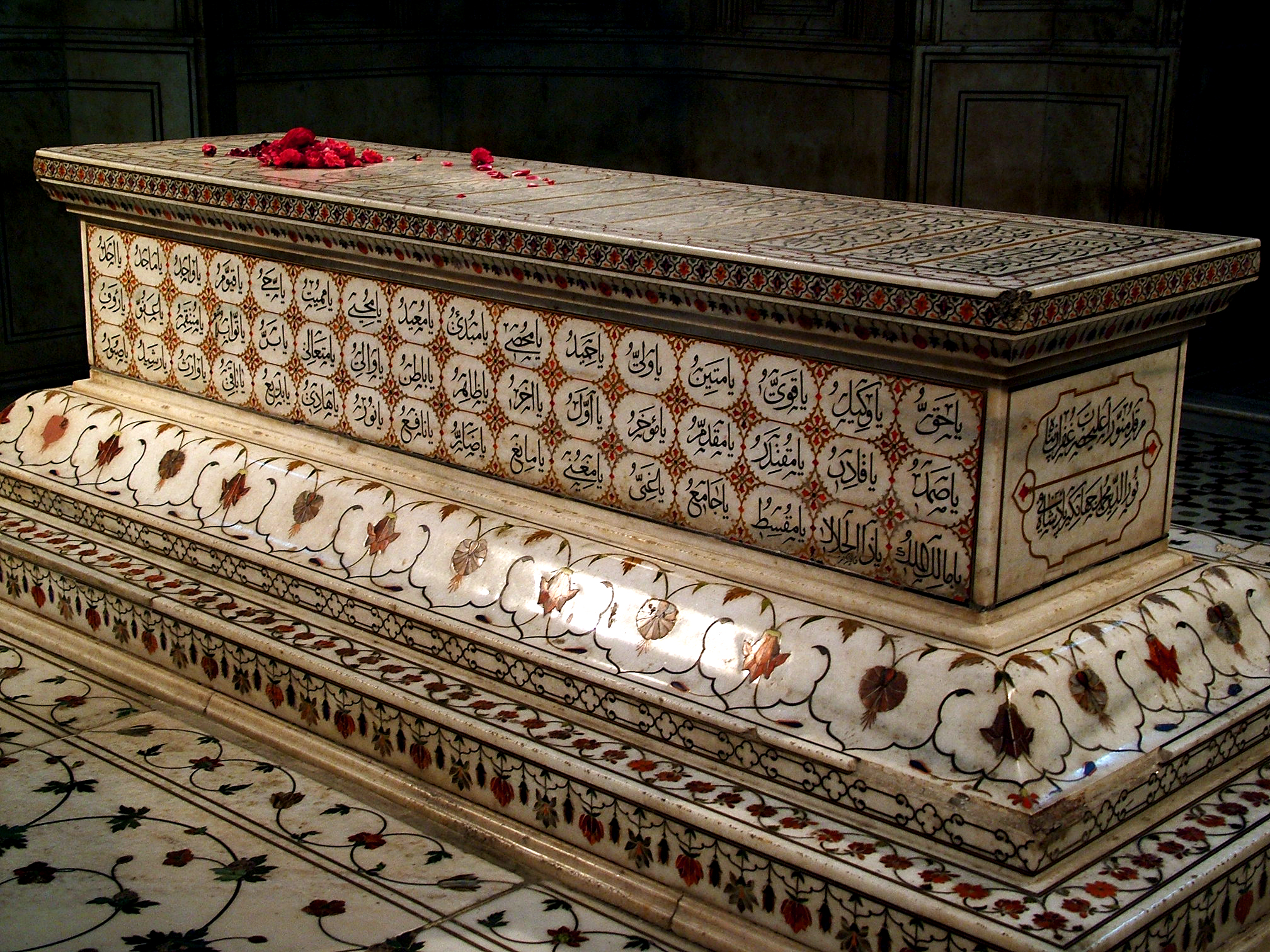
Jehangir's cenotaph is richly embellished with intricate inlay.

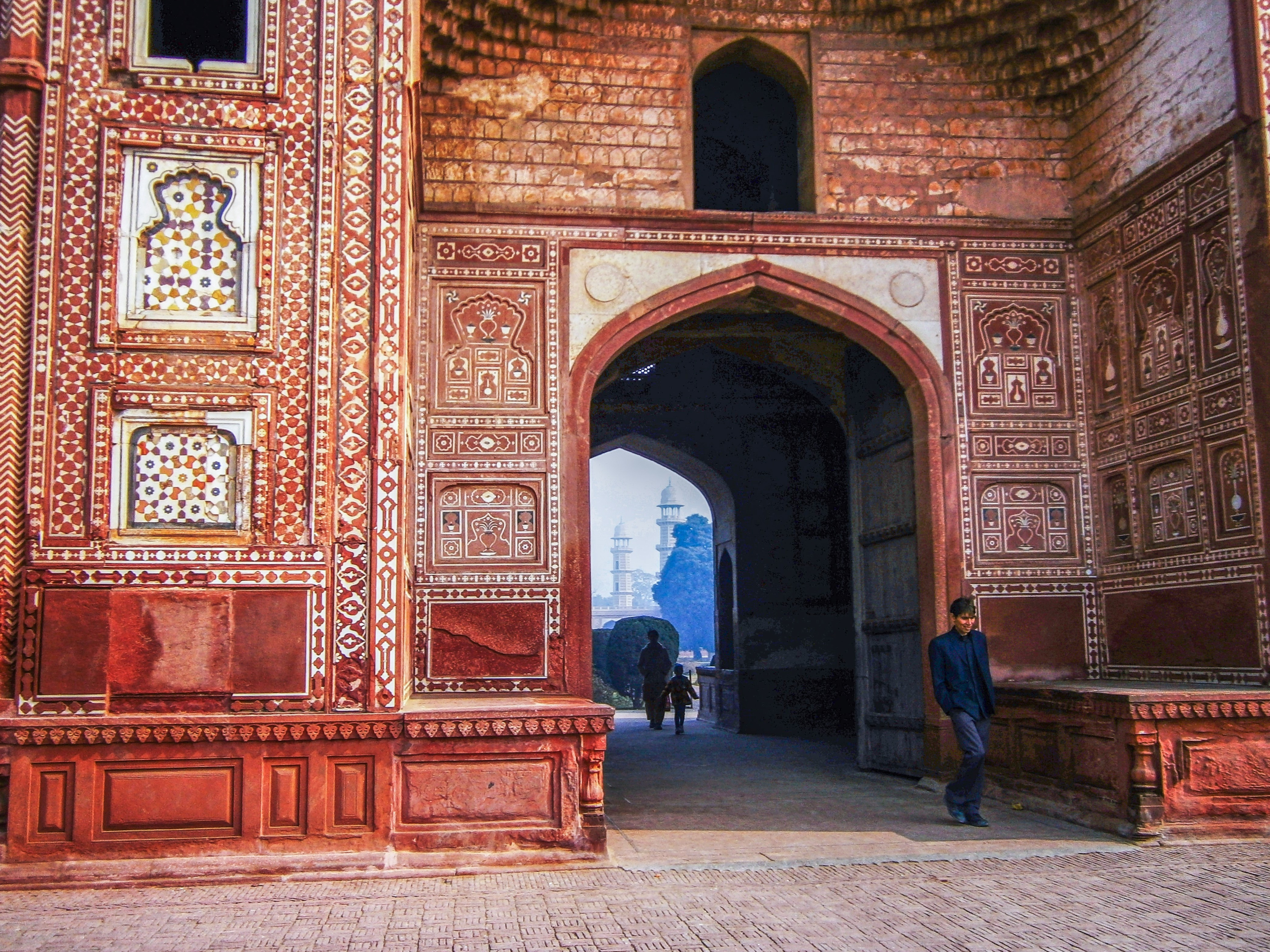
Entry to the mausoleum is through the Akbari sarai.

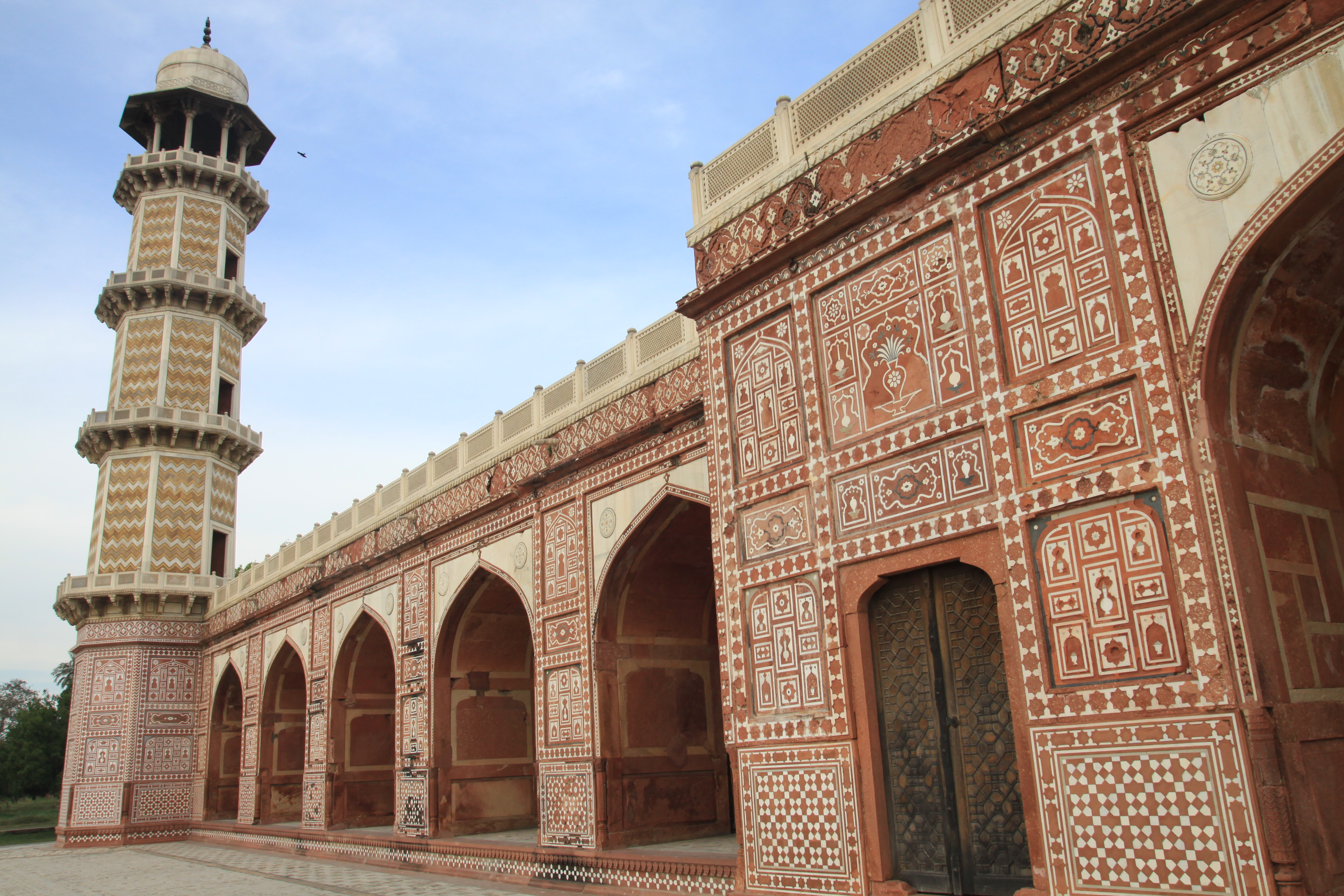
A view of the mausoleum's exterior embellishments and architectural features.

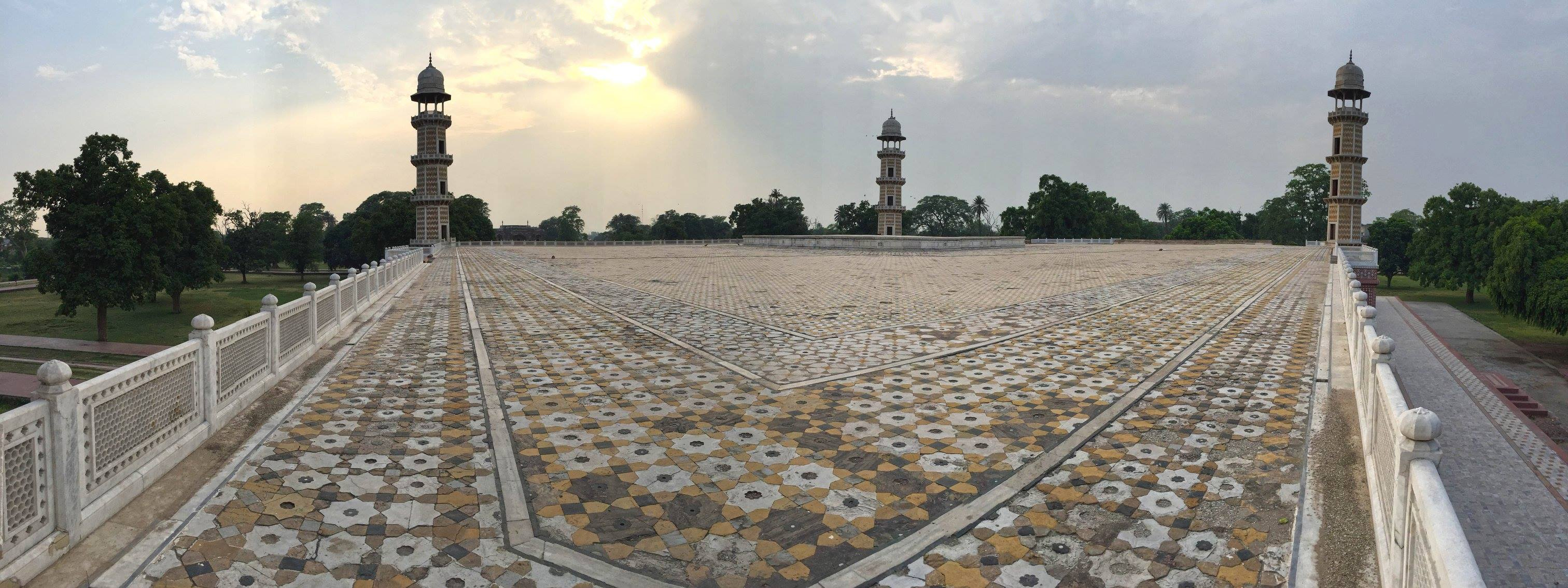
Even the mausoleum's roof is decorated with mosaic tile-work.

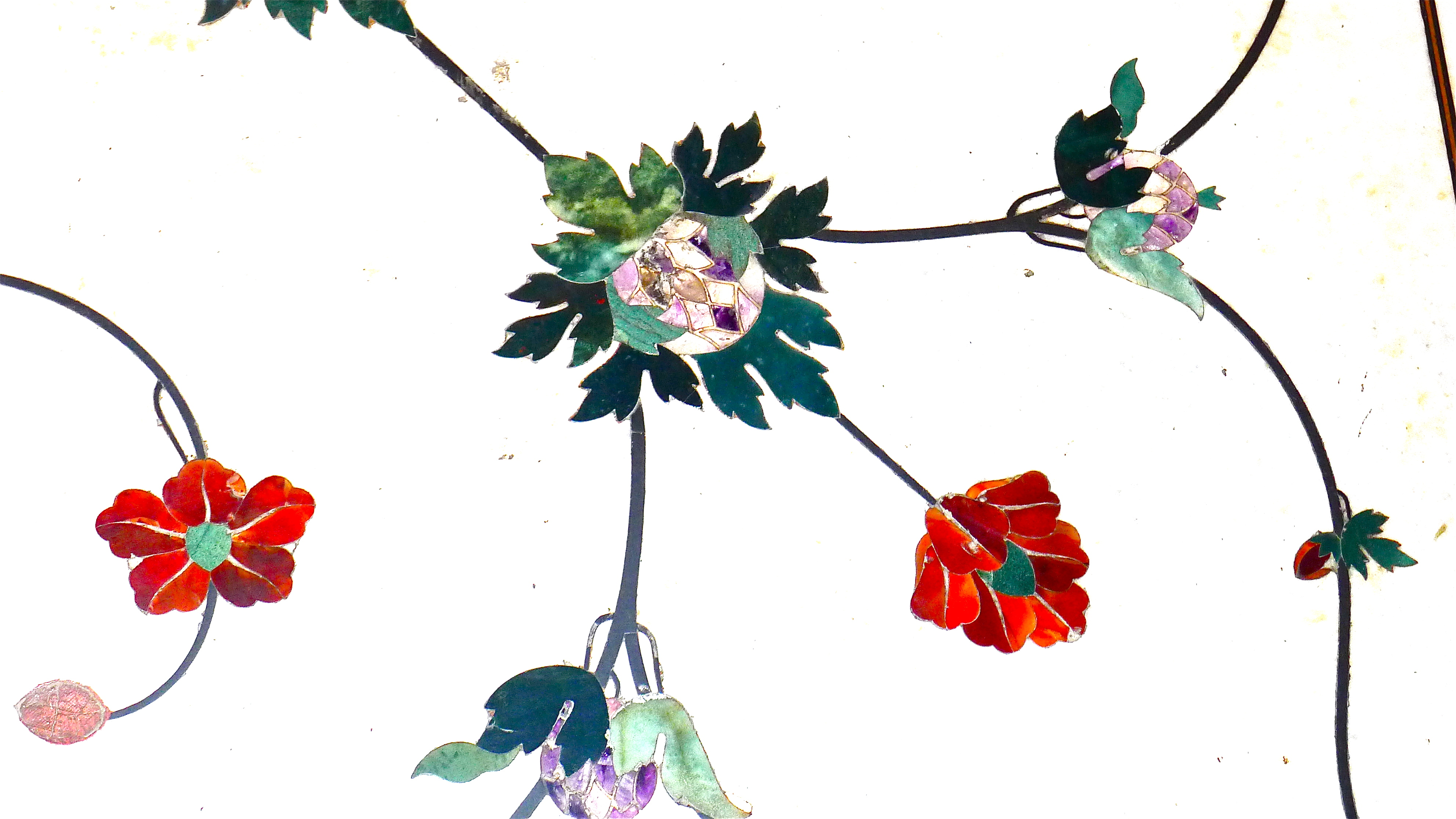
Close up view of the intricately inlaid marble on Jehangir's cenotaph

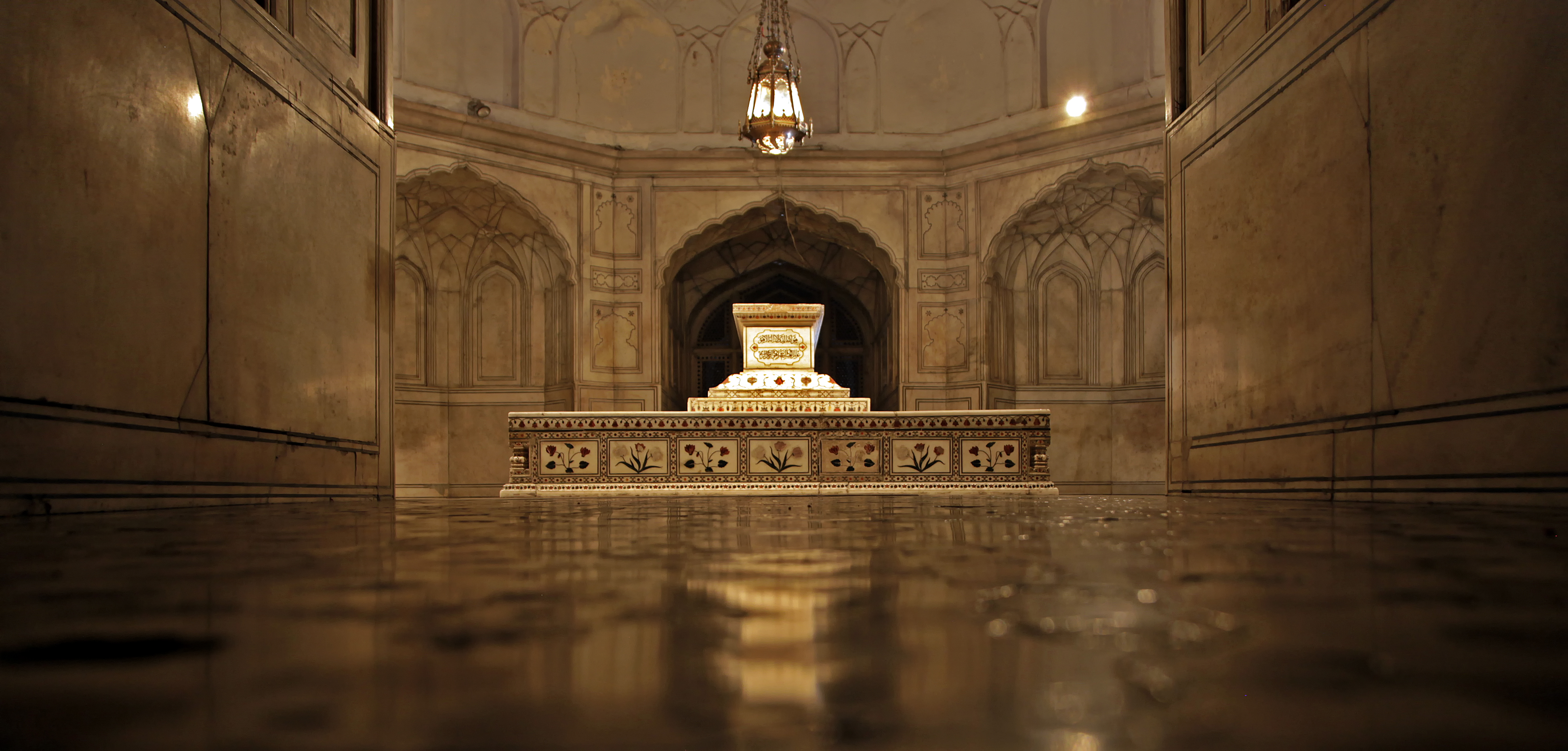
The cenotaph of the Emperor is located in the centre of the mausoleum.

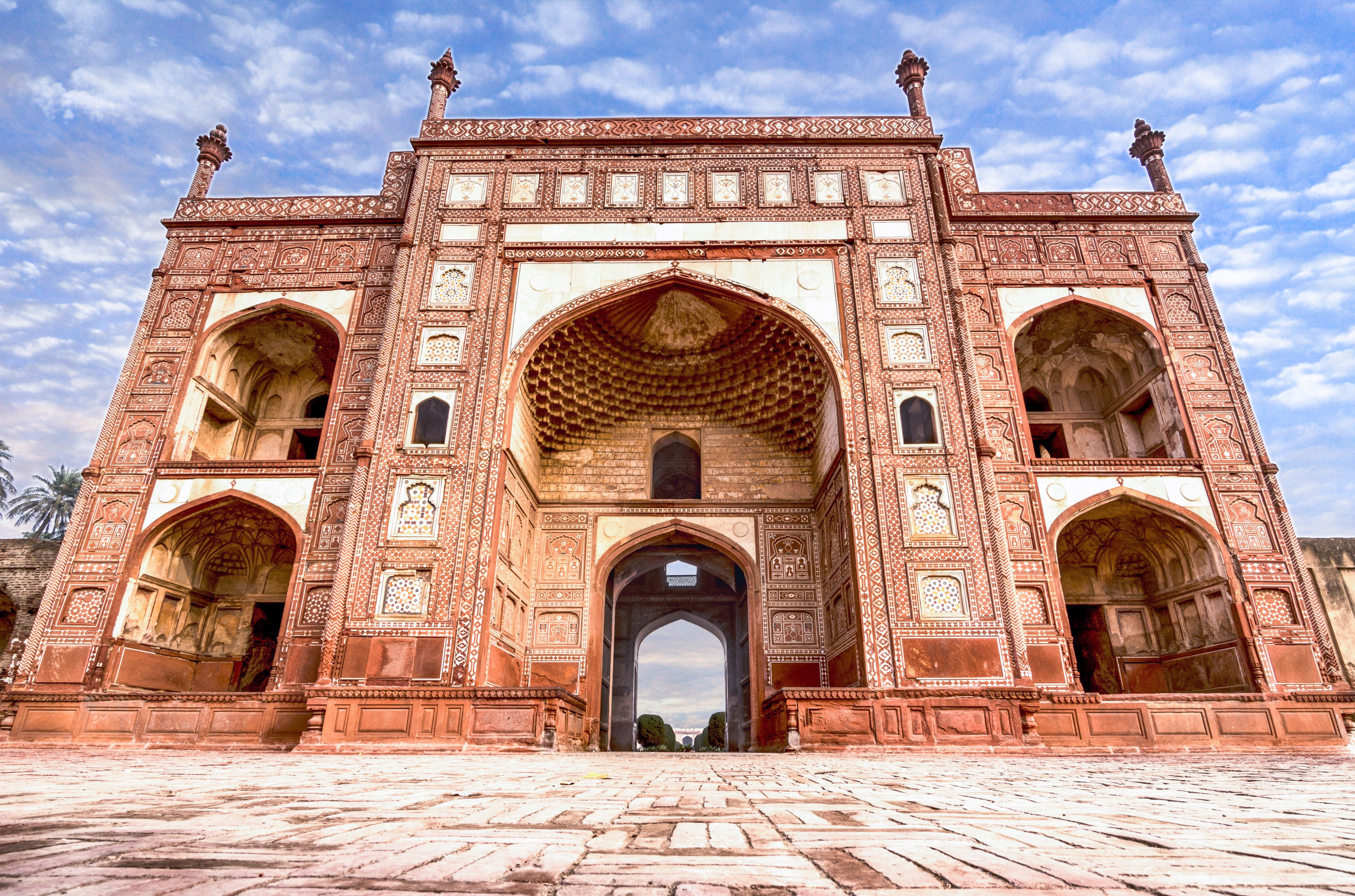
The outer perimeter of the complex features a large entry gate known as Bara Darwaza that leads to the Akbari Sarai.

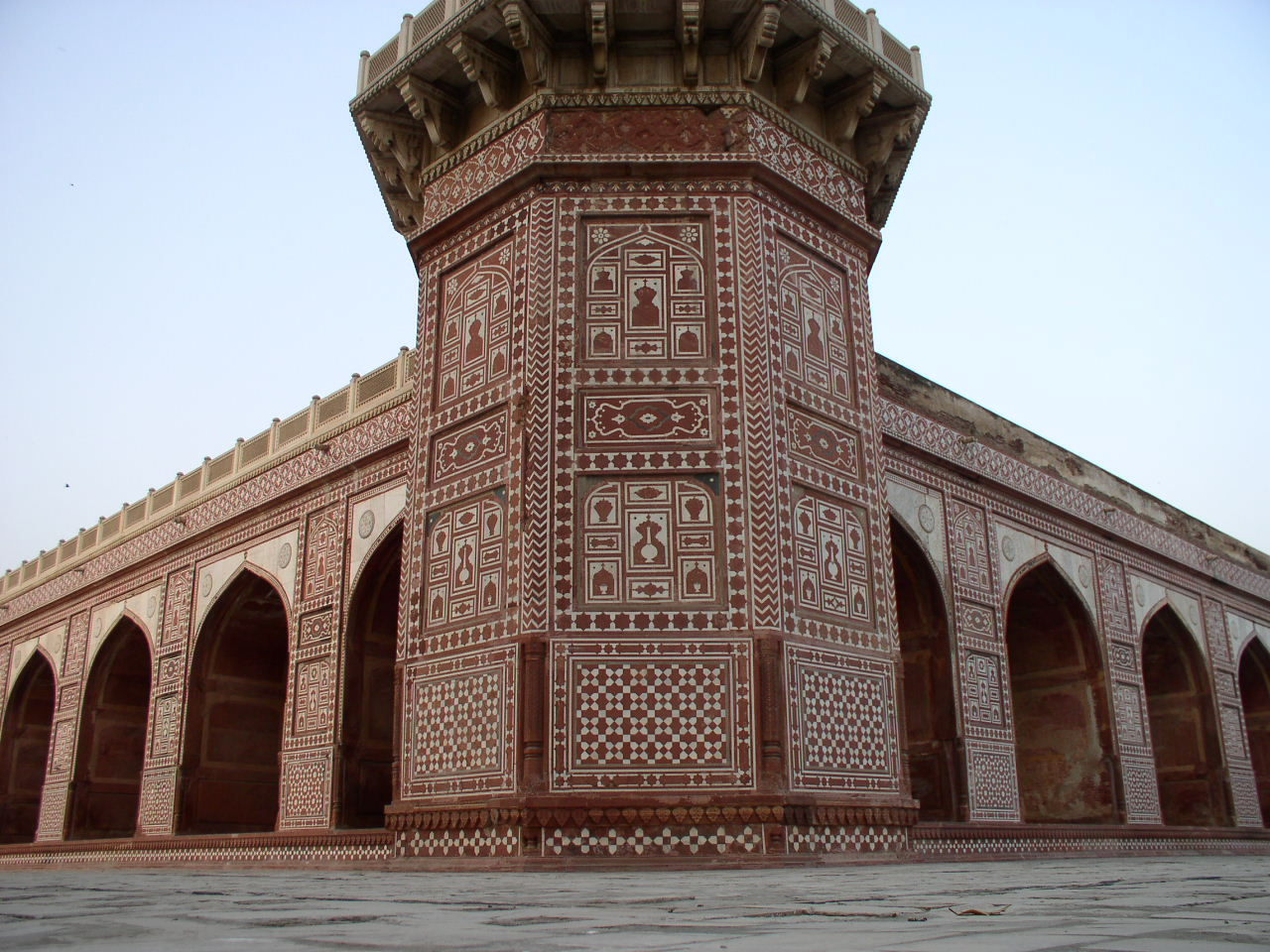
Bases of the minarets feature fine pietra dura detail.

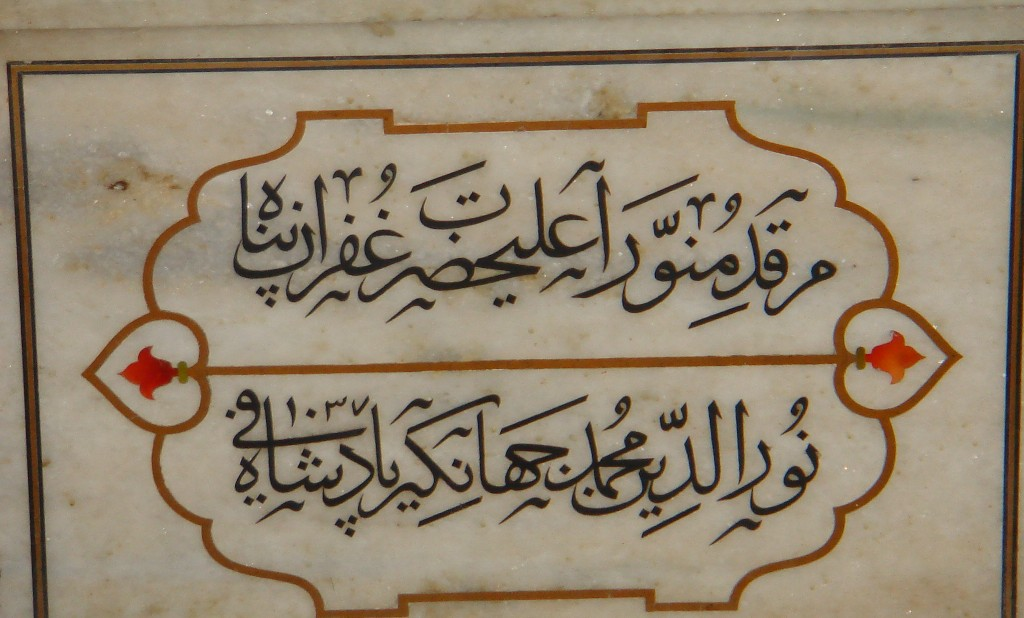
"Illumined Grave of His Majesty, Asylum of Pardon: Emperor Nur-ud-din Muhammad Jahangir, 1037 AH"

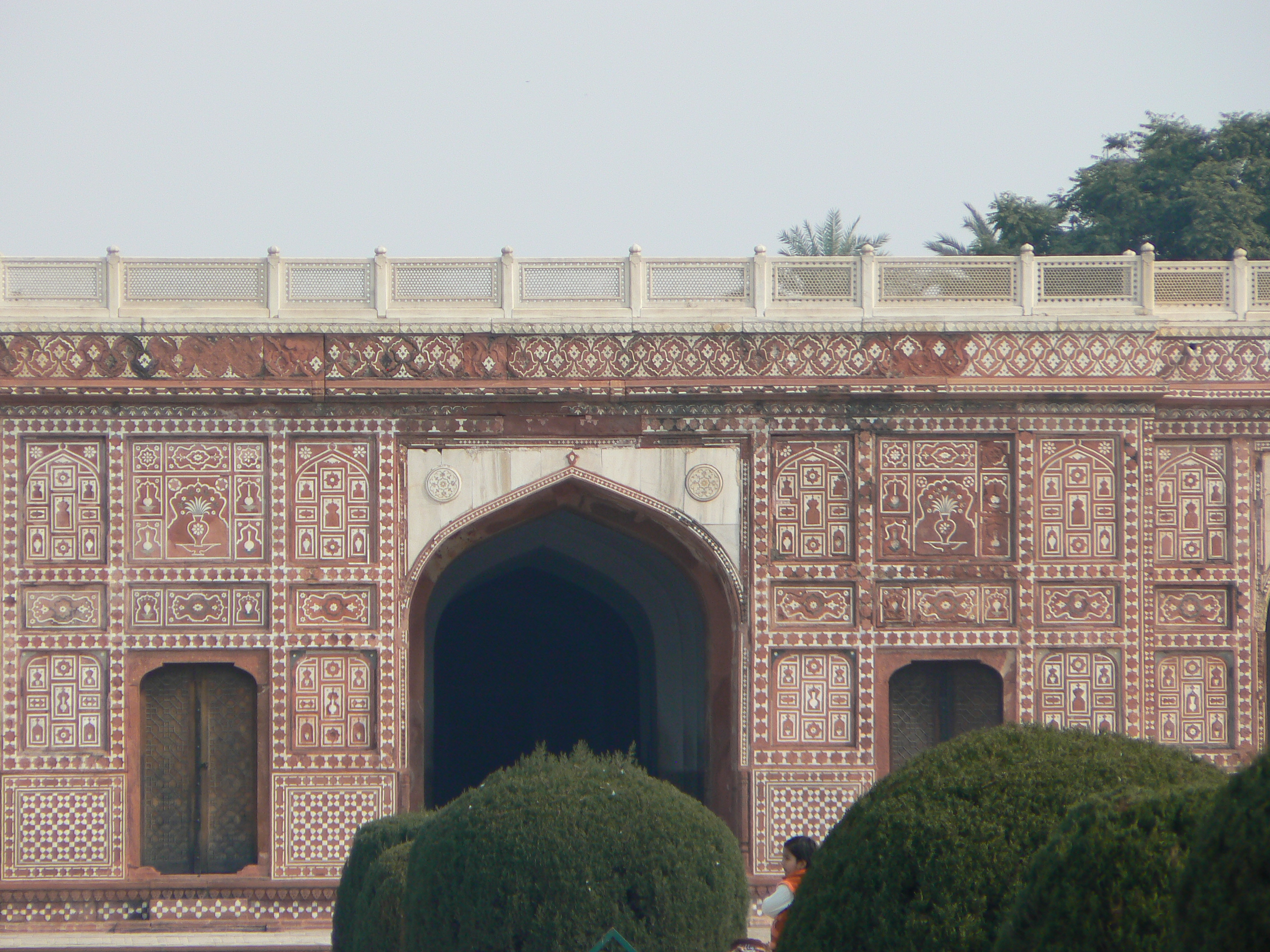
Walls surrounding the tomb

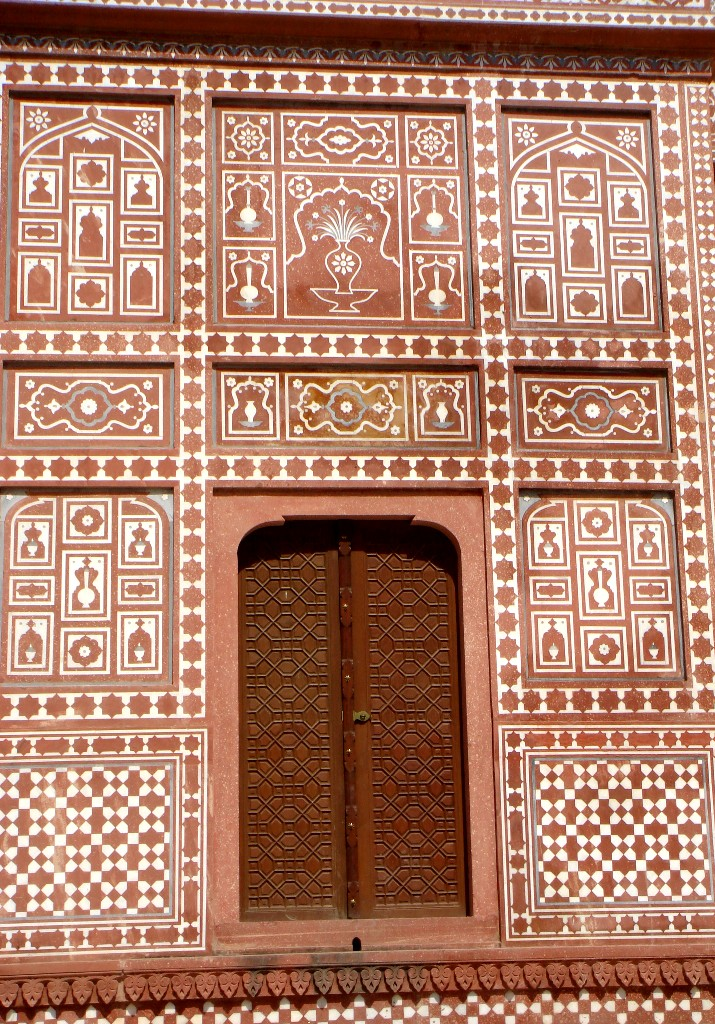
Pietra dura detail

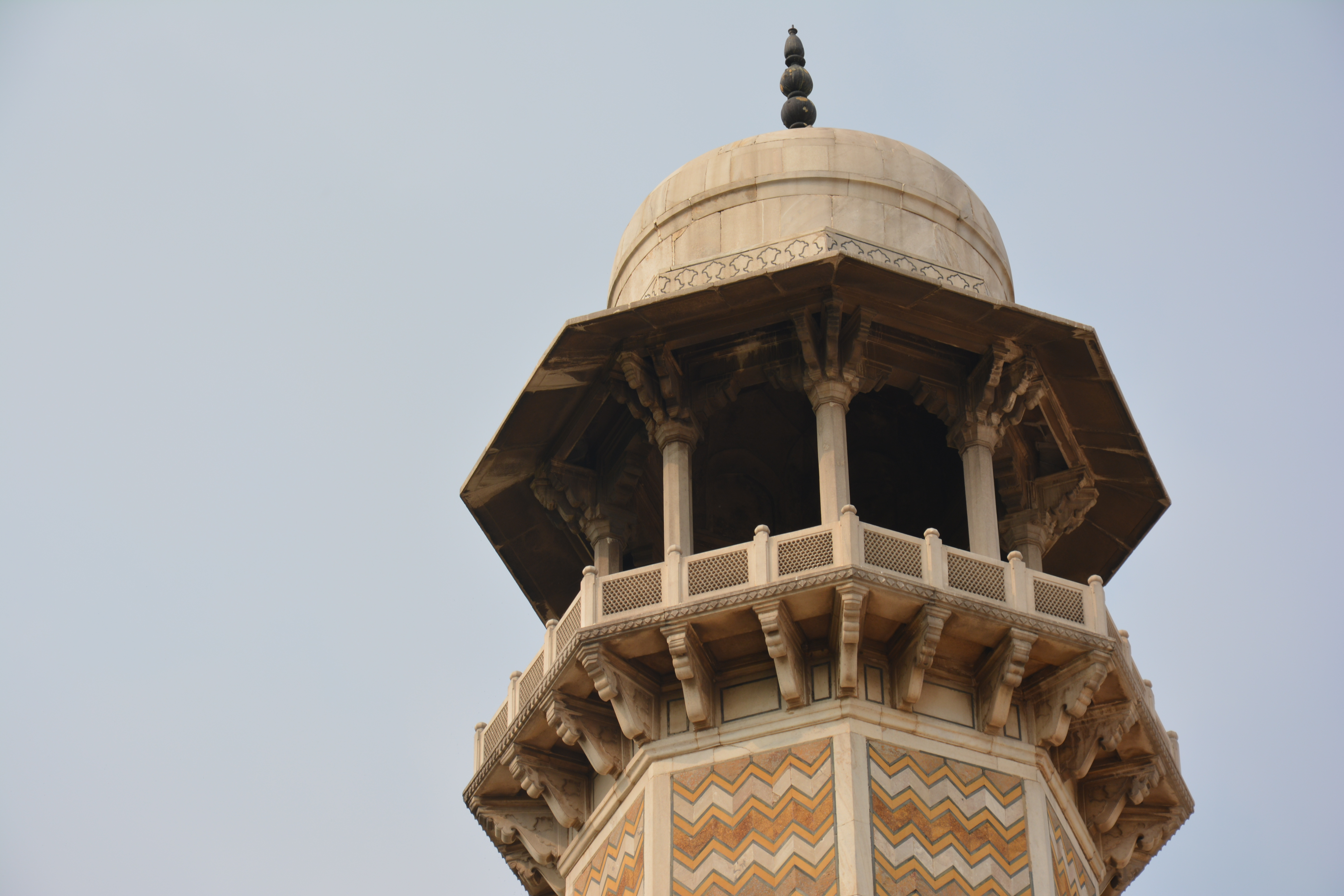
The minarets at the tomb are capped by white marble cupolas

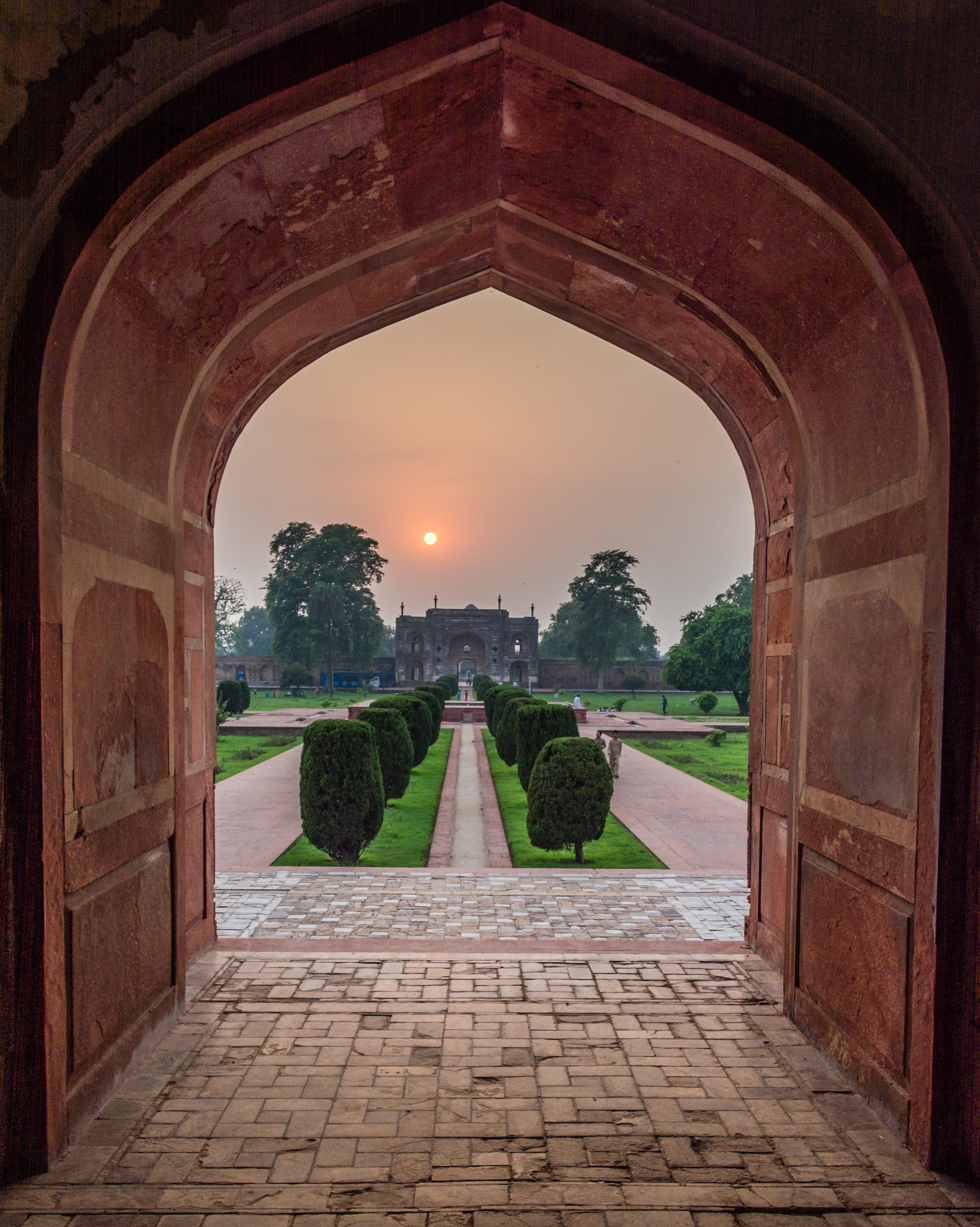

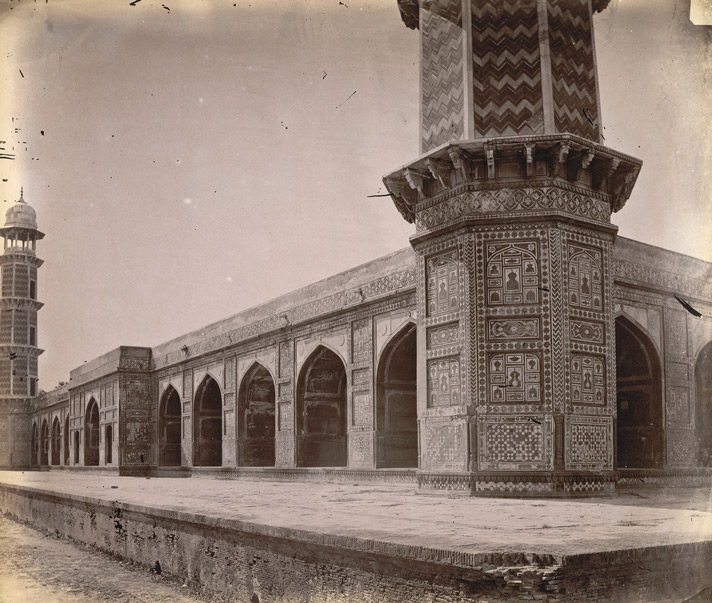
Façade of Jahangir's Tomb in 1880.

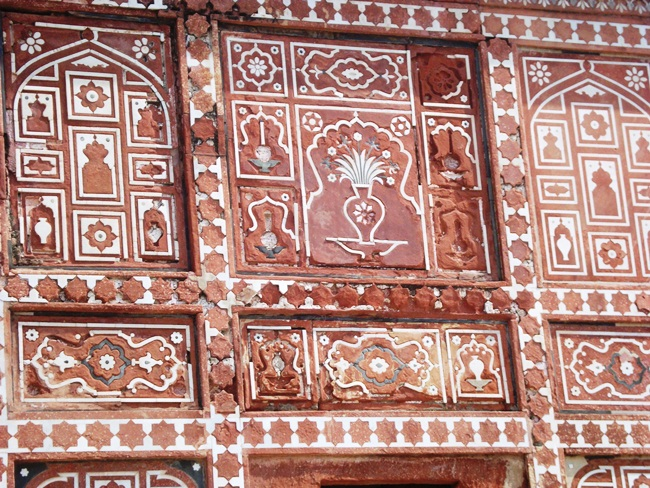
Close-up of pietra dura detail.

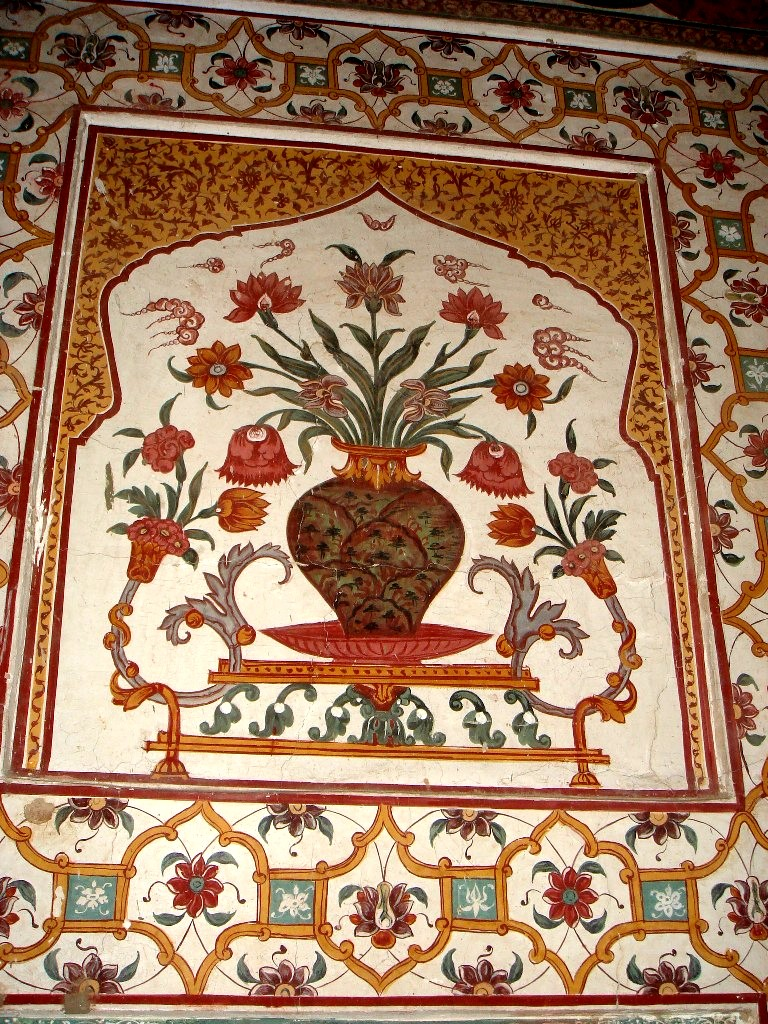
Fresco in vestibule of tomb chamber

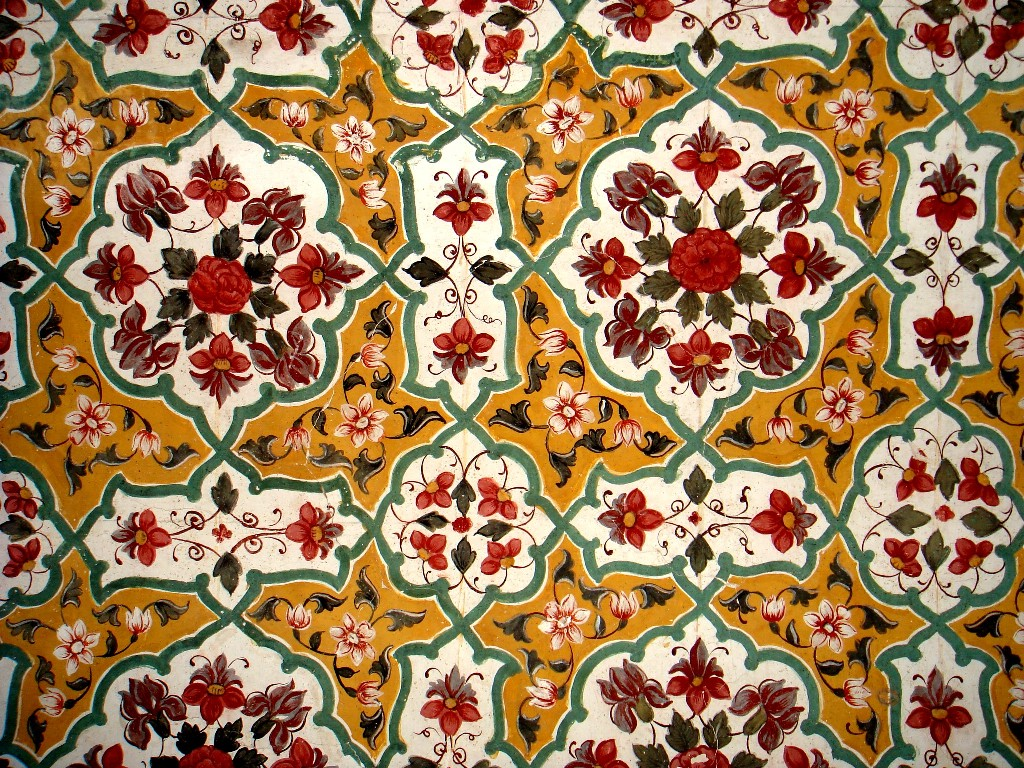
Fresco in vestibule of tomb chamber

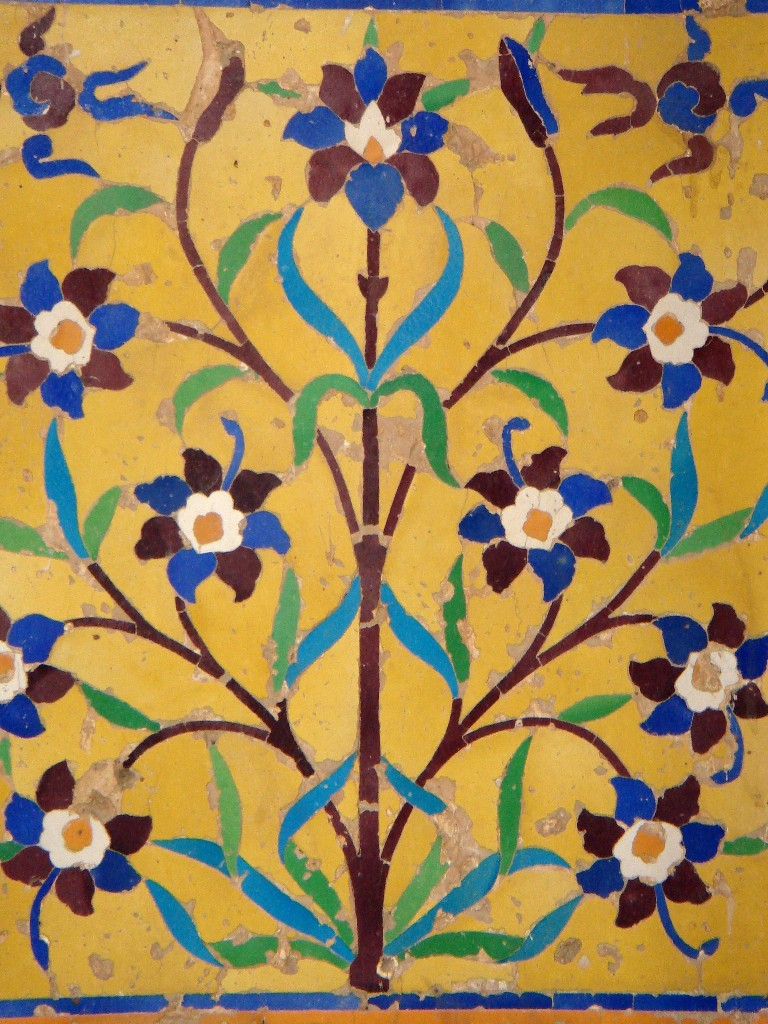
Glazed tile kashi inlay in mausoleum verandah

== See also ==
- Humayun's Tomb in Delhi
- Tomb of Akbar the Great in Agra
