= Shahdara Bagh =

Locality in Lahore, Pakistan

Coordinates: 31.6297°N 74.2833°E

Shahdara Bagh شاہدره باغ
- Suburb
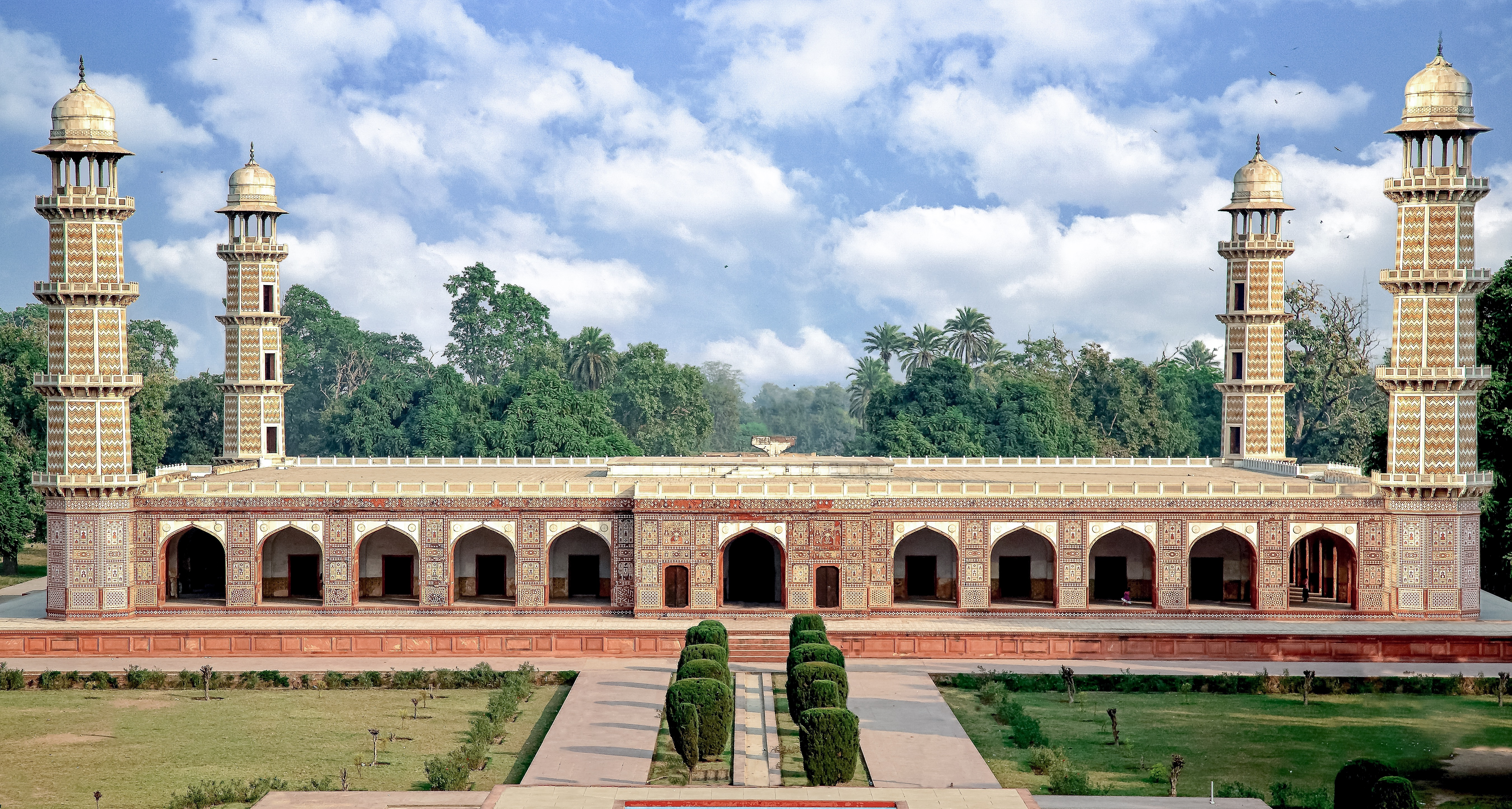
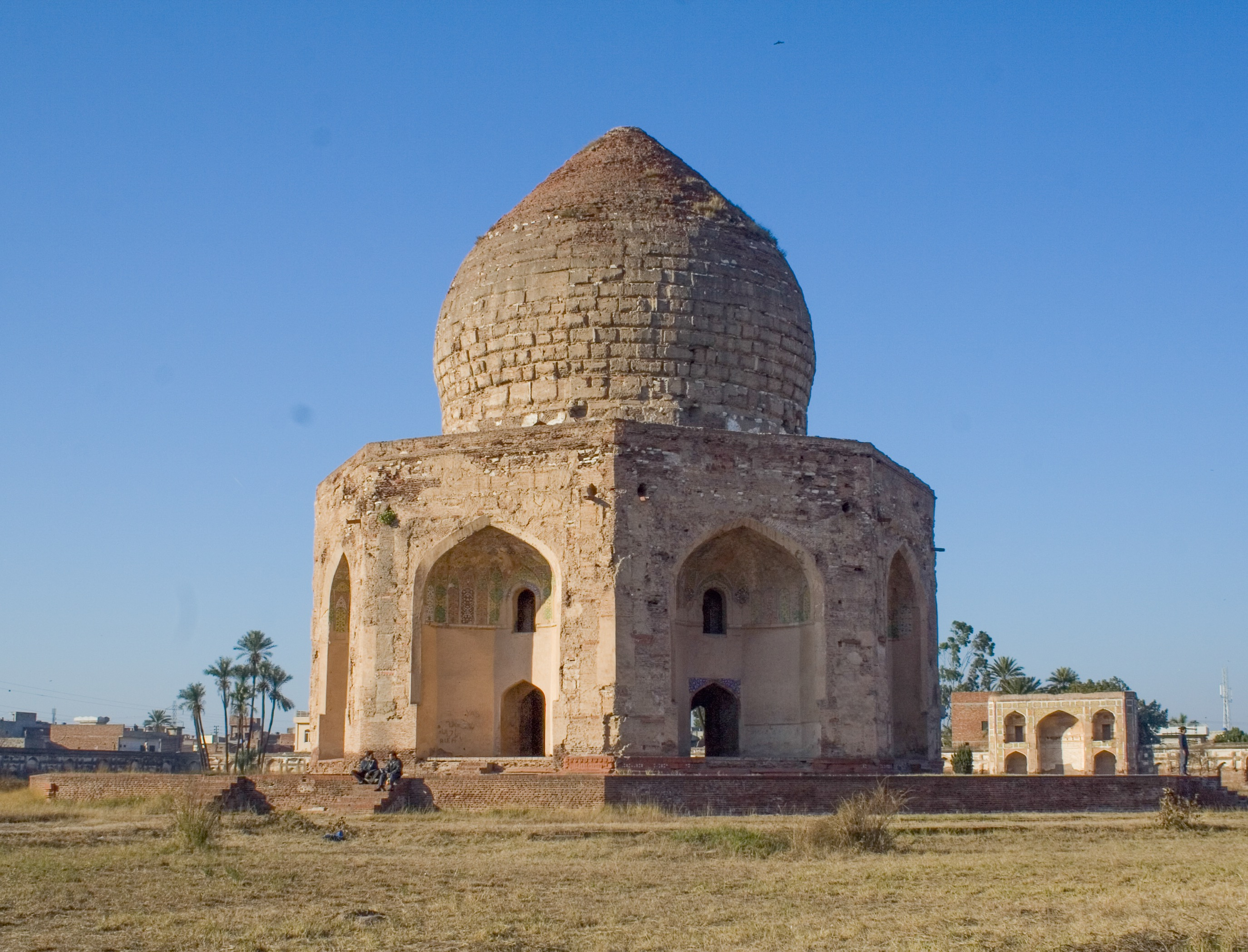
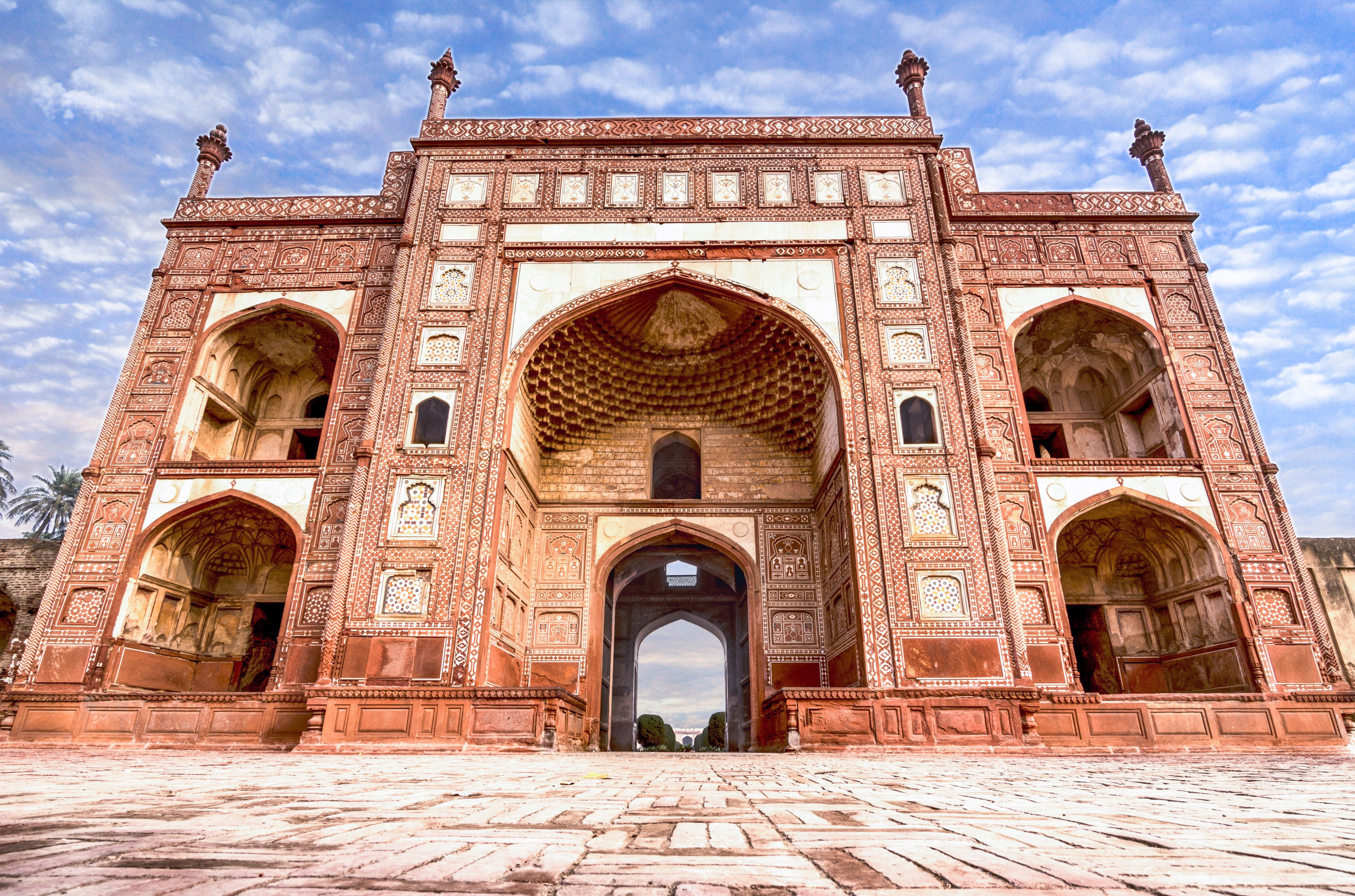
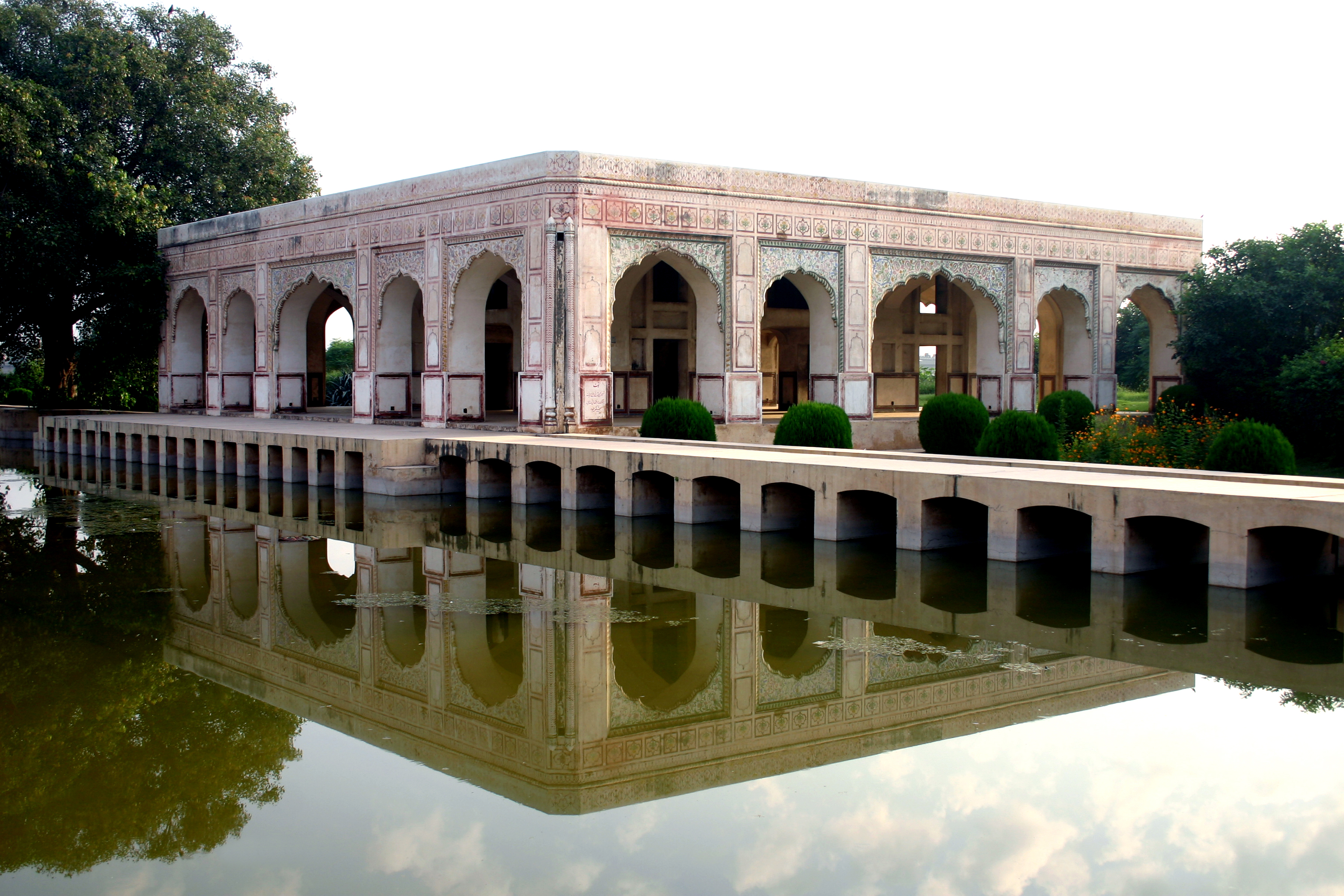
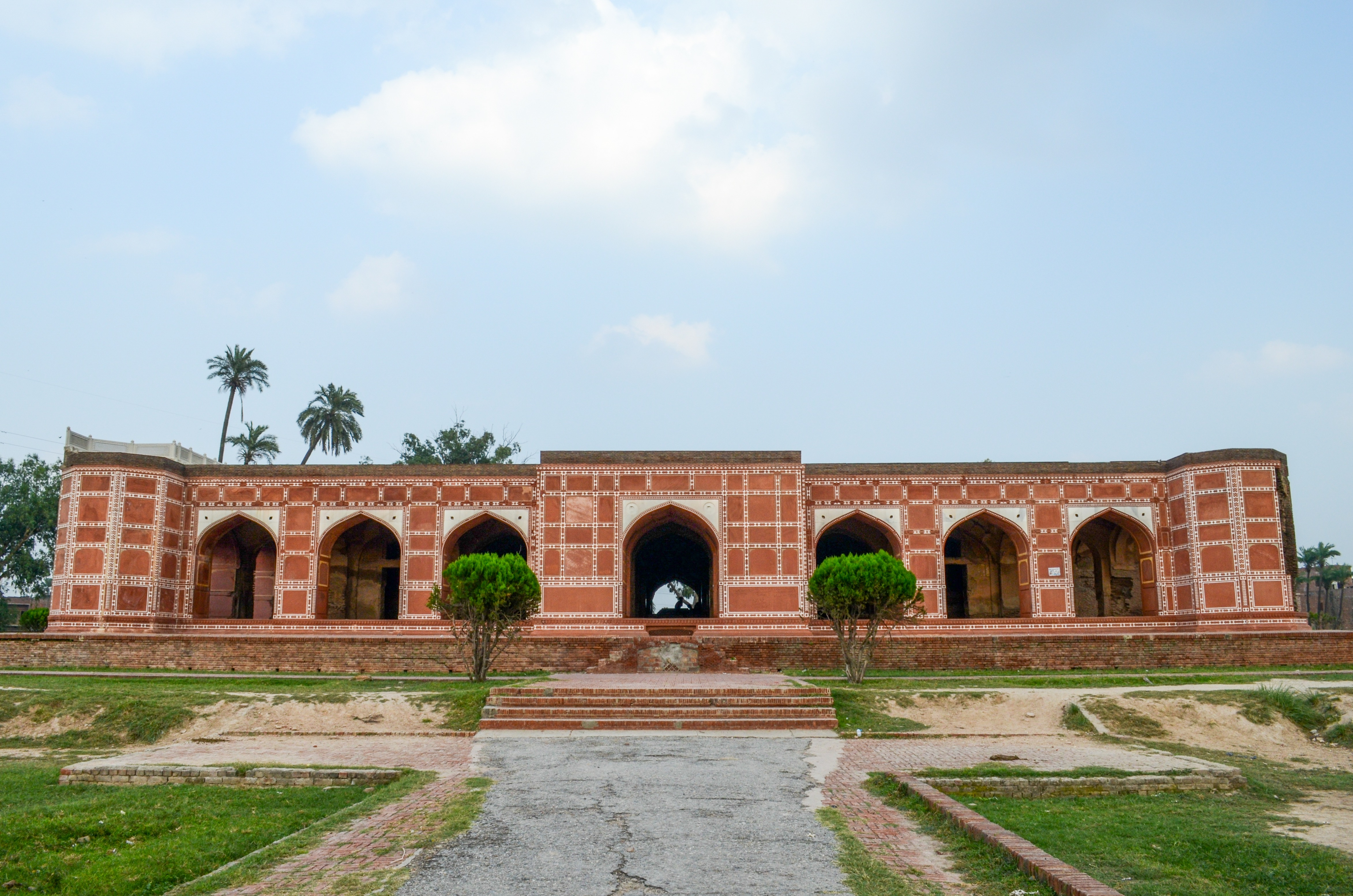
- Tomb of Jahangir Tomb of Asif Khan Akbari Sarai Baradari of Kamran Mirza Tomb of Nur Jahan
- Nickname: Shahdara
- Interactive map of Shahdara Bagh
- Country: Pakistan
- Province: Punjab
- City: Lahore
- Administrative town: Ravi

Shahdara Bagh (Punjabi: شاہدرہ باغ, romanized: Śāhdrā Bāġ; Urdu: شاہدره باغ; lit. 'King's Passage's Garden') is a historic precinct located along the western bank of the Ravi River, across from the Walled City of Lahore, in Lahore, Punjab, Pakistan. It is the site of several Mughal-era monuments, including the Tomb of Jahangir, the Akbari Sarai, Tomb of Asif Khan, Tomb of Nur Jahan and Baradari of Kamran Mirza.

== History ==
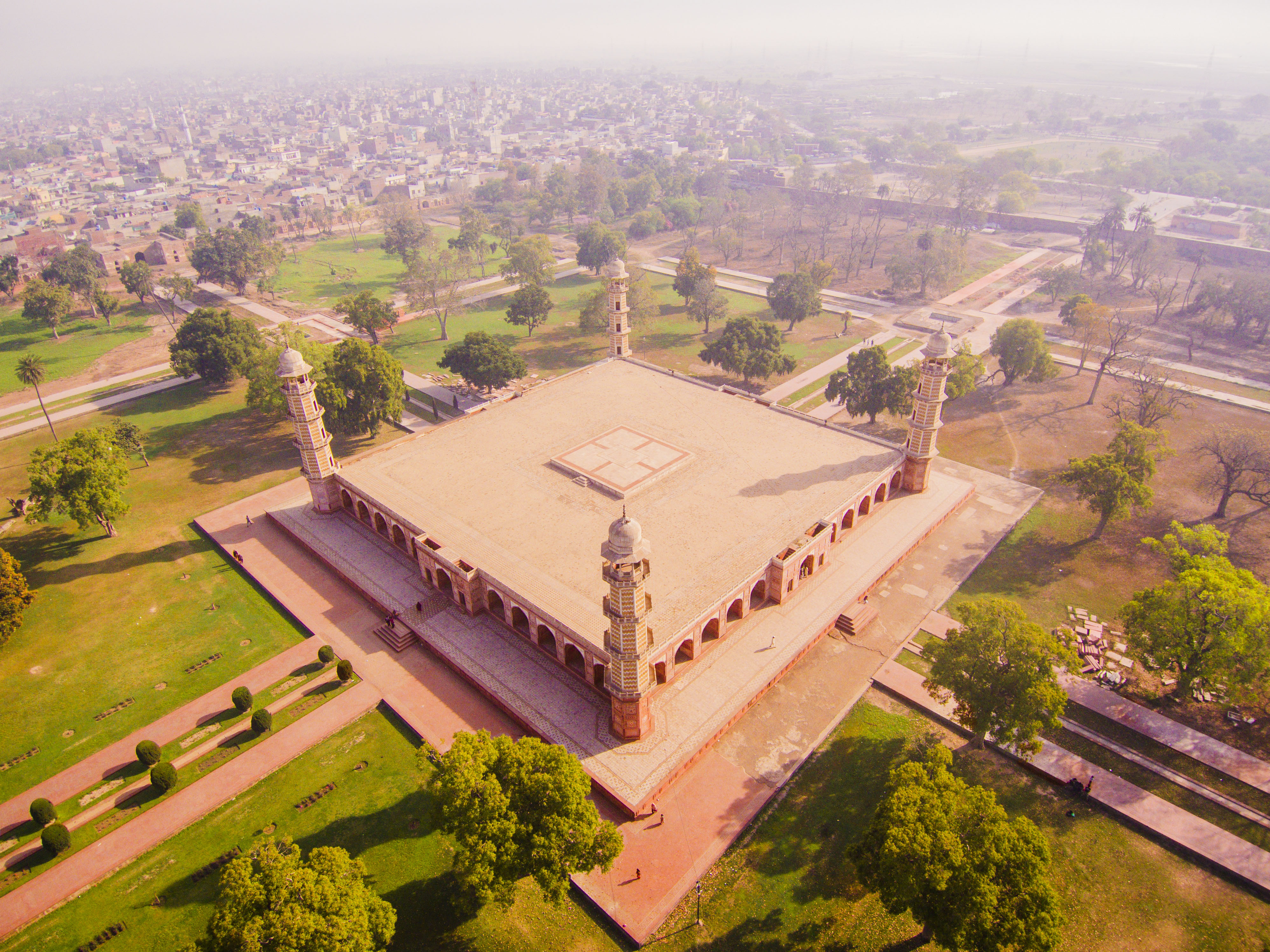
The Tomb of Jahangir was built in 1673.

Shahdara can be translated as "the pathway or passage of kings". Shah translates as 'king' and dara translates as 'the passage'. The precinct was previously known as Bagh-e-Dil Kusha.

In the 15th century, Shahdara was the entrance gate of Lahore during the Mughal Empire. It hosts several historic Mughal architectural sites. These include the Akbari Sarai, the Tomb of Jahangir and that of his brother-in-law Asif Khan. Shahdara Bagh is also home to Kamran's Baradari (Kamran Ki Baradari). Although this site was originally built on the Ravi River bank, the change of the river course turned it into an island in the riverbed.

The small garden houses the tomb of Mughal princess Dohita Un Nissa Begum (1651–1697).

== Transportation ==
Shahdara Bagh railway station serves Shahdara and surrounding areas. Shahdara Metrobus Terminal Station is located on the north bank of river Ravi.

== Gallery ==
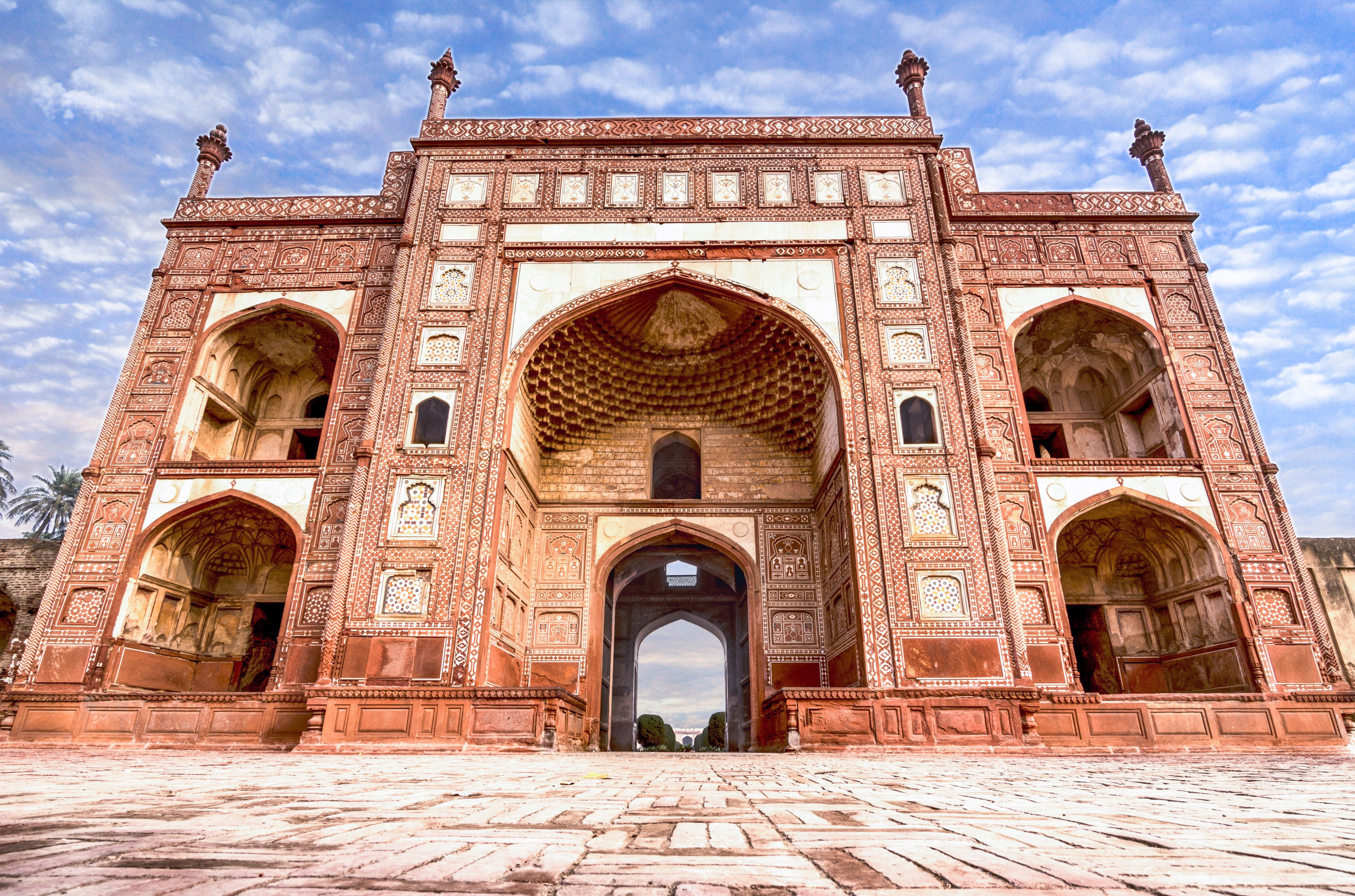
Akbari Sarai

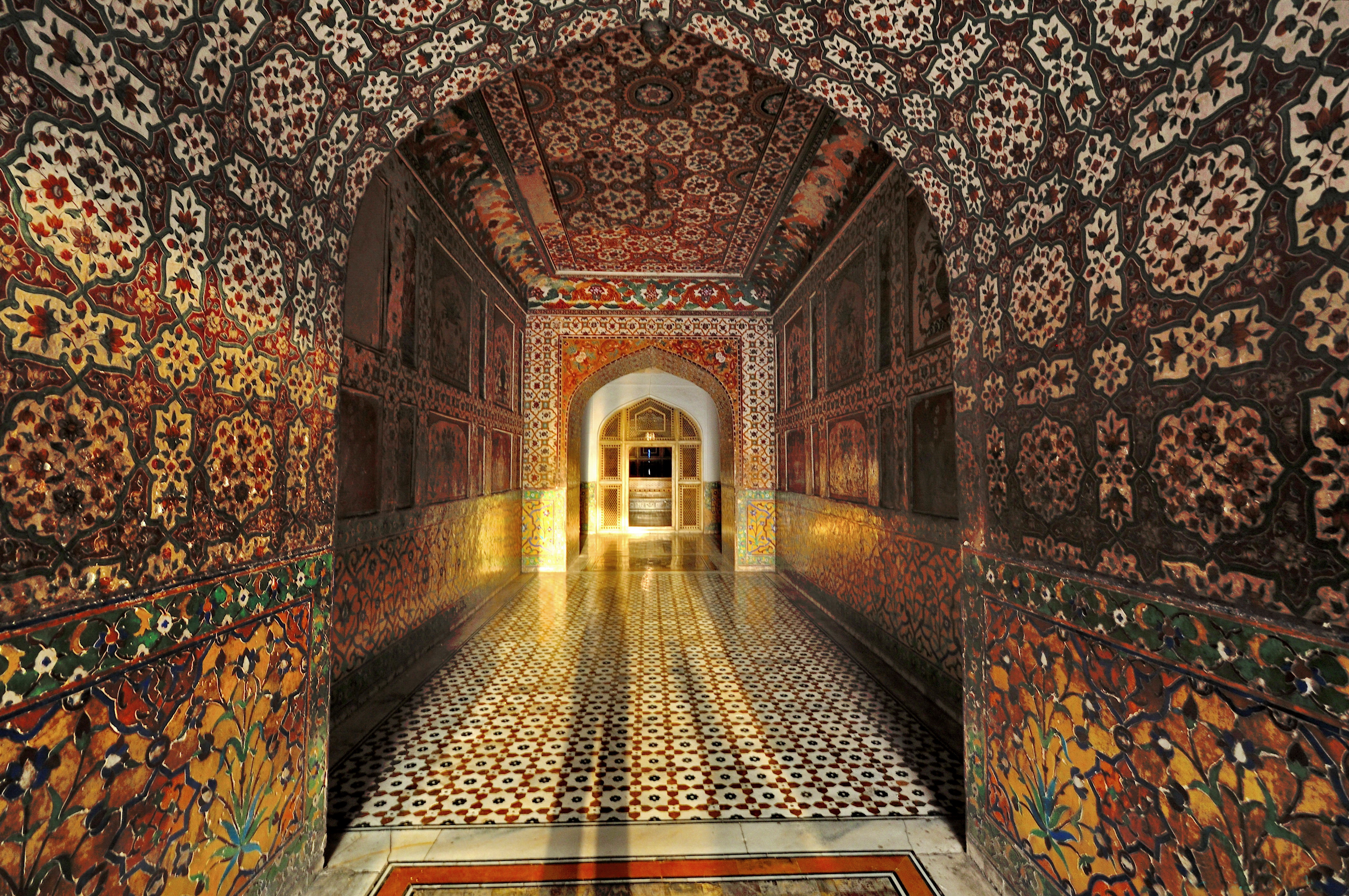
Interior of the Tomb of Jahangir

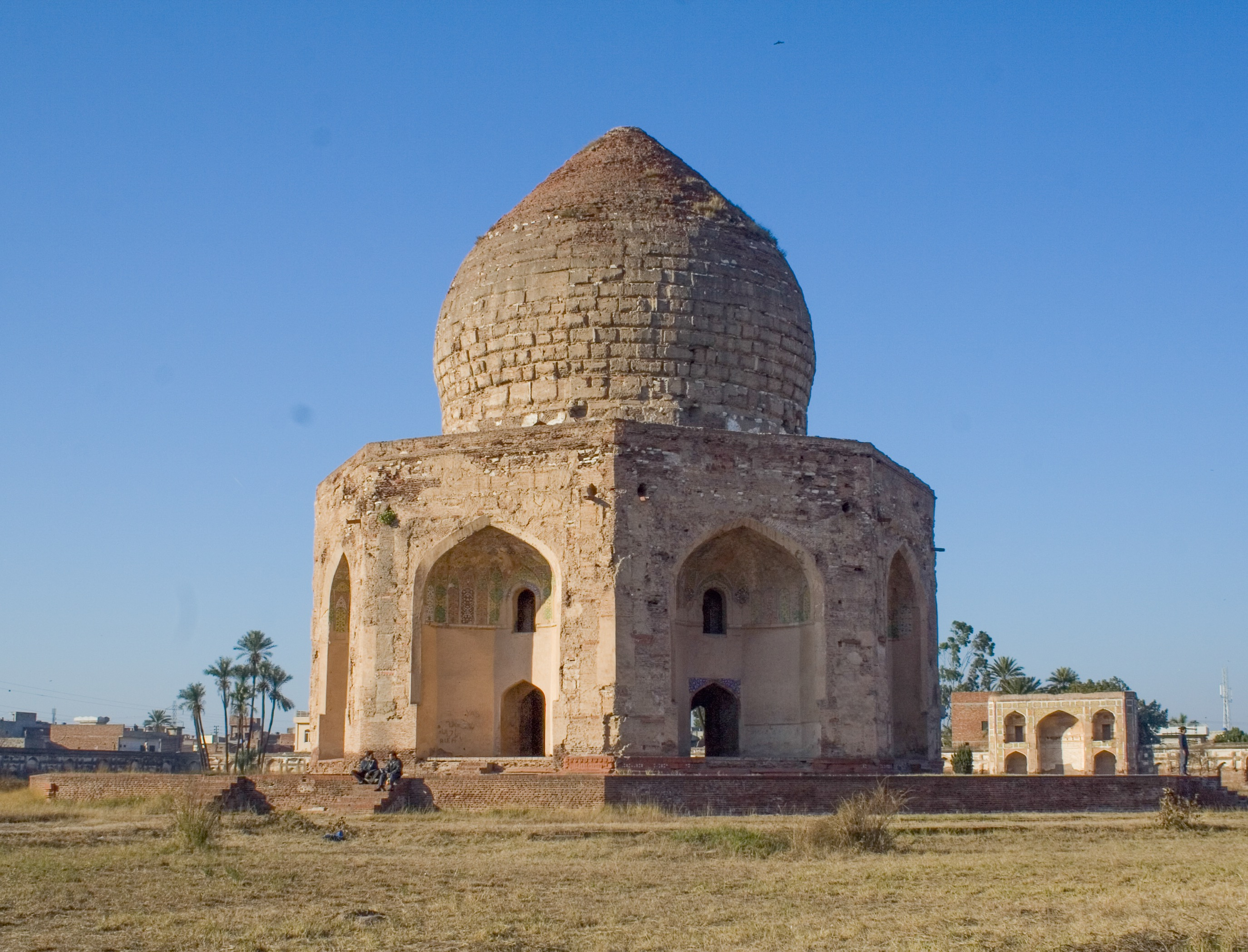
Tomb of Asif Khan

== See also ==
- List of parks and gardens in Lahore
- List of parks and gardens in Pakistan
- List of parks and gardens in Karachi
- Tomb of Asif Khan
- Tomb of Jahangir
- Tomb of Muhammad Iqbal
- Tomb of Nur Jahan
