= Baradari of Kamran Mirza =

Monument in Lahore, Pakistan

- کامران کی بارہ دری
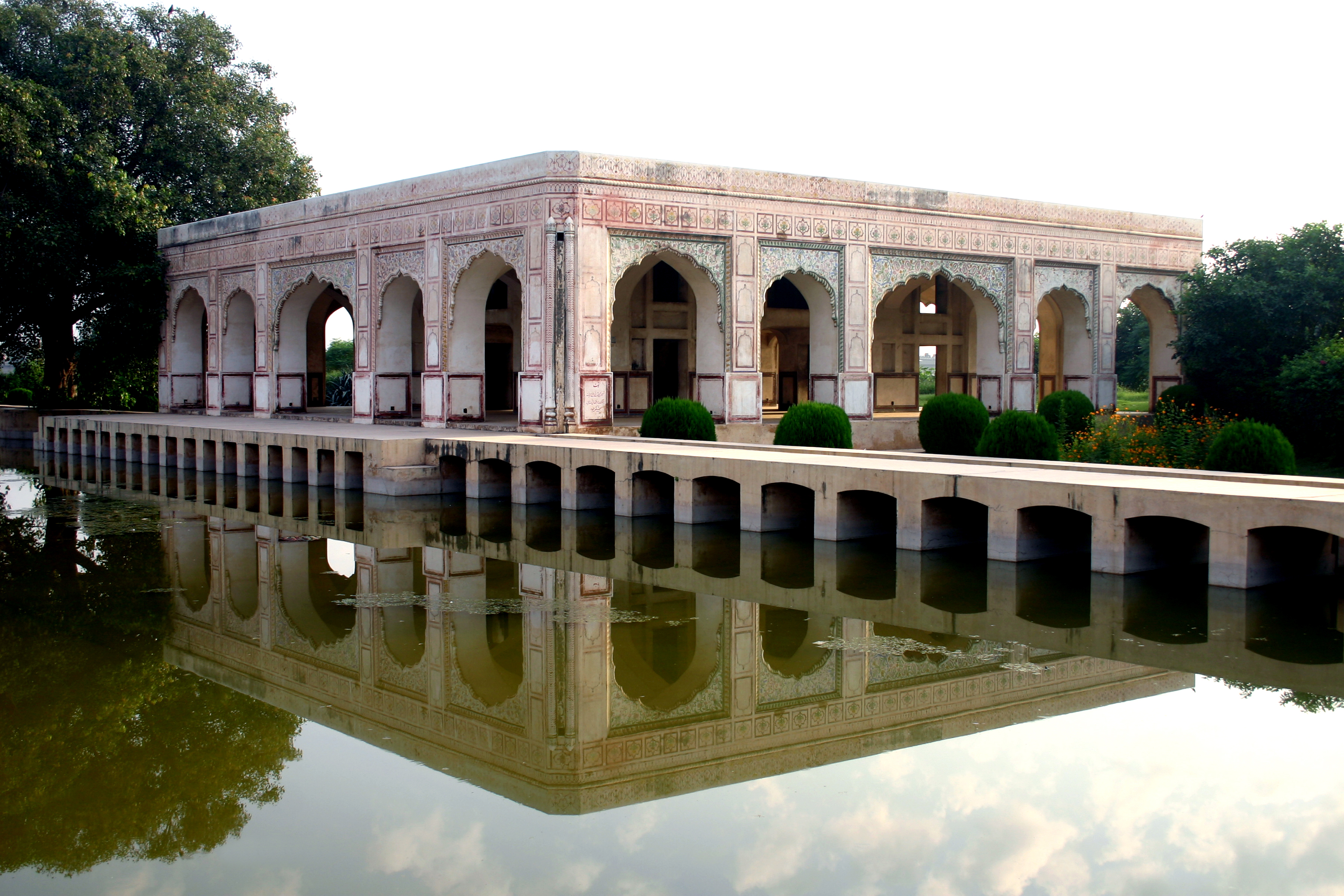
- Interactive map of Baradari of Kamran Mirza
- Location: Lahore, Punjab, Pakistan
- Coordinates: 31.6067°N 74.2937°E
- Type: Baradari/summer pavilion
- Completion date: 1540 C.E.

Baradari of Kamran Mirza (Urdu: کامران کی بارہ دری; Kāmrān kī bārɘdɘrī) is a summer pavilion (baradari) in Lahore, Pakistan. It was built in 1540 by Kamran Mirza, a son of first Mughal emperor Babur, and a brother of the second Mughal emperor Humayun. The building is believed to be the oldest existing Mughal structure in Lahore, and is the only garden in Lahore's Shahdara Bagh area that was not converted into a funerary monument.

== History ==
After Babur's death in 1530, Kamran Mirza seized Lahore and laid a garden in which the baradari was built in 1540. At the time of construction, the baradari was on the western bank of the River Ravi in the Shahdara Bagh region, though it now stands on an island in the middle of the river, due to shifts in the river's course. The pavilion remained in use by Mughal royals until the 18th century.

After the British annexed Punjab in 1849, the pavilion was turned into a tollhouse for boats crossing the river. It was also mentioned as Turgurhwallee Baradari in an 1867 map of Lahore, where it was shown located on the western bank of the river.

Part of baradari's eastern façade had been damaged by floods by the 1850s, while the baradari's second story had also been damaged or dismantled around the same time. The pavilion sustained further damage by flooding in 1958. It was reconstructed in 1989 at a cost of 19.6 million rupees (about $1 million).

The intricate frescoes and designs on the pavilion walls are currently being restored to their original condition by the Directorate General of Archaeology, Punjab.

=== Age ===
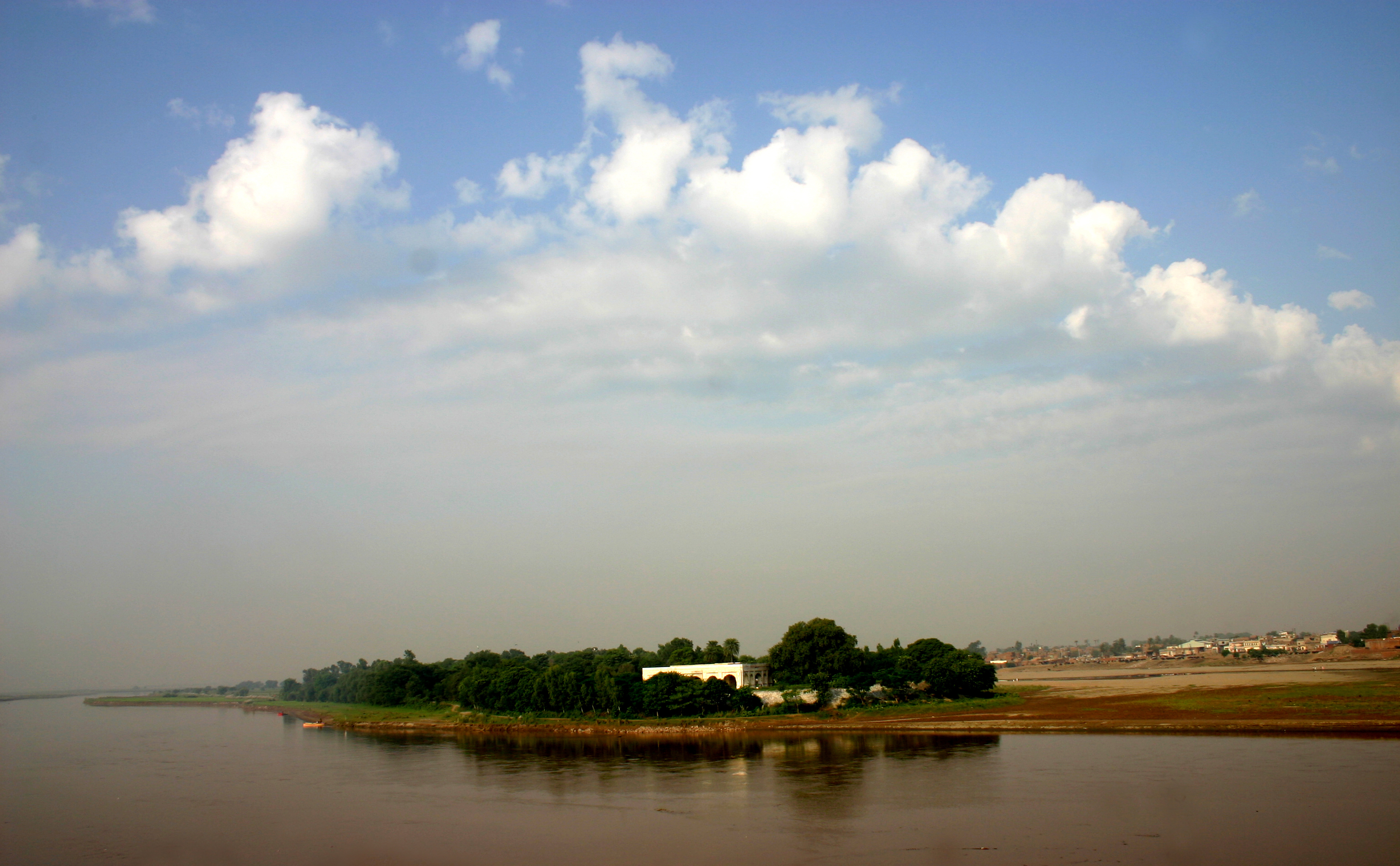
The pavilion is now on an island in the middle of the River Ravi.

Some characteristics of the pavilion suggest the current baradari may not be original to Kamran Mirza's garden. Though it is believed that Kamran Mirza had indeed laid his garden where it currently stands, the first mention of the pavilion specifically belonging to Kamran Mirza dates from 1860, and may have been based on local oral traditions that later historians repeated as fact.

The pavilion has cusped arches, which were commonly used during the reign of Mughal emperor Shah Jahan in the 17th century and onwards, suggesting that the current structure attributed to Kamran Mirza may have been heavily restored, a reconstruction, or originally built in later centuries. Research done in 1988 found that the garden was built using the unit of measurement called Gaz-i-Illahi which was commonly used in Akbar's reign, rather than the Gaz unit of measurement used during the life of Kamran Mirza.

== Architecture ==
Like all baradaris, the structure has twelve doors. The pavilion was originally two levels with 12 columns of vaulted balconies.
